= History of general anesthesia =

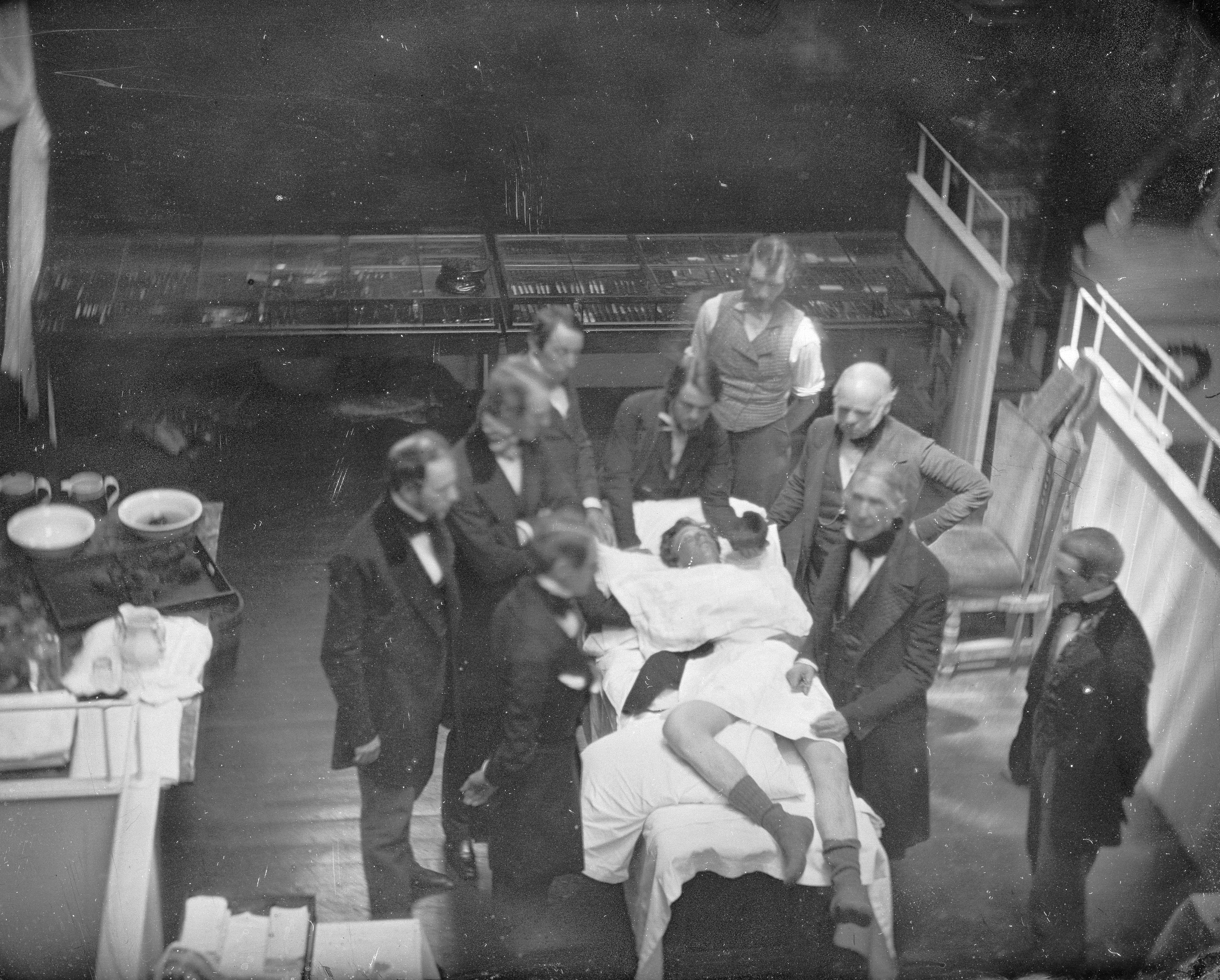
Historic image of an early ether operation conducted at Massachusetts General Hospital, Boston. The daguerreotype was taken by Southworth & Hawes on July 3, 1847. Drs. John Collins Warren, Jonathan Mason Warren, and Henry Jacob Bigelow are among the surgeons depicted in the photo.

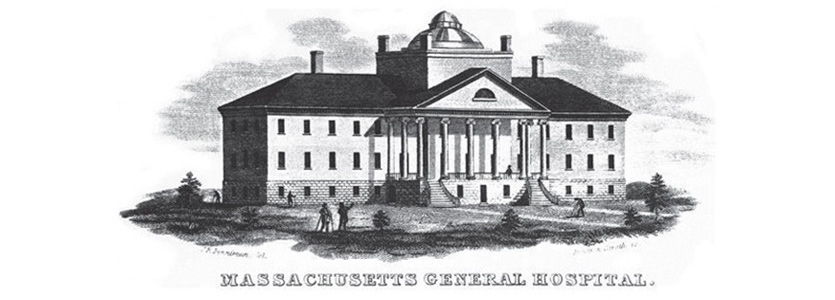
The Bulfinch Building, home of the Ether Dome

Throughout recorded history, attempts at producing a state of general anesthesia can be traced back to the writings of ancient Sumerians, Babylonians, Assyrians, Akkadians, Egyptians, Persians, Indians, and Chinese.

Despite significant advances in anatomy and surgical techniques during the Renaissance, surgery remained a last-resort treatment largely due to the pain associated with it. This limited surgical procedures to addressing only life-threatening conditions, with techniques focused on speed to limit blood loss. All of these interventions carried high risk of complications, especially death. Around 80% of surgeries led to severe infections, and 50% of patients died either during surgery or from complications thereafter. Many of the patients who were fortunate enough to survive remained psychologically traumatized for the rest of their lives. However, scientific discoveries in the late 18th and early 19th centuries paved the way for the development of modern anesthetic techniques.

The 19th century was filled with scientific advancements in pharmacology and physiology. During the 1840s, the introduction of diethyl ether (1842), nitrous oxide (1844), and chloroform (1847) as general anesthetics revolutionized modern medicine. The late 19th century also saw major advancements to modern surgery with the development and application of antiseptic techniques as a result of the germ theory of disease, which significantly reduced morbidity and mortality rates.

In the 20th century, the safety and efficacy of general anesthetics were further improved with the routine use of tracheal intubation and advanced airway management techniques, monitoring, and new anesthetic agents with improved characteristics. Standardized training programs for anesthesiologists and nurse anesthetists emerged during this period.

Moreover, the application of economic and business administration principles to healthcare in the late 20th and early 21st centuries led to the introduction of management practices, such as transfer pricing, to improve the efficiency of anesthetists.

== Etymology of anesthesia ==
In ancient Greek texts, such as the Hippocratic Corpus and the dialogue Timaeus, the term ἀναισθησία (anaisthēsíā) is used, which translates to "without sensation". This term is derived from the prefix ἀν- (an-), meaning "without", and αἴσθησις (aisthēsis), which means "sensation". The concept of anaisthēsia is significant in understanding the historical foundations of anesthesia and its relevance in medical practices. In 1679, Steven Blankaart published Lexicon medicum graeco-latinum with the Latin term anaisthesia. In 1684, an English translation appeared titled A Physical Dictionary, with anesthesia defined as a "defect of sensation, as in paralytic and blasted persons". Subsequently, the term and variant spellings like anæsthesia are used in medical literature signifying "insensibility".

In 1846, in a letter, Oliver Wendell Holmes proposed the term anesthesia to be used for the state induced by an agent and anesthetic for the agent itself. Holmes motivates this with earlier uses of anesthesia in medical literature to mean "insensibility", particularly to "objects of touch".

== Antiquity ==
The first attempts at general anesthesia were probably herbal remedies administered in prehistory. Alcohol is the oldest known sedative; it was used in ancient Mesopotamia thousands of years ago.

=== Ethanol ===
The first historical achievement in anesthesia occurred around 4000 BC in ancient Mesopotamia. This was the advent of ethanol (commonly known as drinking alcohol), the first general anaesthetic agent. These accounts of the anesthetic uses of ethanol come from the oldest known historical civilization of Sumer and are documented in the oldest known writing system cuneiform.

=== Opium ===
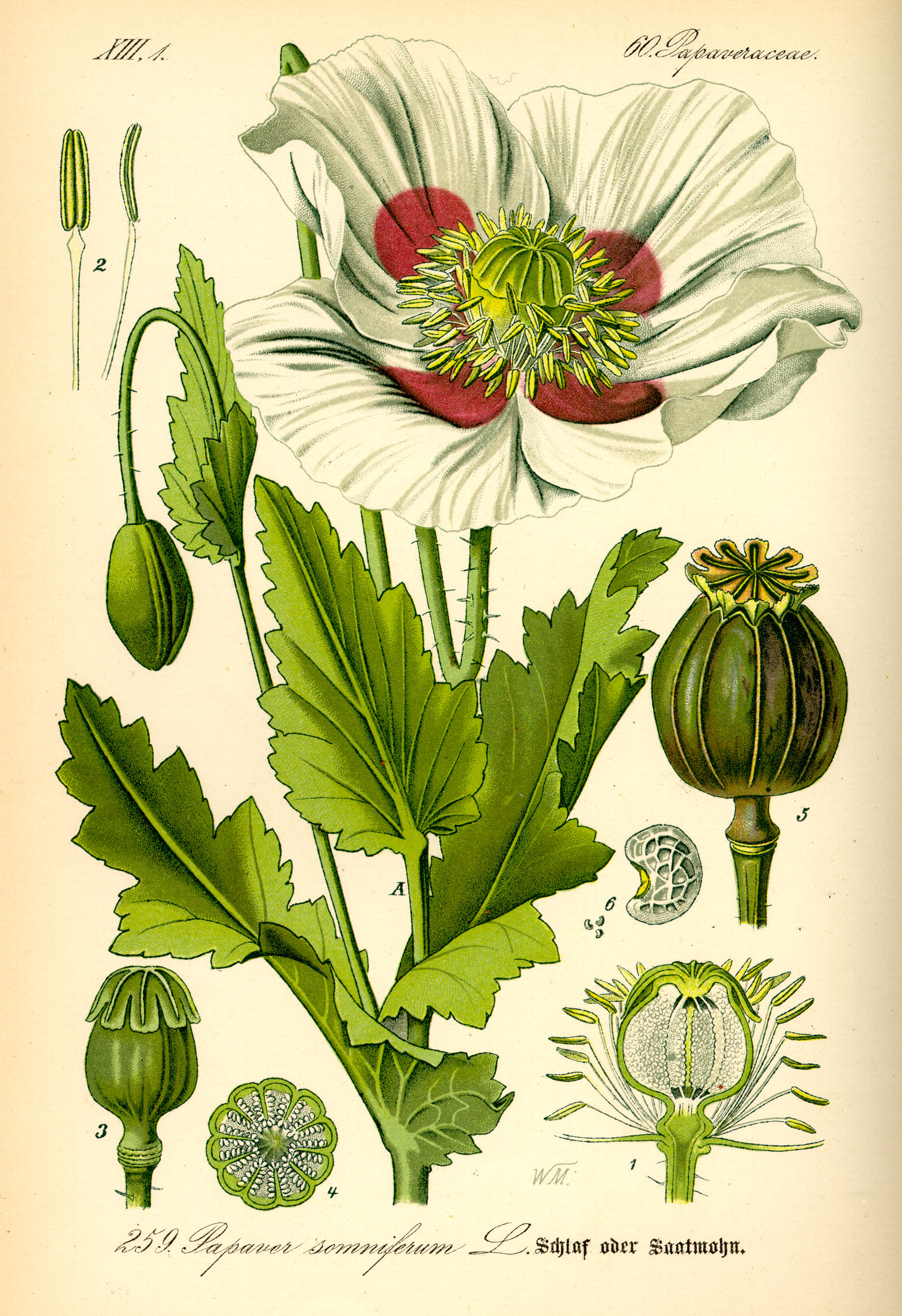
Opium poppy, Papaver somniferum

The Sumerians are said to have cultivated and harvested the opium poppy (Papaver somniferum) in lower Mesopotamia as early as 3400 BC, though this has been disputed. The most ancient testimony concerning the opium poppy found to date was inscribed in cuneiform script on a small white clay tablet at the end of the third millennium BC. This tablet was discovered in 1954 during excavations at Nippur, and is currently kept at the University of Pennsylvania Museum of Archaeology and Anthropology. Deciphered by Samuel Noah Kramer and Martin Leve, it is considered to be the most ancient pharmacopoeia in existence. Some Sumerian tablets of this era have an ideogram inscribed upon them, "hul gil", which translates to "plant of joy", believed by some authors to refer to opium. The term gil is still used for opium in certain parts of the world. The Sumerian goddess Nidaba is often depicted with poppies growing out of her shoulders. About 2225 BC, the Sumerian territory became a part of the Babylonian empire. Knowledge and use of the opium poppy and its euphoric effects thus passed to the Babylonians, who expanded their empire eastwards to Persia and westwards to Egypt, thereby extending its range to these civilizations. British archaeologist and cuneiformist Reginald Campbell Thompson writes that opium was known to the Assyrians in the 7th century BC. The term "Arat Pa Pa" occurs in the Assyrian Herbal, a collection of inscribed Assyrian tablets dated to c. 650 BC. According to Thompson, this term is the Assyrian name for the juice of the poppy and it may be the etymological origin of the Latin "papaver".

The ancient Egyptians had some surgical instruments, as well as crude analgesics and sedatives, including possibly an extract prepared from the mandrake fruit. The use of preparations similar to opium in surgery is recorded in the Ebers Papyrus, an Egyptian medical papyrus written in the Eighteenth Dynasty. However, it is questionable whether opium itself was known in ancient Egypt. The Greek gods Hypnos (Sleep), Nyx (Night), and Thanatos (Death) were often depicted holding poppies.

Prior to the introduction of opium to ancient India and China, these civilizations pioneered the use of cannabis incense and aconitum. c. 400 BC, the Sushruta Samhita (a text from the Indian subcontinent on Ayurvedic medicine and surgery) advocates the use of wine with incense of cannabis for anesthesia. By the 8th century AD, Arab traders had brought opium to India and China.

=== Classical antiquity ===
In Classical antiquity, anaesthetics were described by:

- Pedanius Dioscorides (De Materia Medica), a Greek physician living in Rome during the first century A.D., who is recorded as the first person to make explicit reference to the administration of mandrake-induced anesthesia to facilitate a surgical intervention.
- Galen
- Hippocrates
- Theophrastus (Historia Plantarum)

=== China and Hua Tuo's ancient chemical mixture ===
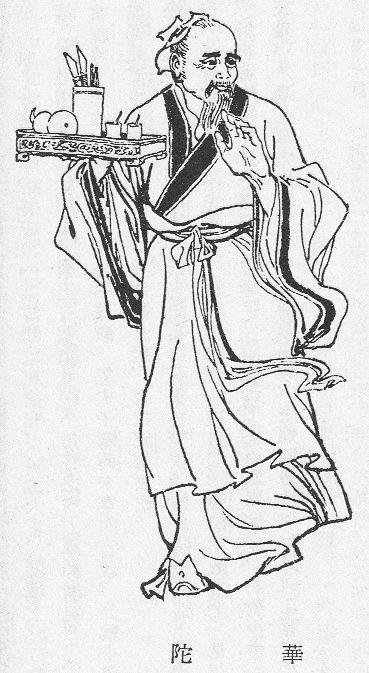
Hua Tuo, Chinese surgeon, c. AD 200

Bian Que (Chinese: 扁鵲, Wade–Giles: Pien Ch'iao, c. 300 BC) was a legendary Chinese internist and surgeon who reportedly used general anesthesia for surgical procedures. It is recorded in the Book of Master Han Fei (c. 250 BC), the Records of the Grand Historian (c. 100 BC), and the Book of Master Lie (c. 300 AD) that Bian Que gave two men, named "Lu" and "Chao", a toxic drink which rendered them unconscious for three days, during which time he performed a gastrostomy upon them.

Hua Tuo (Chinese:華佗， c. 140–208 AD) was a Chinese surgeon of the 2nd century AD. According to the Records of Three Kingdoms (c. 270 AD) and the Book of the Later Han (c. 430 AD), Hua Tuo performed surgery under general anesthesia using a formula he had developed by mixing wine with a mixture of herbal extracts he called mafeisan (麻沸散). Hua Tuo reportedly used mafeisan to perform even major operations such as resection of gangrenous intestines. Before the surgery, he administered an oral anesthetic potion, probably dissolved in wine, in order to induce a state of unconsciousness and partial neuromuscular blockade.

The exact composition of mafeisan, similar to all of Hua Tuo's clinical knowledge, was lost when he burned his manuscripts, just before his death. The composition of the anesthetic powder was not mentioned in either the Records of Three Kingdoms or the Book of the Later Han. Because Confucian teachings regarded the body as sacred and surgery was considered a form of body mutilation, surgery was strongly discouraged in ancient China. Because of this, despite Hua Tuo's reported success with general anesthesia, the practice of surgery in ancient China ended with his death.

The name mafeisan combines ma (麻, meaning "cannabis, hemp, numbed or tingling"), fei (沸, meaning "boiling or bubbling"), and san (散, meaning "to break up or scatter", or "medicine in powder form"). Therefore, the word mafeisan probably means something like "cannabis boil powder". Many sinologists and scholars of traditional Chinese medicine have guessed at the composition of Hua Tuo's mafeisan powder, but the exact components still remain unclear. His formula is believed to have contained some combination of:

- bai zhi (Chinese:白芷，Angelica dahurica),
- cao wu (Chinese:草烏, Aconitum kusnezoffii, Aconitum kusnezoffii, Kusnezoff's monkshood, or wolfsbane root),
- chuān xiōng (Chinese:川芎，Ligusticum wallichii, or Szechuan lovage),
- dong quai (Chinese:当归, Angelica sinensis, or "female ginseng"),
- wu tou (烏頭, Aconitum carmichaelii, rhizome of Aconitum, or "Chinese monkshood"),
- yang jin hua (洋金花, Flos Daturae metelis, or Datura stramonium, jimson weed, devil's trumpet, thorn apple, locoweed, moonflower),
- ya pu lu (押不芦, Mandragora officinarum),
- rhododendron flower, and
- jasmine root.

Others have suggested the potion may have also contained hashish, bhang, shang-luh, or opium. Victor H. Mair wrote that mafei "appears to be a transcription of some Indo-European word related to "morphine"." Some authors believe that Hua Tuo may have discovered surgical analgesia by acupuncture, and that mafeisan either had nothing to do with or was simply an adjunct to his strategy for anesthesia. Many physicians have attempted to re-create the same formulation based on historical records but none have achieved the same clinical efficacy as Hua Tuo's. In any event, Hua Tuo's formula did not appear to be effective for major operations.

Other substances used from antiquity for anesthetic purposes include extracts of juniper and coca.

== Middle Ages and Renaissance ==
Ferdowsi (940–1020) was a Persian poet who lived in the Abbasid Caliphate. In Shahnameh, his national epic poem, Ferdowsi described a caesarean section performed on Rudaba. A special wine prepared by a Zoroastrian priest was used as an anesthetic for this operation.

Circa 1020, Ibn Sīnā (980–1037) in The Canon of Medicine described the "soporific sponge", a sponge imbued with aromatics and narcotics, which was to be placed under a patient's nose during surgical operations. Opium made its way from Asia Minor to all parts of Europe between the 10th and 13th centuries.

Throughout 1200 to 1500 AD in England, a potion called dwale was used as an anesthetic. This alcohol-based mixture contained bile, opium, lettuce, bryony, henbane, hemlock, and vinegar. Surgeons roused their patients by rubbing vinegar and salt on their cheekbones. One can find records of dwale in numerous literary sources, including Shakespeare's Hamlet, and the John Keats poem "Ode to a Nightingale". In the 13th century, we have the first prescription of the "spongia soporifica"—a sponge soaked in the juices of unripe mulberry, flax, mandragora leaves, ivy, lettuce seeds, lapathum, and hemlock with hyoscyamus. After treatment and/or storage, the sponge could be heated and the vapors inhaled with anesthetic effect.

Alchemist Ramon Llull has been credited with discovering diethyl ether in 1275. Philippus Aureolus Theophrastus Bombastus von Hohenheim (1493–1541), better known as Paracelsus, discovered the analgesic properties of diethyl ether around 1525. It was first synthesized in 1540 by Valerius Cordus, who noted some of its medicinal properties. He called it oleum dulce vitrioli, a name that reflects the fact that it is synthesized by distilling a mixture of ethanol and sulfuric acid (known at that time as oil of vitriol). August Sigmund Frobenius gave the name Spiritus Vini Æthereus to the substance in 1730.

== 18th century ==
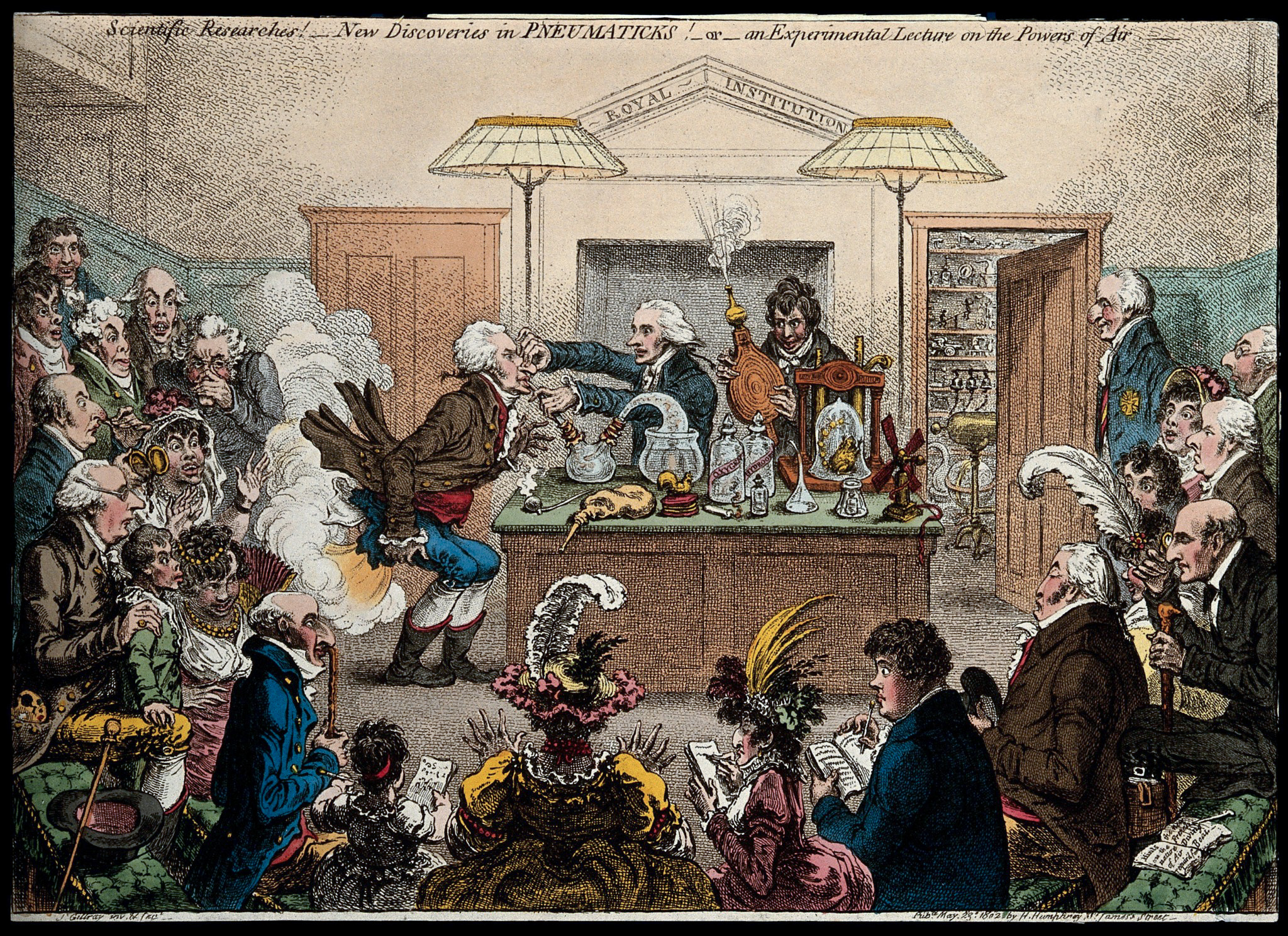
Satirical cartoon by James Gillray showing a Royal Institution lecture, with Humphry Davy holding the bellows and Count Rumford looking on at extreme right

Joseph Priestley (1733–1804) was an English polymath who discovered nitrous oxide, nitric oxide, ammonia, hydrogen chloride, and (along with Carl Wilhelm Scheele and Antoine Lavoisier) oxygen. Beginning in 1775, Priestley published his research in Experiments and Observations on Different Kinds of Air, a six-volume work. The recent discoveries about these and other gases stimulated a great deal of interest in the European scientific community. Thomas Beddoes (1760–1808) was an English philosopher, physician and teacher of medicine, and like his older colleague Priestley, was also a member of the Lunar Society of Birmingham. With an eye toward making further advances in this new science as well as offering treatment for diseases previously thought to be untreatable (such as asthma and tuberculosis), Beddoes founded the Pneumatic Institution for inhalation gas therapy in 1798 at Dowry Square in Clifton, Bristol. Beddoes employed chemist and physicist Humphry Davy (1778–1829) as superintendent of the institute, and engineer James Watt (1736–1819) to help manufacture the gases. Other members of the Lunar Society such as Erasmus Darwin and Josiah Wedgwood were also actively involved with the institute.

During the course of his research at the Pneumatic Institution, Davy discovered the anesthetic properties of nitrous oxide. Davy, who coined the term "laughing gas" for nitrous oxide, published his findings the following year in the now-classic treatise, Researches, chemical and philosophical–chiefly concerning nitrous oxide or dephlogisticated nitrous air, and its respiration. Davy was not a physician, and he never administered nitrous oxide during a surgical procedure. He was, however, the first to document the analgesic effects of nitrous oxide, as well as its potential benefits in relieving pain during surgery:

As nitrous oxide in its extensive operation appears capable of destroying physical pain, it may probably be used with advantage during surgical operations in which no great effusion of blood takes place.

== 19th century ==
=== Eastern world ===
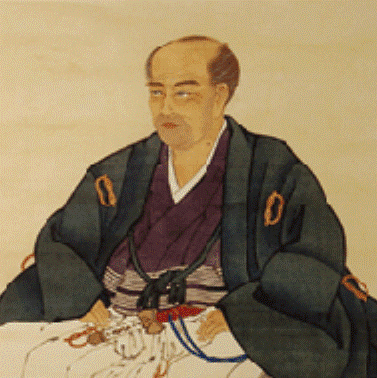
Hanaoka Seishū, a Japanese surgeon of the 18th and 19th centuries

Takamine Tokumei from Shuri, Ryūkyū Kingdom, is reported to have made a general anesthesia in 1689 in the Ryukyus, now known as Okinawa. He passed on his knowledge to the Satsuma doctors in 1690 and to Ryūkyūan doctors in 1714.

Hanaoka Seishū (華岡 青洲, 1760–1835) of Osaka was a Japanese surgeon of the Edo period with a knowledge of Chinese herbal medicine, as well as Western surgical techniques he had learned through Rangaku (literally "Dutch learning", and by extension "Western learning"). Beginning in about 1785, Hanaoka embarked on a quest to re-create a compound that would have pharmacologic properties similar to Hua Tuo's mafeisan. After years of research and experimentation, he finally developed a formula which he named tsūsensan (also known as mafutsu-san). Like that of Hua Tuo, this compound was composed of extracts of several different plants, including:

- 2 parts bai zhi (Chinese:白芷，Angelica dahurica);
- 2 parts cao wu (Chinese:草烏，Aconitum sp., monkshood or wolfsbane);
- 2 parts chuān ban xia (Pinellia ternata);
- 2 parts chuān xiōng (Ligusticum wallichii, Cnidium rhizome, Cnidium officinale or Szechuan lovage);
- 2 parts dong quai (Angelica sinensis or female ginseng);
- 1 part tian nan xing (Arisaema rhizomatum or cobra lily)
- 8 parts yang jin hua (Datura stramonium, Korean morning glory, thorn apple, jimson weed, devil's trumpet, stinkweed, or locoweed).

The active ingredients in tsūsensan are scopolamine, hyoscyamine, atropine, aconitine and angelicotoxin. When consumed in sufficient quantity, tsūsensan produces a state of general anesthesia and skeletal muscle paralysis. Shutei Nakagawa (1773–1850), a close friend of Hanaoka, wrote a small pamphlet titled "Mayaku-ko" ("narcotic powder") in 1796. Although the original manuscript was lost in a fire in 1867, this brochure described the current state of Hanaoka's research on general anesthesia.

On 13 October 1804, Hanaoka performed a partial mastectomy for breast cancer on a 60-year-old woman named Kan Aiya, using tsūsensan as a general anaesthetic. This is generally regarded today as the first reliable documentation of an operation to be performed under general anesthesia. Hanaoka went on to perform many operations using tsūsensan, including resection of malignant tumors, extraction of bladder stones, and extremity amputations. Before his death in 1835, Hanaoka performed more than 150 operations for breast cancer.

=== Western world ===
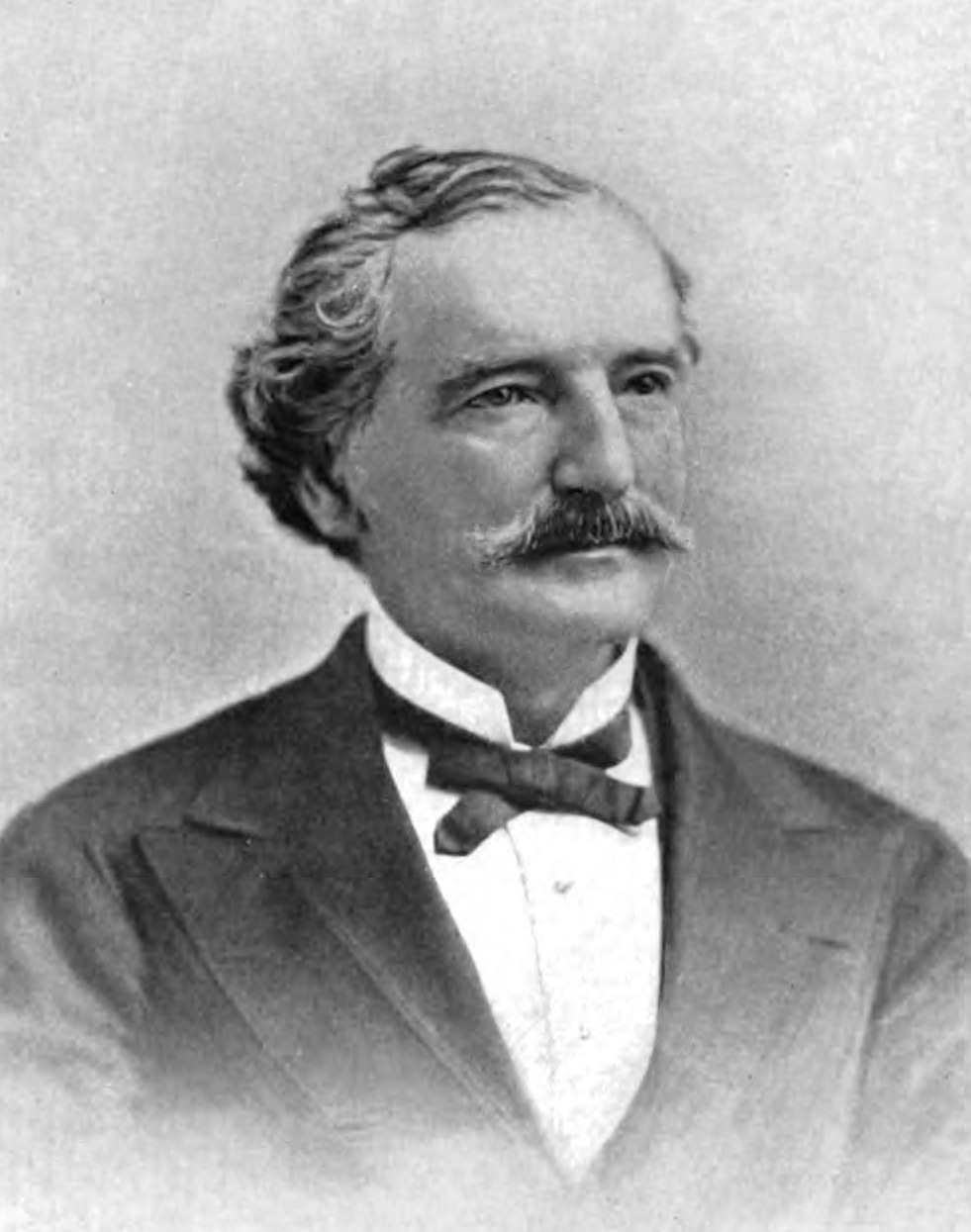
Gardner Quincy Colton, 19th-century American dentist

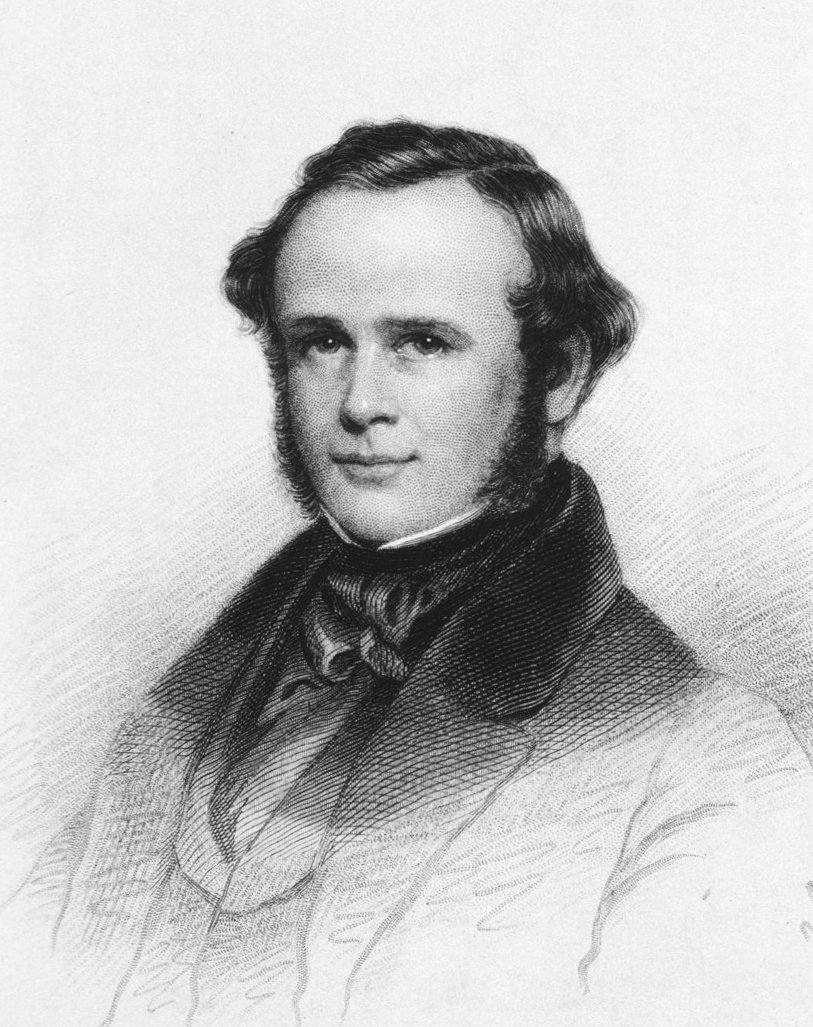
Horace Wells, 19th-century American dentist

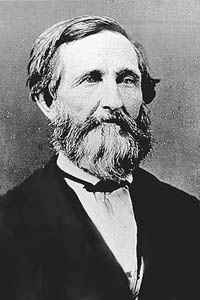
Crawford W. Long, 19th-century American physician

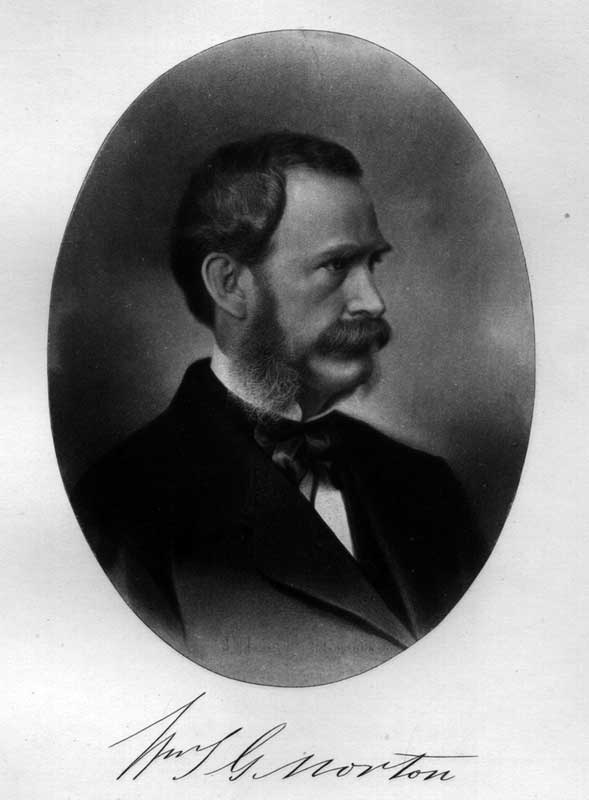
William T. G. Morton, 19th-century American dentist

Friedrich Sertürner (1783–1841) first isolated morphine from opium in 1804; he named it morphine after Morpheus, the Greek god of dreams.

Henry Hill Hickman (1800–1830) experimented with the use of carbon dioxide as an anesthetic in the 1820s. He would make the animal insensible, effectively via almost suffocating it with carbon dioxide, then determine the effects of the gas by amputating one of its limbs. In 1824, Hickman submitted the results of his research to the Royal Society in a short treatise titled Letter on suspended animation: with the view of ascertaining its probable utility in surgical operations on human subjects. The response was an 1826 article in The Lancet titled "Surgical Humbug" that ruthlessly criticised his work. Hickman died four years later at age 30. Though he was unappreciated at the time of his death, his work has since been positively reappraised and he is now recognised as one of the fathers of anesthesia.

By the late 1830s, Humphry Davy's experiments had become widely publicized within academic circles in the northeastern United States. Wandering lecturers would hold public gatherings, referred to as "ether frolics", where members of the audience were encouraged to inhale diethyl ether or nitrous oxide to demonstrate the mind-altering properties of these agents while providing much entertainment to onlookers. Four notable men participated in these events and witnessed the use of ether in this manner. They were William Edward Clarke (1819–1898), Crawford W. Long (1815–1878), Horace Wells (1815–1848), and William T. G. Morton (1819–1868).

While attending undergraduate school in Rochester, New York, in 1839, classmates Clarke and Morton apparently participated in ether frolics with some regularity. In January 1842, by now a medical student at Berkshire Medical College, Clarke administered ether to a Miss Hobbie, while Elijah Pope performed a dental extraction. In so doing, he became the first to administer an inhaled anesthetic to facilitate the performance of a surgical procedure. Clarke apparently thought little of his accomplishment, and chose neither to publish nor to pursue this technique any further. Indeed, this event is not even mentioned in Clarke's biography.

Crawford W. Long was a physician and pharmacist practicing in Jefferson, Georgia in the mid-19th century. During his time as a student at the University of Pennsylvania School of Medicine in the late 1830s, he had observed and probably participated in the ether frolics that had become popular at that time. At these gatherings, Long observed that some participants experienced bumps and bruises, but afterward had no recall of what had happened. He postulated that diethyl ether produced pharmacologic effects similar to those of nitrous oxide. On 30 March 1842, he administered diethyl ether by inhalation to a man named James Venable, in order to remove a tumor from the man's neck. Long later removed a second tumor from Venable, again under ether anesthesia. He went on to employ ether as a general anesthetic for limb amputations and childbirth. Long, however, did not publish his experience until 1849, thereby denying himself much of the credit he deserved.

With the beginnings of modern medicine the stage was set for physicians and surgeons to build a paradigm in which anesthesia became useful.

On 10 December 1844, Gardner Quincy Colton held a public demonstration of nitrous oxide in Hartford, Connecticut. One of the participants, Samuel A. Cooley, sustained a significant injury to his leg while under the influence of nitrous oxide without noticing the injury. Horace Wells, a Connecticut dentist present in the audience that day, immediately seized upon the significance of this apparent analgesic effect of nitrous oxide. The following day, Wells underwent a painless dental extraction while under the influence of nitrous oxide administered by Colton. Wells then began to administer nitrous oxide to his patients, successfully performing several dental extractions over the next couple of weeks.

William T. G. Morton, another New England dentist, was a former student and then-current business partner of Wells. He was also a former acquaintance and classmate of William Edward Clarke (the two had attended undergraduate school together in Rochester, New York). Morton arranged for Wells to demonstrate his technique for dental extraction under nitrous oxide general anesthesia at Massachusetts General Hospital, in conjunction with the prominent surgeon John Collins Warren. This demonstration, which took place on 20 January 1845, ended in failure when the patient cried out in pain in the middle of the operation.

On 30 September 1846, Morton administered diethyl ether to Eben Frost, a music teacher from Boston, for a dental extraction. Two weeks later, Morton became the first to publicly demonstrate the use of diethyl ether as a general anesthetic at Massachusetts General Hospital, in what is known today as the Ether Dome. On 16 October 1846, John Collins Warren removed a tumor from the neck of a local printer, Edward Gilbert Abbott. Upon completion of the procedure, Warren reportedly quipped, "Gentlemen, this is no humbug." News of this event rapidly traveled around the world. Robert Liston performed the first amputation in December of that year. Morton published his experience soon after. Harvard University professor Charles Thomas Jackson (1805–1880) later claimed that Morton stole his idea; Morton disagreed and a lifelong dispute began. For many years, Morton was credited as being the pioneer of general anesthesia in the Western hemisphere, despite the fact that his demonstration occurred four years after Long's initial experience. Long later petitioned William Crosby Dawson (1798–1856), a United States Senator from Georgia at that time, to support his claim on the floor of the United States Senate as the first to use ether anesthesia.

In 1847, Scottish obstetrician James Young Simpson (1811–1870) of Edinburgh was the first to use chloroform as a general anesthetic on a human (Robert Mortimer Glover had written on this possibility in 1842 but only used it on dogs). The use of chloroform anesthesia expanded rapidly thereafter in Europe. Chloroform began to replace ether as an anesthetic in the United States at the beginning of the 20th century. It was soon abandoned in favor of ether when its hepatic and cardiac toxicity, especially its tendency to cause potentially fatal cardiac dysrhythmias, became apparent. In fact, the use of chloroform versus ether as the primary anesthetic gas varied by country and region. For instance, Britain and the American South stuck with chloroform while the American North returned to ether. John Snow quickly became the most experienced British physician working with the new anesthetic gases of ether and chloroform thus becoming, in effect, the first British anesthetist. Through his careful clinical records he was eventually able to convince the elite of London medicine that anesthesia (chloroform) had a rightful place in childbirth. Thus, in 1853 Queen Victoria's accoucheurs invited John Snow to anesthetize the Queen for the birth of her eighth child. From the beginnings of ether and chloroform anesthesia until well into the 20th century, the standard method of administration was the drop mask. A mask was placed over the patient's mouth with some fabric in it and the volatile liquid was dropped onto the mask with the patient spontaneously breathing. Later development of safe endotracheal tubes changed this. Because of the unique social setting of London medicine, anesthesia had become its own speciality there by the end of the nineteenth century, while in the rest of the United Kingdom and most of the world anesthesia remained under the purview of the surgeon who would assign the task to a junior doctor or nurse.

After Austrian diplomat Karl von Scherzer brought back sufficient quantities of coca leaves from Peru, in 1860 Albert Niemann isolated cocaine, which thus became the first local anesthetic.

In 1871, the German surgeon Friedrich Trendelenburg (1844–1924) published a paper describing the first successful elective human tracheotomy to be performed for the purpose of administration of general anesthesia.

In 1880, the Scottish surgeon William Macewen (1848–1924) reported on his use of orotracheal intubation as an alternative to tracheotomy to allow a patient with glottic edema to breathe, as well as in the setting of general anesthesia with chloroform. All previous observations of the glottis and larynx (including those of Manuel García, Wilhelm Hack and Macewen) had been performed under indirect vision (using mirrors) until 23 April 1895, when Alfred Kirstein (1863–1922) of Germany first described direct visualization of the vocal cords. Kirstein performed the first direct laryngoscopy in Berlin, using an esophagoscope he had modified for this purpose; he called this device an autoscope. The death of Emperor Frederick III (1831–1888) may have motivated Kirstein to develop the autoscope.

== 20th century ==
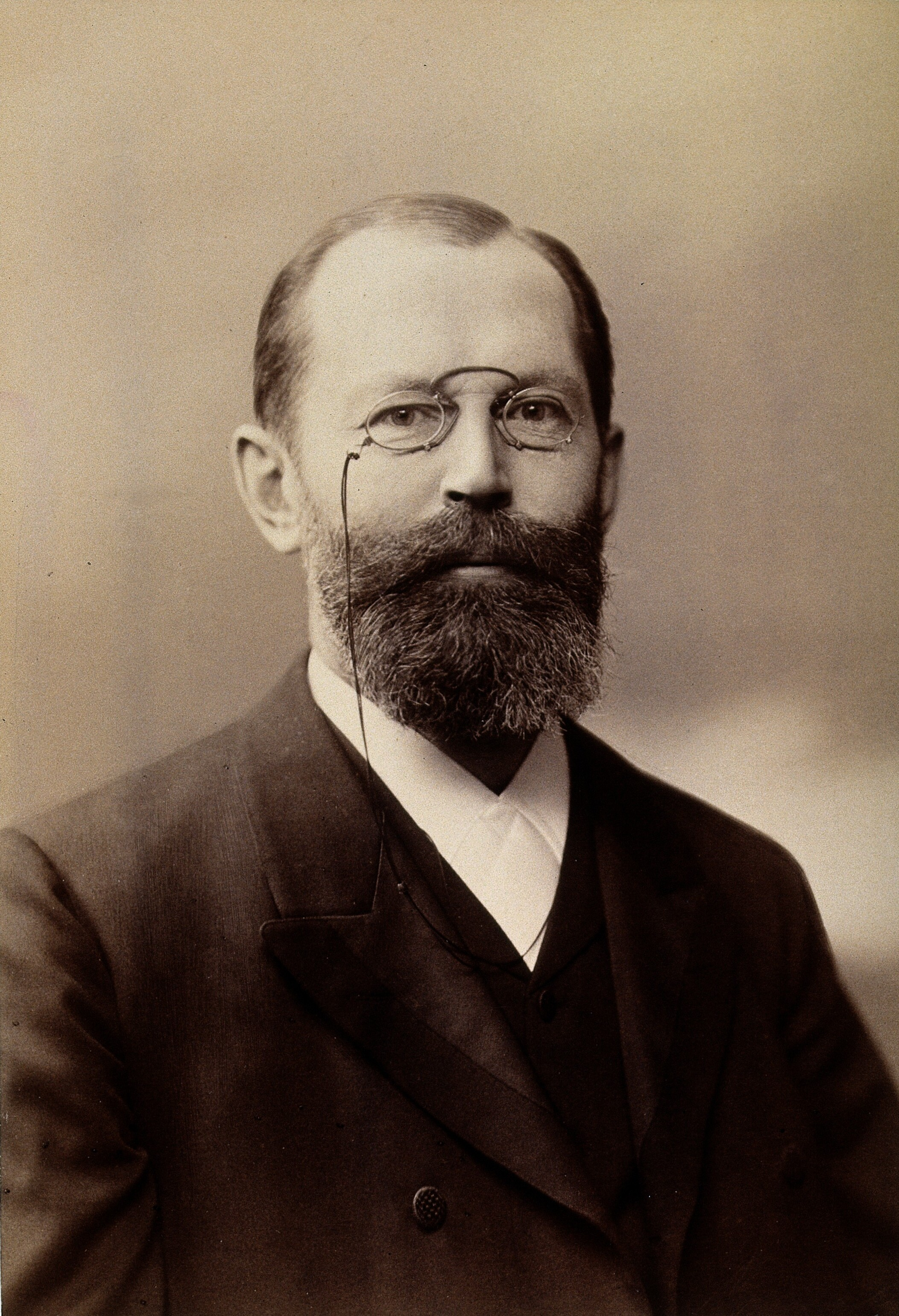
Hermann Emil Fischer, German chemist

The 20th century saw the transformation of the practices of tracheotomy, endoscopy and non-surgical tracheal intubation from rarely employed procedures to essential components of the practices of anesthesia, critical care medicine, emergency medicine, gastroenterology, pulmonology, and surgery.

In 1902, Hermann Emil Fischer (1852–1919) and Joseph von Mering (1849–1908) discovered that diethylbarbituric acid was an effective hypnotic agent. Also called barbital or Veronal (the trade name assigned to it by Bayer Pharmaceuticals), this new drug became the first commercially marketed barbiturate; it was used as a treatment for insomnia from 1903 until the mid-1950s.

Until 1913, oral and maxillofacial surgery was performed by mask inhalation anesthesia, topical application of local anesthetics to the mucosa, rectal anesthesia, or intravenous anesthesia. While otherwise effective, these techniques did not protect the airway from obstruction and also exposed patients to the risk of pulmonary aspiration of blood and mucus into the tracheobronchial tree. In 1913, Chevalier Jackson (1865–1958) was the first to report a high rate of success for the use of direct laryngoscopy as a means to intubate the trachea. Jackson introduced a new laryngoscope blade that had a light source at the distal tip, rather than the proximal light source used by Kirstein. This new blade incorporated a component that the operator could slide out to allow room for passage of an endotracheal tube or bronchoscope.

Also in 1913, Henry H. Janeway (1873–1921) published results he had achieved using a laryngoscope he had recently developed. An American anesthesiologist practicing at Bellevue Hospital in New York City, Janeway was of the opinion that direct intratracheal insufflation of volatile anesthetics would provide improved conditions for otolaryngologic surgery. With this in mind, he developed a laryngoscope designed for the sole purpose of tracheal intubation. Similar to Jackson's device, Janeway's instrument incorporated a distal light source. Unique, however, was the inclusion of batteries within the handle, a central notch in the blade for maintaining the tracheal tube in the midline of the oropharynx during intubation and a slight curve to the distal tip of the blade to help guide the tube through the glottis. The success of this design led to its subsequent use in other types of surgery. Janeway was thus instrumental in popularizing the widespread use of direct laryngoscopy and tracheal intubation in the practice of anesthesiology.

In 1928 Arthur Ernest Guedel introduced the cuffed endotracheal tube, which allowed deep enough anesthesia that completely suppressed spontaneously respirations while the gas and oxygen were delivered via positive pressure ventilation controlled by the anesthesiologist. Also important for the development of modern anesthesia are anesthesia machines. Only three years later Joseph W. Gale developed the technology where the anesthesiologist was able to ventilate only one lung at a time. This allowed the development of thoracic surgery, which had previously been vexed by the pendelluft problem in which the bad lung being operated on inflated with patient exhalation due to the loss of vacuum with the thorax being open to the atmosphere. Eventually by early 1980s double lumen endotracheal tubes made out of clear plastic enabled anesthesiologists to selectively ventilate one lung while using flexible fiberoptic bronchoscopy to block off the diseased lung and prevent cross contamination. One early device, the copper kettle, was developed by Dr. Lucien E. Morris at the University of Wisconsin.

Sodium thiopental, the first intravenous anesthetic, was synthesized in 1934 by Ernest H. Volwiler (1893–1992) and Donalee L. Tabern (1900–1974), working for Abbott Laboratories. It was first used in humans on 8 March 1934 by Ralph M. Waters in an investigation of its properties, which were short-term anesthesia and surprisingly little analgesia. Three months later, John Silas Lundy started a clinical trial of thiopental at the Mayo Clinic at the request of Abbott Laboratories. Volwiler and Tabern were awarded U.S. Patent No. 2,153,729 in 1939 for the discovery of thiopental, and they were inducted into the National Inventors Hall of Fame in 1986.

In 1939, the search for a synthetic substitute for atropine culminated serendipitously in the discovery of meperidine, the first opiate with a structure altogether different from that of morphine. This was followed in 1947 by the widespread introduction of methadone, another structurally unrelated compound with pharmacological properties similar to those of morphine.

After World War I, further advances were made in the field of intratracheal anesthesia. Among these were those made by Sir Ivan Whiteside Magill (1888–1986). Working at the Queen's Hospital for Facial and Jaw Injuries in Sidcup with plastic surgeon Sir Harold Gillies (1882–1960) and anesthetist E. Stanley Rowbotham (1890–1979), Magill developed the technique of awake blind nasotracheal intubation. Magill devised a new type of angulated forceps (the Magill forceps) that are still used today to facilitate nasotracheal intubation in a manner that is little changed from Magill's original technique. Other devices invented by Magill include the Magill laryngoscope blade, as well as several apparatuses for the administration of volatile anesthetic agents. The Magill curve of an endotracheal tube is also named for Magill.

The first hospital anesthesia department was established at the Massachusetts General Hospital in 1936, under the leadership of Henry K. Beecher (1904–1976). Beecher, who received his training in surgery, had no previous experience in anesthesia.

Although initially used to reduce the sequelae of spasticity associated with electroconvulsive therapy for psychiatric disease, curare found use in the operating rooms at Bellvue by E.M. Papper and Stuart Cullen in the 1940s using preparations made by Squibb. This neuromuscular blockade permitted complete paralysis of the diaphragm and enabled control of ventilation via positive pressure ventilation. Mechanical ventilation first became common place with the polio epidemics of the 1950s, most notably in Denmark where an outbreak in 1952 lead to the creation of critical care medicine out of anesthesia. At first anesthesiologists hesitated to bring the ventilator into the operating theater unless necessary, but by the 1960s it became standard operating room equipment.

Sir Robert Macintosh (1897–1989) achieved significant advances in techniques for tracheal intubation when he introduced his new curved laryngoscope blade in 1943. The Macintosh blade remains to this day the most widely used laryngoscope blade for orotracheal intubation. In 1949, Macintosh published a case report describing the novel use of a gum elastic urinary catheter as an endotracheal tube introducer to facilitate difficult tracheal intubation. Inspired by Macintosh's report, P. Hex Venn (who was at that time the anesthetic advisor to the British firm Eschmann Bros. & Walsh, Ltd.) set about developing an endotracheal tube introducer based on this concept. Venn's design was accepted in March 1973, and what became known as the Eschmann endotracheal tube introducer went into production later that year. The material of Venn's design was different from that of a gum elastic bougie in that it had two layers: a core of tube woven from polyester threads and an outer resin layer. This provided more stiffness but maintained the flexibility and the slippery surface. Other differences were the length (the new introducer was 60 cm (24 in), which is much longer than the gum elastic bougie) and the presence of a 35° curved tip, permitting it to be steered around obstacles.

For over a hundred years the mainstay of inhalational anesthetics remained ether with cyclopropane, which had been introduced in the 1930s. In 1956 halothane was introduced which had the significant advantage of not being flammable. This reduced the risk of operating room fires. In the sixties the halogenated ethers superseded Halothane due to the rare, but significant side effects of cardiac arrhythmias and liver toxicity. The first two halogenated ethers were methoxyflurane and enflurane. These in turn were replaced by the current standards of isoflurane, sevoflurane, and desflurane in the eighties and nineties although methoxyflurane remains in use for prehospital anesthesia in Australia as Penthrox. Halothane remains in common place throughout much of the developing world.

Many new intravenous and inhalational anesthetics were developed and brought into clinical use during the second half of the 20th century. Paul Janssen (1926–2003), the founder of Janssen Pharmaceutica, is credited with the development of over 80 pharmaceutical compounds. Janssen synthesized nearly all of the butyrophenone class of antipsychotic agents, beginning with haloperidol (1958) and droperidol (1961). These agents were rapidly integrated into the practice of anesthesia. In 1960, Janssen's team synthesized fentanyl, the first of the piperidinone-derived opioids. Fentanyl was followed by sufentanil (1974), alfentanil (1976), carfentanil (1976), and lofentanil (1980). Janssen and his team also developed etomidate (1964), a potent intravenous anesthetic induction agent.

The concept of using a fiberoptic endoscope for tracheal intubation was introduced by Peter Murphy, an English anesthetist, in 1967. By the mid-1980s, the flexible fiberoptic bronchoscope had become an indispensable instrument within the pulmonology and anesthesia communities.

== 21st century ==
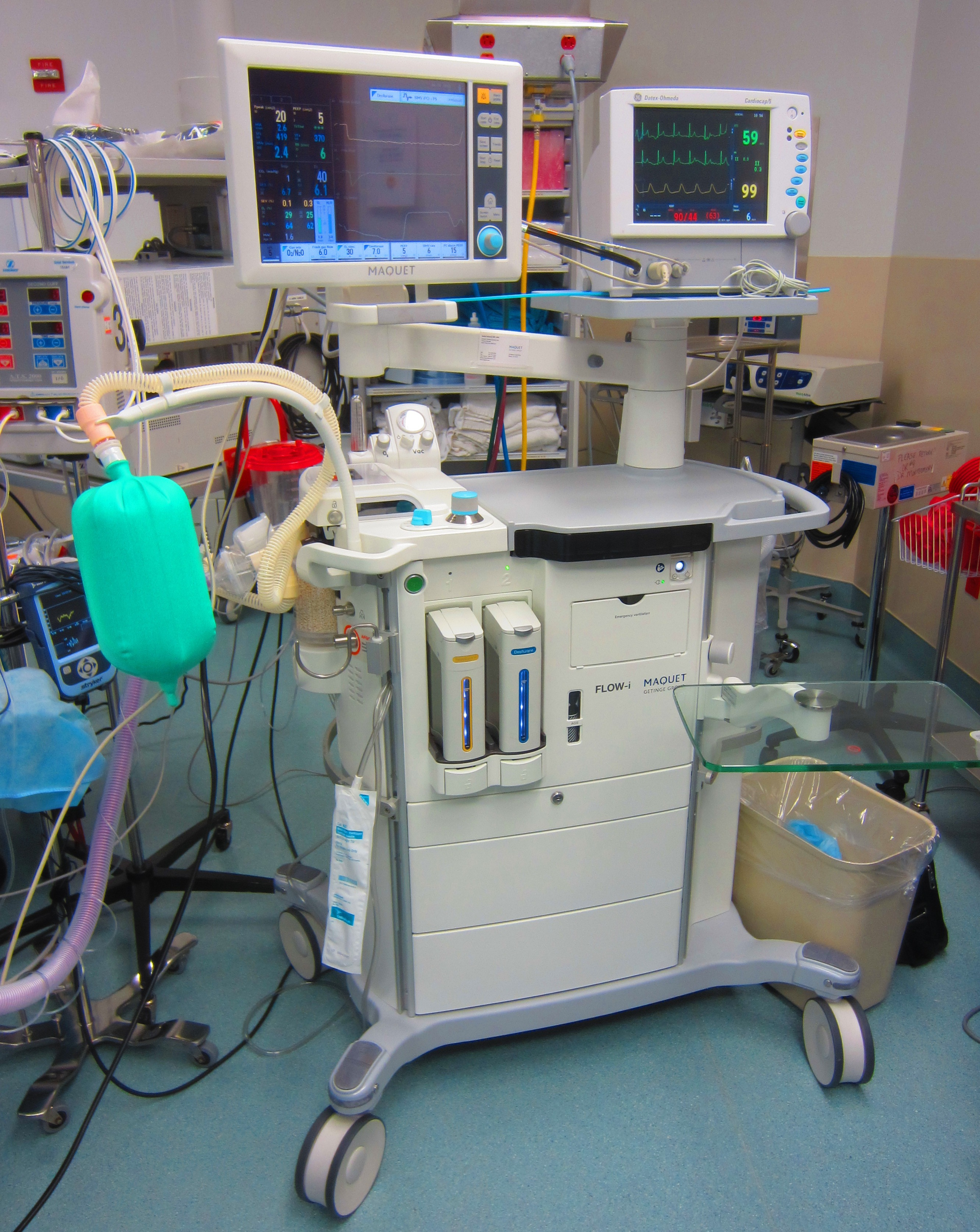
A modern anaesthetic machine. This particular machine is a "Flow-I" model, manufactured by Maquet.

The "digital revolution" of the 21st century has brought newer technology to the art and science of tracheal intubation. Several manufacturers have developed video laryngoscopes which employ digital technology such as the CMOS active pixel sensor (APS) to generate a view of the glottis so that the trachea may be intubated. The Glidescope video laryngoscope is one example of such a device.

Xenon, which does not act as a greenhouse gas, has recently been approved in some jurisdictions as an anaesthetic agent.

== See also ==
- ACE mixture
- American Association of Nurse Anesthesiology
- American Society of Anesthesiologists
- Anaesthetic machine
- ASA physical status classification system
- Blood transfusion
- Henry Edmund Gaskin Boyle
- Walter Channing (physician)
- Joseph Thomas Clover
- Curare
- James Esdaile
- General anaesthesia
- Arthur Ernest Guedel
- History of anatomy
- History of medicine
- History of neuraxial anesthesia
- History of neuroscience
- History of surgery
- History of tracheal intubation
- Local anesthesia
- Fidel Pagés
- Royal College of Anaesthetists
- John Snow
- Takamine Tokumei
- The Zoist: A Journal of Cerebral Physiology & Mesmerism, and Their Applications to Human Welfare
