= Petah Coyne =

American sculptor and photographer

- Born: 1953 (age 72–73); Oklahoma City
- Education: Art Academy of Cincinnati; Kent State University
- Known for: Sculpture and Photography
- Awards: Anonymous Was a Woman, Artist Grant (2007); Art Matters, Inc., Artist Grant (1989); Asian Cultural Council, Japan Fellowship (1992/1993); Augustus Saint-Gaudens Memorial Foundation, Sculpture Fellowship (1987); John Simon Guggenheim Foundation Fellowship (1989); National Endowment for the Arts, International Exchange Fellowship (1990); National Endowment for the Arts, Sculpture Fellowship (1990); National Endowment for the Arts, US/Mexico Creative Artists' Residency Grant, International Exchange (1994); New York Foundation for the Arts, Sculpture Fellowship (1988); Pollock-Krasner Foundation, Inc., Artists Grant (1987); Joan Mitchell Foundation Award for Sculpture (1998); The Rockefeller Foundation, Bellagio Residency (1990)
- Website: https://www.petahcoyne.org/

Petah Coyne (born 1953) is a contemporary American sculptor and photographer best known for her large and small scale hanging sculptures and floor installations. Working in innovative and disparate materials, her media has ranged from the organic to the ephemeral, from incorporating dead fish, mud, sticks, hay, hair, black sand, specially-formulated and patented wax, satin ribbons, silk flowers, to more recently, velvet, taxidermy, and cast wax statuary. Coyne's sculptures and photographs have been the subject of more than 30 solo museum exhibitions.

Her work is in numerous permanent museum collections, including the Museum of Modern Art, the Metropolitan Museum of Art, the Solomon R. Guggenheim Museum, the Whitney Museum of American Art, the Brooklyn Museum of Art, the Denver Art Museum, the Philadelphia Museum of Art, the San Francisco Museum of Modern Art, the Hirshhorn Museum and Sculpture Garden, the Smithsonian Institution, the Museum of Fine Arts, Boston, the Kemper Museum of Contemporary Art, Kiasma in Finland, the Montreal Museum of Fine Arts, Musée d'art contemporain de Montréal, the Toledo Museum of Art, the High Museum of Art, the Corcoran Gallery of Art, and the Nasher Museum of Art at Duke University.

Select awards given to Petah Coyne include the John Simon Guggenheim Memorial Foundation Fellowship, the Rockefeller Foundation Bellagio Residency, three National Endowment for the Arts Awards, the Pollock-Krasner Foundation Artist Grant, the Joan Mitchell Foundation Sculpture Grant, the Asian Cultural Council Japan Fellowship, the New York Foundation for the Arts Sculpture Fellowship, the Anonymous Was a Woman Artist Grant, the Augustus Saint-Gaudens Memorial Foundation Sculpture Fellowship, the Massachusetts Council on the Arts and Humanities New Works Grant, and the Art Matters Artist Grant.

== Early life and education ==
Coyne was born in Oklahoma City, Oklahoma in 1953 to a military family that moved frequently before settling in Dayton, Ohio. Although Coyne graduated from Oakwood High School, her mother home-schooled her in the summer so she could pass a number of classes early, making it possible for her to attend art classes at the University of Dayton, go to local foundries, create bronze castings, and go on painting expeditions. She attended Kent State University from 1972-1973 and then the Art Academy of Cincinnati, from which she graduated in 1977.

She moved in 1977 with her husband, Lamar Hall, from Ohio to SoHo.

== Career ==
Untitled #1458 (Marguerite Duras), 2019-2020, National Museum of Women in the Arts, Washington, D.C.

Coyne lives and works in New York. Recent solo exhibitions include: "Petah Coyne: Having Gone I Will Return" at Galerie Lelong & Co. (2018), "Petah Coyne: A Free Life" at Nunu Fine Art (2016), and "Petah Coyne: Everything that Rises Must Converge" at the Massachusetts Museum of Contemporary Art (2010). Coyne is represented by Galerie Lelong & Co., in New York, and Nunu Fine Art in Taipei, Taiwan.

=== Recent solo exhibitions ===
==== "Petah Coyne: Having Gone I Will Return" at Galerie Lelong & Co., 2018 ====
In 2018 Coyne had her first solo exhibition in New York City in over a decade, "Petah Coyne: Having Gone, I Will Return," at Galerie Lelong & Co. Enlisting the help of couture seamstresses, Coyne learned techniques to manipulate fabric and create a new monumental work, Untitled #1379 (The Doctor's Wife), which became the centerpiece of the exhibition. The piece was inspired by the book The Doctor's Wife, a novel by Sawako Ariyoshi written in 1966.

==== "Petah Coyne: A Free Life" at Nunu Fine Art, 2016 ====
In 2016, Coyne had her first Taiwanese solo exhibition at Nunu Fine Art in Taipei. "Petah Coyne: A Free Life" featured a collection of dynamic black and white photographs alongside recent sculptures, such as Untitled #1424 (Zhang Yimou) and Untitled #1421 (Ha Jin), a large hanging work with blue and white waxed flowers surrounding a steel armature. This exhibition takes its name from Ha Jin's 2007 novel, A Free Life.

==== "Petah Coyne: Everything that Rises Must Converge" at MASS MoCA, 2010 ====
Petah Coyne's 2010 solo exhibition, "Everything That Rises Must Converge," at the MASS MoCA (May 29, 2010) was her largest retrospective exhibition to date and featured large-scale mixed-media sculptures along with silver gelatin print photographs. The works included in the exhibition range from earlier, more abstract sculptures made from industrial materials, to newer ones made with delicate wax. In these newer works, Coyne layers wax-covered materials such as pearls, ribbons and silk flowers into large sculptural forms, often incorporating taxidermied birds and animals.

Like the wide array of materials used throughout her oeuvre, Coyne derives inspiration from a variety of sources, such as literature, film, world culture, the natural environment, and personal stories. Her work is described as having a "Baroque sense of decadent refinement," imbued with a magical quality that details deeply personal responses to her inspirations, while inviting viewers to consider their own.

This exhibition highlighted not only the diversity of Coyne's work and her innovative use of materials (including black sand, car parts, satin ribbons, trees, silk flowers, and taxidermy), but the relationships between the wide-ranging phases of her practice as it has evolved over time.

=== The Real Guerrillas: The Early Years ===
In 2016, Petah Coyne and Kathy Grove debuted their project The Real Guerrillas: The Early Years, at Galerie Lelong in New York, Narrative/Collaborative, an exhibition of photographic works generated through collaborative practices. The Guerrilla Girls are an anonymous group of feminist, female artists devoted to fighting sexism and racism within the art world. The project comprises two portraits of each woman who participated from 1985 through 2000. One photographic portrait depicts the selected member as her "alias," masked and costumed while the second depicts the artist as herself, without a mask, in her studio surrounded by her work. As members pass away and their identities can be safely revealed, both portraits will be exhibited allowing their contributions to be fully acknowledged.

== See also ==
- Inside the Artist's Studio, Princeton Architectural Press, 2015. (ISBN 978-1616893040)
