= Pignose =

Portable guitar amp manufacturer

- Founded: 1969; 56 years ago
- Founder: Richard Edlund; Wayne Kimbell
- Products: portable, battery-powered guitar amplifier
- Parent: Aria

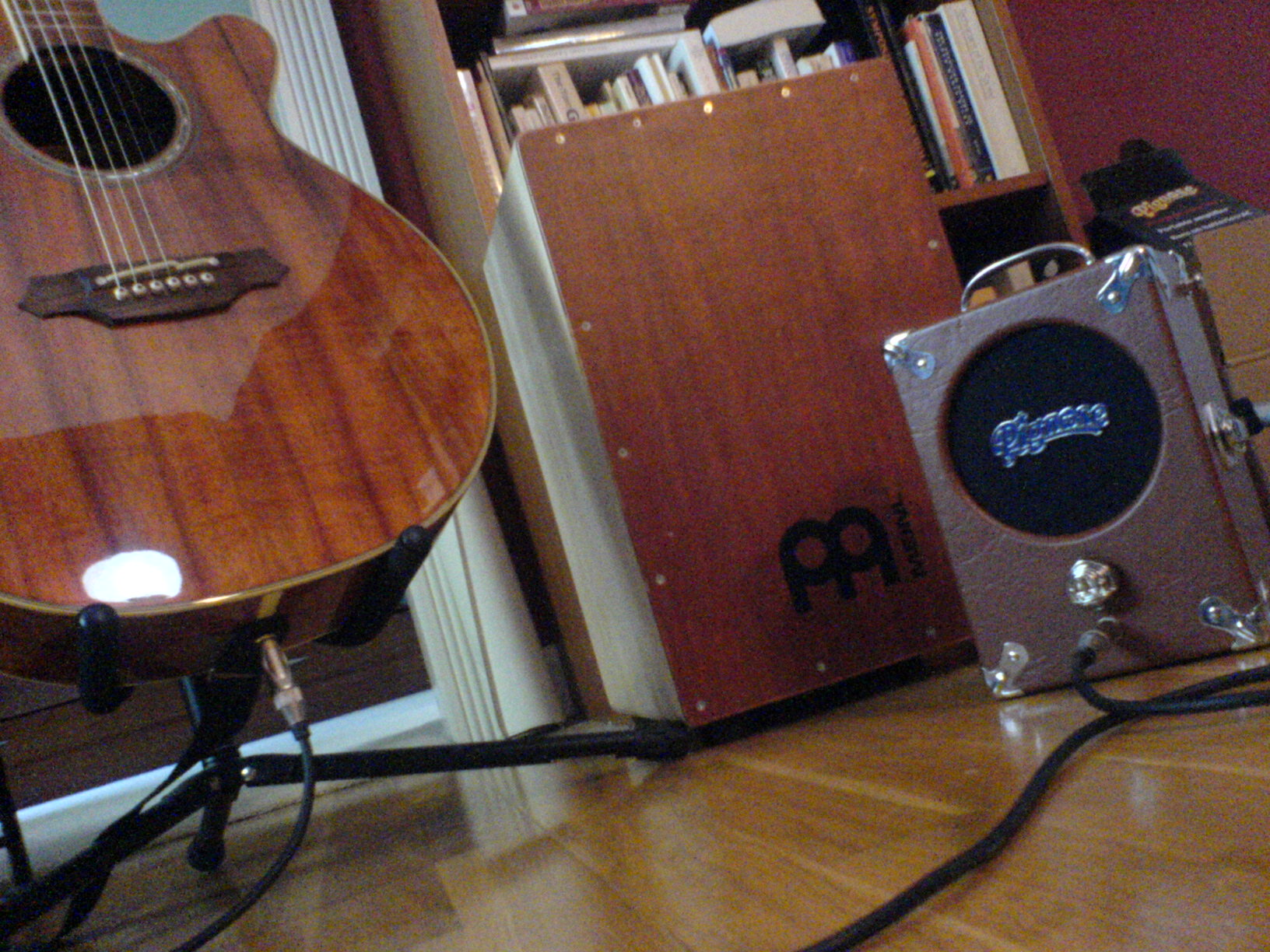
A Pignose amplifier (on the right), teamed with a Takamine guitar and a Meinl cajon percussion instrument

Pignose-Gorilla, commonly known as Pignose, is a manufacturer of portable, battery-powered guitar amplifiers, as well as AC-powered practice amps and guitars. The company was founded in 1969 by Richard Edlund and Wayne Kimbell. In 1985, Pignose Industries was acquired by Howard Chatt and called Pignose - Gorilla. In 2023, Pignose was acquired by Aria guitars, based in Japan. In the United States, Pignose is distributed by LPD Music International, based out of Madison Heights MI.

== Legendary 7-100 ==
The first Pignose amplifier was a battery-powered, five-watt portable guitar amplifier with one five-inch speaker. It is considered the first portable electric guitar amplifier. The inventors gave 65 prototypes (with rubber volume knobs shaped like the end of a pig's nose) to some of the most famous musicians of the era, including Led Zeppelin, The Rolling Stones, The Beatles, The Eagles, and The Who. Terry Kath (of Chicago) was given one which led to a partnership with the group and its management team in 1972.

Pignose Industries was started by Terry Kath and other members/associates of the band, Chicago, in 1972. They introduced their product (designed and patented by Wayne Kimbell and Richard Edlund) to the music industry at the 1973 Summer NAMM show, with tongue-in-cheek hyperbole, as the "Legendary" Pignose Amplifier. Now known officially as the "Legendary 7-100," the amplifier is still in production and used primarily as a portable practice amp. It has also found a role in recording studios, having been used on records by Joe Walsh, Eric Clapton and Frank Zappa.

The 7-100 includes hanger buttons for a guitar strap, allowing a musician to carry the amplifier while standing or walking. The 7-100 is powered by six AA batteries or an optional AC adapter and weighs between five and six pounds (2.27-2.72 kg). Another feature is the hinged case design, allowing the user not only to store objects like the cable and strap inside the amp, but also to open the case slightly to alter the tone to the player's preference. A feature for the more serious musician is the preamplifier output jack on the rear, allowing it to be connected to a larger amplifier for use as a guitar distortion effect.

== Other products ==
In addition to the 7-100, the company offers two battery-powered portable models called "Hog" that use integral rechargeable batteries, as well as small solid-state amplifiers.

Around 2010 Pignose began manufacturing travel guitars with built in amplifiers.
