= Chuan xiong =

Chuan xiong may refer to:

- Chou Chuan-huing (pinyin: Zhōu Chuánxióng) (born 1969), Taiwanese composer and singer
- Ligusticum wallichii, a medicinal herb used in Chinese herbology
