= Hanaoka Seishū =

Japanese surgeon

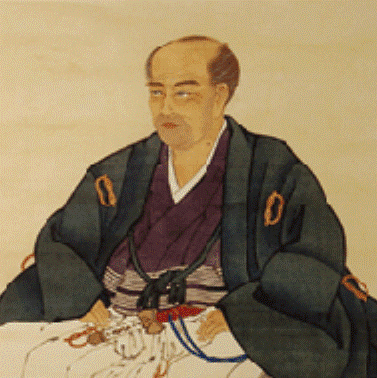
- Hanaoka Seishū
- Born: October 23, 1760; Hirayama, Naga District, Kii Province, (now Wakayama Prefecture), Japan
- Died: November 21, 1835 (aged 75); Japan
- Citizenship: Japan
- Education: Kyoto, Japan
- Known for: first to perform surgery using general anesthesia
- Scientific career
- Fields: Medicine, surgery
- Workplaces: Japan
- Academic advisors: Nangai Yoshimasu (1750-1813)

Hanaoka Seishū (華岡 青洲; October 23, 1760 – November 21, 1835) was a Japanese surgeon of the Edo period with a knowledge of Chinese herbal medicine, as well as Western surgical techniques he had learned through Rangaku (literally "Dutch learning", and by extension "Western learning"). Hanaoka is said to have been the first to perform surgery using general anesthesia.

== History ==
Hanaoka studied medicine in Kyoto, and became a medical practitioner in Wakayama prefecture, located near Osaka, where he was born. Seishū Hanaoka learned traditional Japanese medicine as well as Dutch-imported European surgery. Due to the nation's self-imposed isolation policy of Sakoku, few foreign medical texts were permitted into Japan at that time. This limited the exposure of Hanaoka and other Japanese physicians to Western medical developments.

Perhaps the most notable Japanese surgeon of the Edo period, Hanaoka was famous for combining Dutch and Japanese surgery and introducing modern surgical techniques to Japan. Hanaoka successfully operated for hydrocele, anal fistula, and even performed certain kinds of plastic surgery. He was the first surgeon in the world to use general anaesthesia in surgery and the first to operate on cancers of the breast and oropharynx, to remove necrotic bone, and to perform amputations of the extremities in Japan.

== Hua Tuo and mafeisan ==
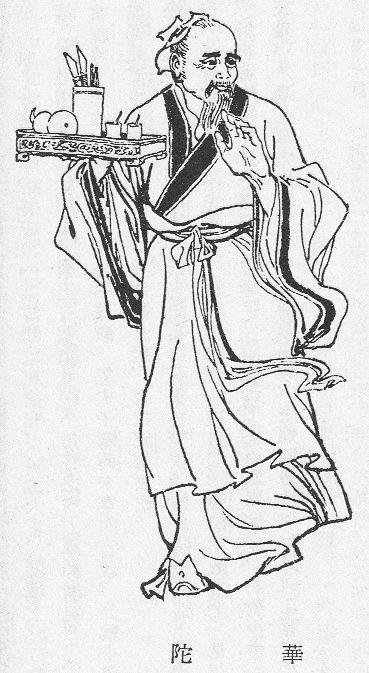
Hua Tuo, Chinese surgeon, circa AD 200

Hua Tuo (華佗, ca. AD 145-220) was a Chinese surgeon of the 2nd century AD. According to the Records of Three Kingdoms (ca. AD 270) and the Book of the Later Han (ca. AD 430), Hua Tuo performed surgery under general anesthesia using a formula he had developed by mixing wine with a mixture of herbal extracts he called mafeisan (麻沸散). Hua Tuo reportedly used mafeisan to perform even major operations such as resection of gangrenous intestines. Before the surgery, he administered an oral anesthetic potion, probably dissolved in wine, in order to induce a state of unconsciousness and partial neuromuscular blockade.

The exact composition of mafeisan, similar to all of Hua Tuo's clinical knowledge, was lost when he burned his manuscripts, just before his death. The composition of the anesthetic powder was not mentioned in either the Records of Three Kingdoms or the Book of the Later Han. Because Confucian teachings regarded the body as sacred and surgery was considered a form of body mutilation, surgery was strongly discouraged in ancient China. Because of this, despite Hua Tuo's reported success with general anesthesia, the practice of surgery in ancient China ended with his death.

The name mafeisan combines ma (麻, meaning "cannabis, hemp, numbed or tingling"), fei (沸, meaning "boiling or bubbling"), and san (散, meaning "to break up or scatter", or "medicine in powder form"). Therefore, the word mafeisan probably means something like "boiled cannabis powder". Many sinologists and scholars of traditional Chinese medicine have guessed at the composition of Hua Tuo's mafeisan powder, but the exact components still remain unclear. His formula is believed to have contained some combination of:

- bai zhi (Angelica dahurica),
- cao wu (草烏, Aconitum kusnezoffii, Aconitum kusnezoffii, Kusnezoff's monkshood, or wolfsbane root),
- chuān xiōng (Ligusticum wallichii, or Szechuan lovage),
- dong quai (Angelica sinensis, or "female ginseng"),
- wu tou (烏頭, Aconitum carmichaelii, rhizome of Aconitum, or Chinese monkshood"),
- yang jin hua (洋金花, Flos Daturae metelis (dried flowers of Datura metel), or Datura stramonium, jimson weed, devil's trumpet, thorn apple, locoweed, moonflower),
- ya pu lu (Mandragora officinarum)
- rhododendron flower, and
- jasmine root.

Others have suggested the potion may have also contained hashish, bhang, shang-luh, or opium. Victor H. Mair wrote that mafei "appears to be a transcription of some Indo-European word related to "morphine"." Some authors believe that Hua Tuo may have discovered surgical analgesia by acupuncture, and that mafeisan either had nothing to do with or was simply an adjunct to his strategy for anesthesia. Many physicians have attempted to re-create the same formulation based on historical records but none have achieved the same clinical efficacy as Hua Tuo's. In any event, Hua Tuo's formula did not appear to be effective for major operations.

== Formulation of tsūsensan ==
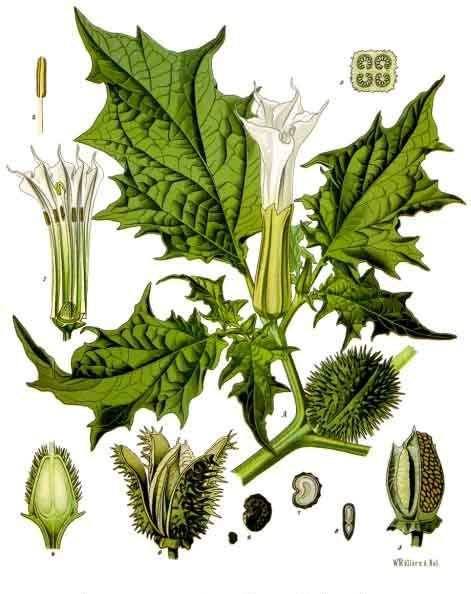
Datura stramonium, also known as Korean morning glory, thorn apple or jimson weed)

Hanaoka was intrigued when he learned about Hua Tuo's mafeisan potion. Beginning in about 1785, Hanaoka embarked on a quest to re-create a compound that would have pharmacologic properties similar to Hua Tuo's mafeisan. His wife, who participated in his experiments as a volunteer, lost her sight due to adverse side effects. After years of research and experimentation, he finally developed a formula which he named tsūsensan (also known as mafutsu-san). Like that of Hua Tuo, this compound was composed of extracts of several different plants, including:

- 8 parts yang jin hua (Datura stramonium, Korean morning glory, thorn apple, jimson weed, devil's trumpet, stinkweed, or locoweed);
- 2 parts bai zhi (Angelica dahurica);
- 2 parts cao wu (Aconitum sp., monkshood or wolfsbane);
- 2 parts chuān ban xia (Pinellia ternata);
- 2 parts chuān xiōng (Ligusticum wallichii, Cnidium rhizome, Cnidium officinale or Szechuan lovage);
- 2 parts dong quai (Angelica sinensis or female ginseng);
- 1 part tian nan xing (Arisaema rhizomatum or cobra lily).

Some sources claim that Angelica archangelica (often referred to as garden angelica, holy ghost, or wild celery) was also an ingredient.

Reportedly the mixture was ground to a paste, boiled in water, and administered as a drink. After 2 to 4 hours the patient would become insensitive to pain and then lapse into unconsciousness. Depending on the dosage, they might remain unconscious for 6–24 hours. The active ingredients in tsūsensan were scopolamine, hyoscyamine, atropine, aconitine and angelicotoxin. When consumed in sufficient quantity, tsūsensan produced a state of general anesthesia and skeletal muscle paralysis.

Shutei Nakagawa (1773–1850), a close friend of Hanaoka, wrote a small pamphlet entitled "Mayaku-ko" ("narcotic powder") in 1796. Although the original manuscript was lost in a fire in 1867, this brochure described the current state of Hanaoka's research on general anesthesia.

== Use of tsūsensan as a general anesthetic ==
Once perfected, Hanaoka began to administer his new sedative drink to induce a state of consciousness equivalent to or approximating that of modern general anesthesia to his patients. Kan Aiya (藍屋勘) was a 60-year-old woman whose family was beset by breast cancer - Kan being the last of her kin alive. On 13 October 1804, Hanaoka performed a partial mastectomy for breast cancer on Kan Aiya, using tsūsensan as a general anesthetic. This is regarded today by some as the first reliable documentation of an operation to be performed under general anesthesia. Nearly forty years would pass before Crawford Long used general anesthesia in Jefferson, Georgia.

Hanaoka's success in performing this painless operation soon became widely known, and patients began to arrive from all parts of Japan. Hanaoka went on to perform many operations using tsūsensan, including resection of malignant tumors, extraction of bladder stones, and extremity amputations. Before his death in 1835, Hanaoka performed more than 150 operations for breast cancer. He also devised and modified surgical instruments, and trained and educated many students, using his own philosophy for medical management. Hanaoka attracted many students, and his surgical techniques became known as the Hanaoka method.

== Publications ==
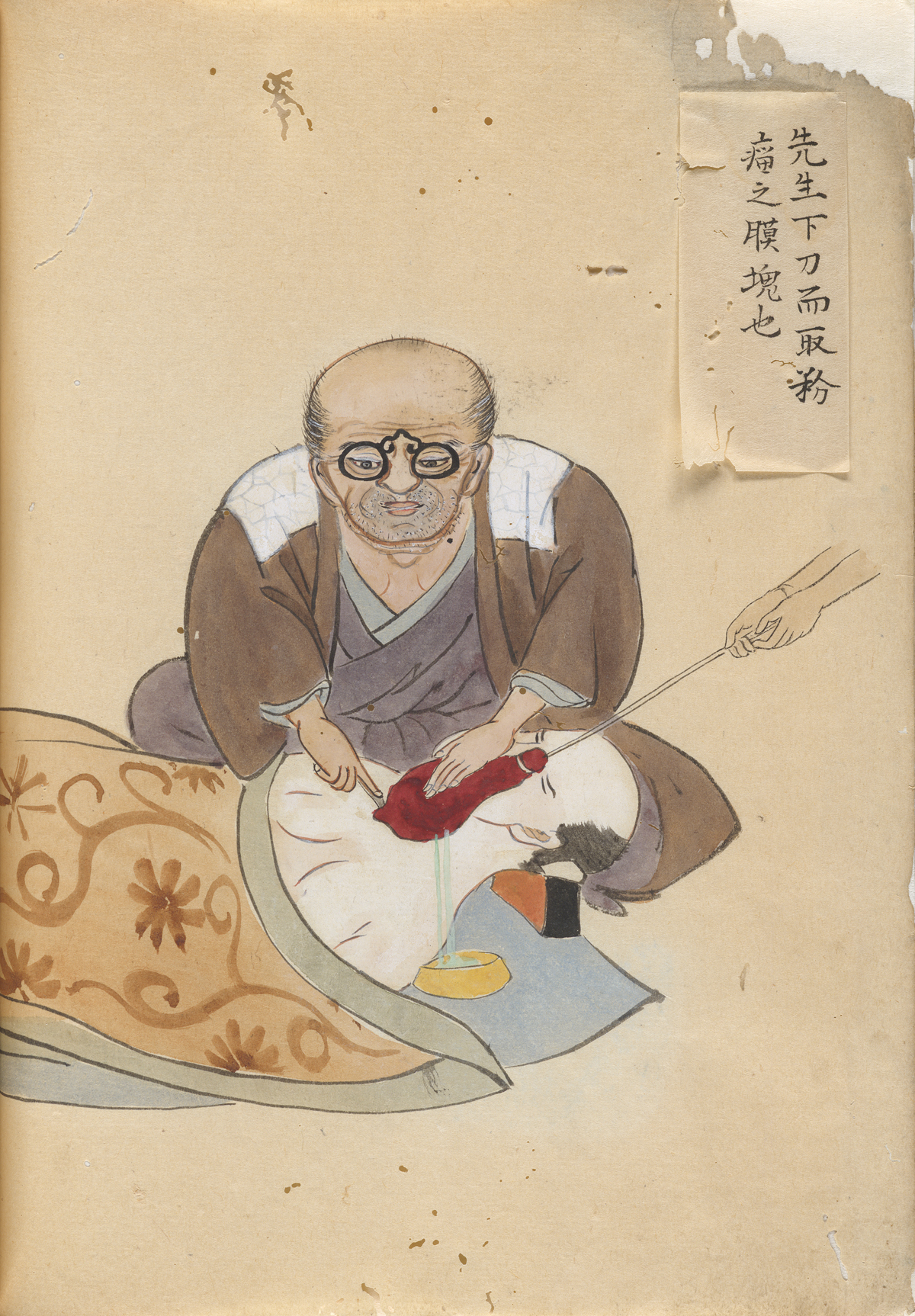
Image from "Surgical Casebook" (Kishitsu geryō zukan) by Hanaoka Seishu

Hanaoka wrote the following works. None of these were printed books. Rather (as was the custom in Japan at that time), they were all handwritten manuscripts which were later reproduced by his students for their personal use.

- 1805: Nyuigan chiken-roku, a one-volume book that provides a detailed description of Hanaoka's first operation for mammary carcinoma.
- 1805: Nyugan saijo shujutsu-zu, a one-volume book that provides a detailed description of Hanaoka's first operation for mammary carcinoma.
- 1809: Nyuigan zufu, an illustrated emakimono in one roll which also pictured breast cancer.
- 1820: Geka tekiyio, a one volume text.
- 1838: Hanaoka-ke chiken zumaki, an illustrated emakimono scroll depicting 86 different cases, including surgical resection of fibromas and elephantiasis of the genitalia.).
- Date unknown: Hanaoka-shi chijitsu zushiki, a one-volume illustrated book that depicts his operations for the treatment of conditions such as phimosis, arthritis, necrosis, choanal atresia, and hemorrhoids.
- Date unknown: Seishuiidan, a series of essays on Hanaoka's medical and surgical experiences.
- Date unknown: Yoka hosen, a one volume text.
- Date unknown: Yoka shinsho, a one volume text on surgery.
- Date unknown: Yoka sagen, a two volume text on surgery.

The surgical teachings of Hanaoka were also preserved in a series of eight handwritten books by unnamed pupils, but known to us by the following titles: Shoka shinsho, Shoka sagen, Kinso yojutsu, Kinso kuju, Geka chakuyo, Choso benmei, Nyuiganben, and Koho benran. No dates are known for any of these writings. Since Hanaoka himself made only manuscript copies and none were ever published, it is doubtful if many copies of his surgical writings are now extant.

== Legacy ==
Though some of his patients are said to have benefited from Hanaoka's work, it apparently had no impact upon the development of general anesthesia in the rest of the world. The national isolation policy of the Tokugawa shogunate prevented Hanaoka's achievements from being publicized until after the isolation ended in 1854. By that time, different techniques for general anesthesia had already been independently developed by American and European scientists and physicians. The Japan Society of Anesthesiologists however has incorporated a representation of the Korean morning glory flower in their logo in honor of Hanaoka's pioneering work.

Hanaoka's house has been preserved in his hometown (Naga-cho, Kinokawa, Wakayama). It has various interactive exhibits in both Japanese and English. It is adjacent to a nursing college, and many locally trained doctors and nurses pay homage to Hanaoka and his works.

== Popular culture ==
The Japanese author Sawako Ariyoshi wrote a novel entitled The Doctor's Wife (Japanese 華岡青洲の妻), based on the actual life of Hanaoka Seishū mixed with a fictional conflict between his mother and his wife. The novel was subsequently filmed as a 1967 movie directed by Yasuzo Masumura, Hanaoka Seishū no tsuma (aka "The Wife of Seishu Hanaoka").

== See also ==
- History of general anesthesia
- Takamine Tokumei
