= Nakauchi =

Nakauchi (written: 中内) is a Japanese surname. Notable people with the surname include:

- Isao Nakauchi (中内 功, 1922–2005), Japanese businessman
- Paul Nakauchi (born 1969), American actor and voice actor

== See also ==
- Nakachi
