= The River Ki =

1959 Japanese novel

First English-language edition (publ.Kodansha)

The River Ki (紀ノ川, Kinokawa) is a 1959 Japanese novel by Sawako Ariyoshi. It was first published in serialised form in the magazine Fujin Gahō between January and May 1959. Set in Wakayama Prefecture, the novel's focus is on three generations of women representing modern Japanese history, beginning in 1898 and ending in the mid-20th century.

== Translations ==
An English translation was published in 1980. The novel has also been translated into French and Russian language, as well as into German via the English translation.

== Adaptations ==
The River Ki was adapted into a film under the title The Kii River in 1966.

== Bibliography ==
- Ariyoshi, Sawako (1959). 紀ノ川 (Kinokawa). Tokyo: Chūōkōron-sha.
- Ariyoshi, Sawako (1980). The River Ki. Translated by Tahara, Mildred. Tokyo, New York, and San Francisco: Kodansha International.
