= The Twilight Years =

1972 novel by Sawako Ariyoshi

The Twilight Years, a 1972 Japanese novel by Sawako Ariyoshi, sold over a million copies in her home country and was praised by the Japan-studies community in foreign countries as a singular novel, "the closest representation of modern Japanese life" according to Donald Keene and a forthright, insightful work into the experience of modern Japanese women.

The book was translated from the Japanese by Mildred Tahara and published by Peter Owen, London 1984 (ISBN 0-7206-0607-1).

The work, which begins with the married protagonist's father-in-law seemingly doddering around in senility on a winter street underdressed, deals with the twin issues of Aging of Japan and role of women in Japan, who were/are de facto expected to be caretakers of elderly parents or grandparents in a household. Although the novel at times digresses into what may be characterized as a mere extended complaint about the subservient role women experience in Japan (most poignantly, as the protagonist realizes that her husband may very well forget her name as he grows dodderingly old), the work was prescient in that it foreshadowed the current demographic crisis facing Japan, i.e. a population rapidly entering old age without sufficient young workers to take care of the problems of advanced senescence.

Even-paced and slowly charting the twists and turns of emotion as the family struggles with an old man who is barely continent, The Twilight Years remains an academically respected work although unknown to the general population. Like much of Japanese literature, the emotion is understated, yet contains both a slice-of-life approach and a broad overview of the problems/dilemmas facing modern life along with 'neat' coincidences of time/space. Lacking historical grandeur, the sweep of war, or tremendous social upheaval, the work is yet compact, moving and dedicated.

== Adaptation ==
The novel was adapted into a film of the same name by Shirō Toyoda in 1973.
