= The Twilight Years (film) =

1973 film by Shirō Toyoda

- Film poster

Japanese name
- Kanji: 恍惚の人
- Directed by: Shirō Toyoda
- Screenplay by: Zenzo Matsuyama
- Based on: The Twilight Years by Sawako Ariyoshi
- Starring: Hisaya Morishige; Hideko Takamine; Takahiro Tamura; Hiroko Shino; Takashi Itō
- Cinematography: Kozo Okazaki
- Edited by: Sachiko Yamaji
- Music by: Masaru Sato
- Production company: Geiensha
- Distributed by: Toho
- Release date: 15 January 1973 (Japan)
- Running time: 102 minutes
- Country: Japan
- Language: Japanese

The Twilight Years (Japanese: 恍惚の人, Hepburn: Kōkotsu no hito) is a 1973 Japanese drama film directed by Shirō Toyoda and based on the novel of the same name by Sawako Ariyoshi.

== Cast ==
- Hisaya Morishige as Shigezo Tachibana
- Hideko Takamine as Akiko Tachibana
- Takahiro Tamura as Nobutshi Tachibana
- Hiroko Shino as Emi
- Takashi Itō as Yamagishi
- Kumeko Urabe as Old lady
- Hideko Yoshida as Kuniko Segawa
- Akiko Nomura as Chi Oikawa
- Nobuko Otowa as Kyoko
- Nobuo Nakamura as Fujieda
