= The Kii River =

1966 Japanese film

- Theatrical poster
- 紀ノ川
- Directed by: Noboru Nakamura
- Screenplay by: Eijirō Hisaita
- Based on: The River Ki; by Sawako Ariyoshi
- Produced by: Masao Shirai
- Starring: Yoko Tsukasa; Shima Iwashita; Chieko Higashiyama; Takahiro Tamura; Tetsuro Tamba
- Cinematography: Tōichirō Narushima
- Edited by: Keiichi Uraoka
- Music by: Toru Takemitsu
- Production company: Shochiku
- Distributed by: Shochiku
- Release date: 11 June 1966 (Japan)
- Running time: 173 minutes
- Country: Japan
- Language: Japanese

The Kii River (Japanese: 紀ノ川, Hepburn: Kinokawa) is a 1966 Japanese drama film directed by Noboru Nakamura, based on the novel The River Ki by Sawako Ariyoshi.

== Cast ==
- Yoko Tsukasa as Hana
- Shima Iwashita as Fumio
- Chieko Higashiyama as Toyono
- Takahiro Tamura as Keisaku Maya
- Tetsuro Tamba as Kosaku Maya
- Yuki Arikawa as Hanako
- Kiyoshi Nonomura as Nobuki

== Release ==
The Kii River premiered in Japanese cinemas on 11 June 1966. It was released on DVD in Japan in 2006.

== Reception ==
The Kii River reached number three on Kinema Junpo's list of the ten best Japanese films of 1966.

In his Critical Handbook of Japanese Film Directors, Alexander Jacoby called The Kii River a "richly atmospheric and beautifully acted film". Film historian Donald Richie titled the film, along with Nakamura's Twin Sisters of Kyoto, a "persuasive" adaptation of its literary source.

== Awards ==
- 1966 Blue Ribbon Award, Mainichi Film Award and Kinema Junpo Award for Best Actress Yoko Tsukasa
- 1966 Blue Ribbon Award for Best Score Toru Takemitsu
