= Takamine =

Takamine (高峰 or 高嶺) is a Japanese family name, translated literally as high ridge or high peak. It may refer to:

== Company ==
- Takamine (guitar manufacturer), Japanese acoustic guitar manufacturer founded in 1962 and based in Nakatsugawa, Japan.

== Locations ==
- Mount Takamine, a mountain in Japan.

== People ==
- Gō Takamine (1948-), Japanese film director
- Hideko Takamine (1924–2010), Japanese film actress
- Takamine Hideo (1854–1910), Japanese educator
- Jōkichi Takamine (1854–1922), Japanese chemist
- Takamine Tokumei (1653–1738), Japanese surgeon
- Takamine Toshio (1885–1959), Japanese physicist

== Fictional characters ==
- Kiyo Takamine, a character in the manga series Zatch Bell!
- Noa Takamine, a character in the video game The Idolmaster Cinderella Girls: Starlight Stage
- Tsukasa Takamine, a character in the anime television series Sasami: Magical Girls Club

== See also ==
- Epinephrine, by trade name Takamine
