= Dong Feng (physician) =

3rd Century Eastern Han physician

Dong Feng (Chinese: 董奉; c. 200–280), courtesy name Junyì (Chinese: 君異) was a famed practitioner of traditional Chinese medicine during the Eastern Han period. He hailed from Houguan (modern Fuzhou, Fujian). Dong Feng, together with Hua Tuo and Zhang Zhongjing, was one of the "Three physicians of Jian'an", although his skill was ranked the lowest of the three. The physician Ge Hong wrote a biography of Dong Feng in the Shenxian zhuan.

== The apricot forest ==
Many legends surround the life and work of Dong Feng. As a physician, it is said that Dong Feng would refuse monetary payment for his services. Instead, he would ask patients successfully cured of minor ailments to plant a single apricot kernel, and those cured of severe ailments were asked to plant three kernels. A forest of apricot trees came to surround his home as a testament to his skill. Dong Feng became known as "He of the apricot forest". Later generations would come to describe physicians and those in the medical profession poetically as being "Those of the apricot forest", and their place of work, i.e. hospitals, as being "apricot forests".

Dong Feng allowed people to pick his apricots in exchange for an equal amount of grain. Ge Hong recounts a story of one man who tried to take a greater quantity of apricots than the grain he had offered to Dong Feng. Five tigers appeared as the man departed from the apricot grove. He was frightened by tigers and spilled several of his apricots. By chance, the remaining apricots in the man's container equaled the grain that he had paid to Dong Feng, so the tigers stopped chasing him.
