= Nakachi =

Nakachi (written: 中地) is a Japanese surname. Notable people with the surname include:

- Nakachi Kijin (仲地 親雲上 紀仁, 1789–1859), Ryukyuan scholar-bureaucrat, physician, and surgeon
- Mai Nakachi (中地 舞, born 1980), Japanese footballer
