= Nakachi Kijin =

Nakachi Pekumi Kijin (仲地 親雲上 紀仁; 3 February 1789 – 7 April 1859) was a scholar-bureaucrat, medical doctor and surgeon of the Ryūkyū Kingdom. He was the first surgeon on Okinawa to give vaccinations against cowpox.

It was standard at the time for members of Ryūkyū's aristocratic class to have two names: a Chinese style name (唐名, Karana) and a Japanese style name (大和名, Yamatona). "Nakachi Kijin" was his Japanese style name, while Shō Keishin (松 景愼) was his Chinese style name.

== Life ==
Nakachi was born in a physician's family; both his father and grandfather were surgeons. When he was 26 years old, he went to Fuzhou to study internal medicine and ophthalmology. Three years later, he decided to go home, but was caught in a storm midway there and later drifted into the Satsuma Domain. He studied surgery there, and went back to Ryukyu one year later.

He studied cowpox vaccination from Bernard Jean Bettelheim, the first Christian missionary to Ryukyu, in 1846. He had done a long-term experiment, and began to give the cowpox vaccine two years later. He received rewards from the king, Shō Iku, and was appointed "imperial physician" (御医者).

== See also ==
- Takamine Tokumei
- Itō Genboku
