= Takamine Tokumei =

Okinawan interpreter

Takamine Tokumei (Gi Shitetsu)
- Born: February 15, 1653; Shuri, Ryukyu Kingdom
- Died: 1738 (aged 84–85)
- Occupation: Interpreter (Chinese-Okinawan language)
- Known for: Performance of harelip surgery for the grandson of King Shō Tei, under general anesthesia after learning the surgery in China

Takamine Ueekata Tokumei (高嶺 親方 徳明; February 15, 1653 – 1738) was an Okinawan interpreter (Chinese-Okinawan). He was ordered to learn harelip surgery and successfully performed the surgery for the grandson of King Shō Tei, Shō Eki, under general anesthesia.

It was standard at the time for members of Ryūkyū's aristocratic class to have two names: Chinese style name (唐名, Karana) and Japanese style name (大和名, Yamatona). "Takamine Tokumei" was his Japanese style name, while Gi Shitetsu (魏 士哲) was his Chinese style name.

== Life and achievements ==
He was born on February 15, 1653, in Shuri, Ryūkyū Kingdom. He travelled to Fuzhou at age 10, and learned Chinese in three years. He became an interpreter and he was given the name 魏士哲(Gi Shitetsu) by King Sho Tei. In 1688, he was a secretary and was on his 4th visit to Fuzhou, and he learned that a boatman received surgery and his harelip was corrected. The grandson of King Shō Tei, Shō Eki, had harelip. The four representatives of the Ryūkyū Kingdom at Fuzhou ordered Tokumei to learn surgery because of his Chinese and his skill. Earlier, a secretary named Oomine Sen-yu (大嶺詮雄, birth and death unknown) was ordered to learn surgery but he was unsuccessful. The Chinese physician was Huang Huiyou (Chinese: 黄會友; in Japanese: Kō Kaiyū). He first refused to teach surgery because it was a secret, but finally agreed to teach surgery due to the eagerness of Tokumei. After 20 days of learning, Tokumei showed his skill and corrected the harelip of a 13-year-old boy before his teacher. Tokumei was given a book of the surgery and returned to Okinawa Island in May, 1689. He performed surgery on 5 patients and performed surgery for the King's 10-year-old grandson Shō Eki on October 23. The surgery was successful and it was said that no scar was visible. He performed the surgery under general anesthesia, 115 years prior to Hanaoka Seishu who performed the removal of mammary cancer under general anesthesia, the first general anesthesia in Japan. In 1690 he taught Satsuma doctors this surgery and in 1714 to Ryūkyūan doctors.

== Matsuki Akitomo ==
It was Matsuki Akitomo, the professor of anesthesiology, Hirosaki University who reported about this surgery first in the medical world. He wrote that a half century has passed since K. Higaonna, a historian from Okinawa, first reported that in 1689 Tokumei Takamine (1653–1738) had performed successfully a hare-lip operation under general anesthesia with mafutsu-san for a royal grandchild Shō Eki of the Second Shō Dynasty in the Ryukyus, now known as Okinawa.

== See also ==
- History of general anesthesia
- Hanaoka Seishū
- Nakachi Kijin
