= Oreocome =

Scientific classification
- Kingdom: Plantae
- Clade: Tracheophytes
- Clade: Angiosperms
- Clade: Eudicots
- Clade: Asterids
- Order: Apiales
- Family: Apiaceae
- Subfamily: Apioideae
- Tribe: Selineae
- Genus: Oreocome; Edgew.

Genus of plants

Oreocome is a genus of flowering plants belonging to the family Apiaceae.

Its native range is Afghanistan to Southern Central China.

Species:

- Oreocome aegopodioides Pimenov & Kljuykov
- Oreocome arguta (Lindl.) Pimenov & Kljuykov
- Oreocome depauperata Pimenov & Kljuykov
- Oreocome duriuscula (Rech.f. & Riedl) Pimenov & Kljuykov
- Oreocome hindukushensis Pimenov & Kljuykov
- Oreocome involucellata Pimenov & Kljuykov
- Oreocome limprichtii (H.Wolff) Pimenov & Kljuykov
- Oreocome nuristanica Pimenov & Kljuykov
