= The Doctor's Wife (Ariyoshi novel) =

1966 novel by Sawako Ariyoshi

- Author: Sawako Ariyoshi
- Original title: Hanaoka Seishū no tsuma (華岡青洲の妻)
- Translator: Wakako Hironaka and Ann Siller Kostant
- Cover artist: Komaro Hoshino
- Language: Japanese (original)
- Publisher: Kodansha International
- Publication date: 1966
- Publication place: Japan
- English publication date: 1978
- Media type: Book
- Pages: 174
- ISBN: 4-7700-2974-8
- OCLC: 54488219
- Dewey Decimal: 895.6/35 22
- LC Class: PL845.R5 H313 2003

The Doctor's Wife, known in Japanese as Hanaoka Seishū's Wife (華岡青洲の妻, Hanaoka Seishū no tsuma), is a noted novel by Sawako Ariyoshi written in 1966.

The partly historical novel is based on the life of noted male physician Hanaoka Seishū. Though much is based on fact, many events were added for dramatic purposes.

== Plot ==
The novel follows the protagonist, here named Kae, from youth until death. From a young age, she is fascinated with Otsugi, the wife of Hanaoka Naomichi - Otsugi is said to be the most beautiful woman in the Kishu Province. Otsugi requests that Kae be married off to her son Seishū, and Kae's family eventually agrees. From there Kae learns that Otsugi is not the angelic beauty she outwardly displays and they both compete for the affections of Seishū, who is experimenting on animals to develop an anesthetic for surgery. After Otsugi dies, Kae begins to let go of her direct hatred for Otsugi and begins to live her life. She has a conversation with Koriku in which Koriku states that Kae has won the contest for Umpei's love.
