= Sawako Ariyoshi =

Japanese writer and novelist (1931–1984)

- 有吉佐和子 (ありよし さわこ）
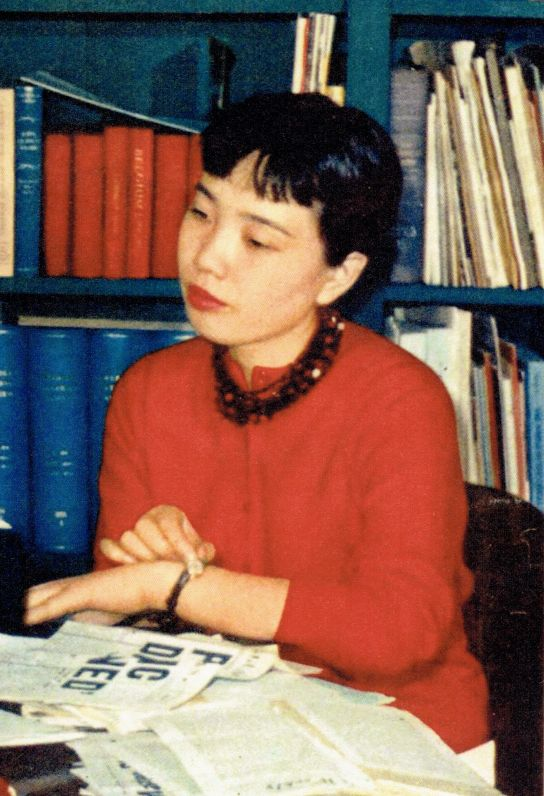
- Sawako Ariyoshi in Shufu to seikatsu, April 1960
- Born: January 20, 1931; Masagocho, Wakayama City
- Died: August 30, 1984 (aged 53); Suginami-ku, Tokyo
- Resting place: Kodaira Metropolitan Cemetery
- Education: Tokyo Woman's Christian University, Sarah Lawrence College
- Occupations: Novelist, Playwright, Director, Impresario
- Notable work: Earth (1956); The River Ki (1959); Sueemon 4th Generation（1963）; The Doctor's Wife (Ariyoshi novel) (1966）; The Twilight Years (1972）; Complex Pollution（1974-75）; Wamiya-sama (1977-78）
- Spouse: Jin Akira
- Children: Ariyoshi Tamao
- Awards: Novel Shincho Award (1963）; Women's Literature Prize (1967）; Bungei Spring Reader Award (1968）; Art Selection (1970）; Japanese Literature Grand Prix (1970）; Mainichi Arts Award (1979）

Sawako Ariyoshi (有吉 佐和子 Ariyoshi Sawako, 20 January 1931 – 30 August 1984) was a Japanese writer, known for such works as The Doctor's Wife and The River Ki. She was known for her advocacy of social issues, such as the elderly in Japanese society, and environmental issues. Several of her novels describe the relationships between mothers and their daughters. She also had a fascination with traditional Japanese arts, such as kabuki and bunraku. She also described racial discrimination in the United States, something she experienced firsthand during her time at Sarah Lawrence, and the depopulation of remote Japanese islands during the 1970s economic boom.

== Biography ==
=== Personal life ===
Sawako Ariyoshi was born on January 20, 1931, in Wakayama City, Japan, and spent part of her childhood in Indonesia. The family returned to Japan in 1941, and quickly moved from Tokyo to Wakayama to live with her grandmother to escape the bombings. After the war, the family returned to Tokyo, where she attended high school and later college at Tokyo Women's Christian University. She published several short stories in various journals while still in Japan. She also was nominated for the Bungakukai Prize for New Writers and the Akutagawa Prize, both for her work, Jiuta. She was also nominated for the Naoki Prize for Shiroi ōgi in 1957.

In 1959, Ariyoshi moved to the United States and spent a year studying at Sarah Lawrence College. After she left Sarah Lawrence, she worked for a publishing company, and continued publishing short stories and journal articles. Two of her works, Hishoku and Puerutoriko Nikki, are based on her experiences in New York. She also joined a dance troupe, and traveled extensively to get material for her novels, such as China Report. She was also the recipient of a Rockefeller Foundation Fellowship in 1959. Additionally, she received some Japanese literary awards, and even made an appearance on the popular Japanese TV show Waratte Iitomo!. She is credited as a writer for multiple Japanese TV shows and movies, including adaptations of her books. In 1962, she married Jin Akira and had a daughter. They divorced in 1964. She died of acute heart failure on August 30, 1984.

=== Writing ===
Ariyoshi was a prolific novelist and one of Japan's most famous female writers. Her works dramatize significant social issues, such as the suffering of the elderly, the effects of pollution on the environment, and the effects of social and political change on Japanese domestic life and values, and focus particularly on the lives of women. Her novel The Twilight Years depicts the life of a working woman who is caring for her elderly, dying father-in-law. Among Ariyoshi's other novels is The River Ki, an insightful portrait of the lives of three rural women: a mother, daughter, and granddaughter. One of the characters, Hana, is based on her own grandmother. Her 1966 novel The Doctor's Wife marked her as one of the finest postwar Japanese women writers, according to the Japan Times. The Doctor's Wife is a historical novel dramatizing the roles of nineteenth-century Japanese women, and chronicles the life of the wife of a pioneer Japanese doctor, Hanaoka Seishū. She was nominated for many awards, and won several, including the first Mademoiselle Reader's Award for Tsudaremai, the sixth Fujin Kōron Readers’ Award, and the twentieth Art Selection Minister of Education Award, both for Izumo no Okuni.

== Works ==
- Rakuyō no Fu – Verse of the Setting Sun (1954)
- Jiuta – Ballad (1956)
- Shiroi ōgi – The White Folding Fan (1957)
- Masshirokenoke – The White Ones (1957)
- Ningyō jōruri – Puppet Jōruri (1958)
- Homura Homura (1958)
- Kinokawa – The River Ki (1959)
- Kiyu no shi – The Death of Kiyu (1962)
- Kōge – Incense and Flowers (1962)
- Tsudaremai – Linked Dance (1962)
- Aritagawa – The River Arita (1963)
- Hishoku – Not Because of Color (1964)
- Puerutoriko nikki – Puerto Rico Diary (1964)
- Ichi no ito – One Thread (1964-5)
- Hanaoka Seishū no tsuma – The Doctor's Wife (1966)
- Hidakagawa – The River Hidaka (1966)
- Fushin no toki – The Time of Distrust (1967)
- Midaremai – Chaotic Dance (1967)
- Umikura – The Dark Ocean (1967-8)
- Izumo no Okuni – Kabuki Dancer (1969)
- Kōkotsu no hito – The Twilight Years (1972)
- Fukugō osen – The Complex Contamination (1975)
- Kazu no miyasama otome – Her Highness Princess Kazu (1978)
- Chūgoku repōto – China Report (1978)
- Nihon no shimajima, mukashi to ima – The Japanese Islands: Past and Present (1981)

== Film adaptations ==
- 1964: The Scent of Incense
- 1966: The Kii River
- 1967: The Wife of Seishu Hanaoka
- 1973: The Twilight Years

== See also ==
- Japanese literature
- List of Japanese authors
