= Hua Tuo =

Chinese physician (c. 140–208)

Hua Tuo 華佗
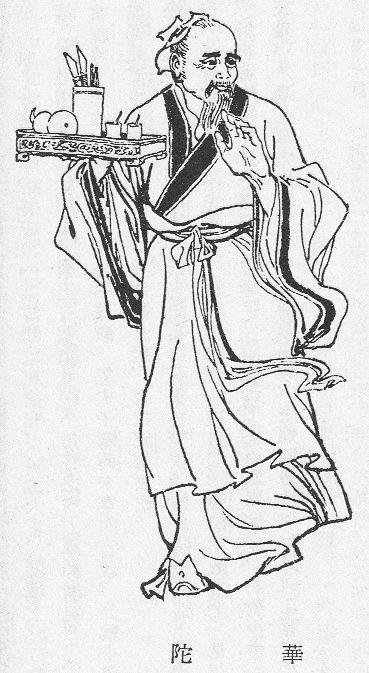
- A Qing dynasty illustration of Hua Tuo
- Born: c. 140; Bozhou, Anhui
- Died: 208 (aged 68)
- Other name: Yuanhua (元化)
- Occupation: Physician

Hua Tuo
- Traditional Chinese: 華佗
- Simplified Chinese: 华佗
Transcriptions
Standard Mandarin
- Hanyu Pinyin: Huà Tuó

Yuanhua
- Chinese: 元化
Transcriptions
Standard Mandarin
- Hanyu Pinyin: Yuánhuà

Hua Tuo (c. 140–208), courtesy name Yuanhua, was a Chinese physician who lived during the late Eastern Han dynasty. Historical texts, such as Records of the Three Kingdoms and Book of the Later Han record Hua Tuo as having been the first person in China to use anaesthesia during surgery. He used a general anaesthetic combining wine with a herbal concoction called mafeisan (麻沸散; literally "cannabis boil powder"). Besides being respected for his expertise in surgery and anaesthesia, Hua Tuo was famous for his abilities in acupuncture, moxibustion, herbal medicine and medical daoyin exercises. He developed the Wuqinxi (五禽戲; literally "Exercise of the Five Animals") from studying the movements of the tiger, deer, bear, ape and crane.

== Historical accounts ==
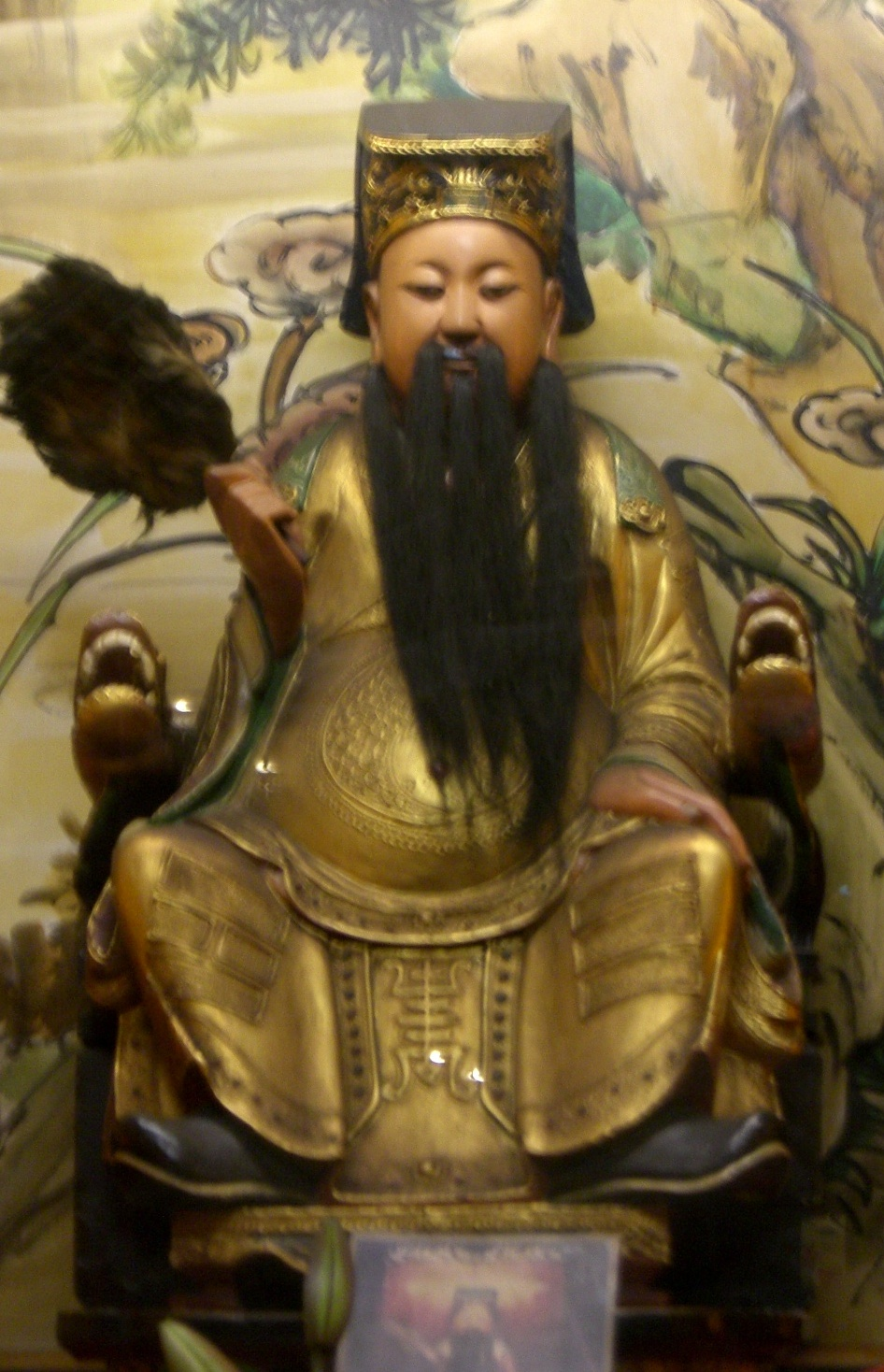
Statue of Hua Tuo at the Mengjia Longshan Temple in Taipei

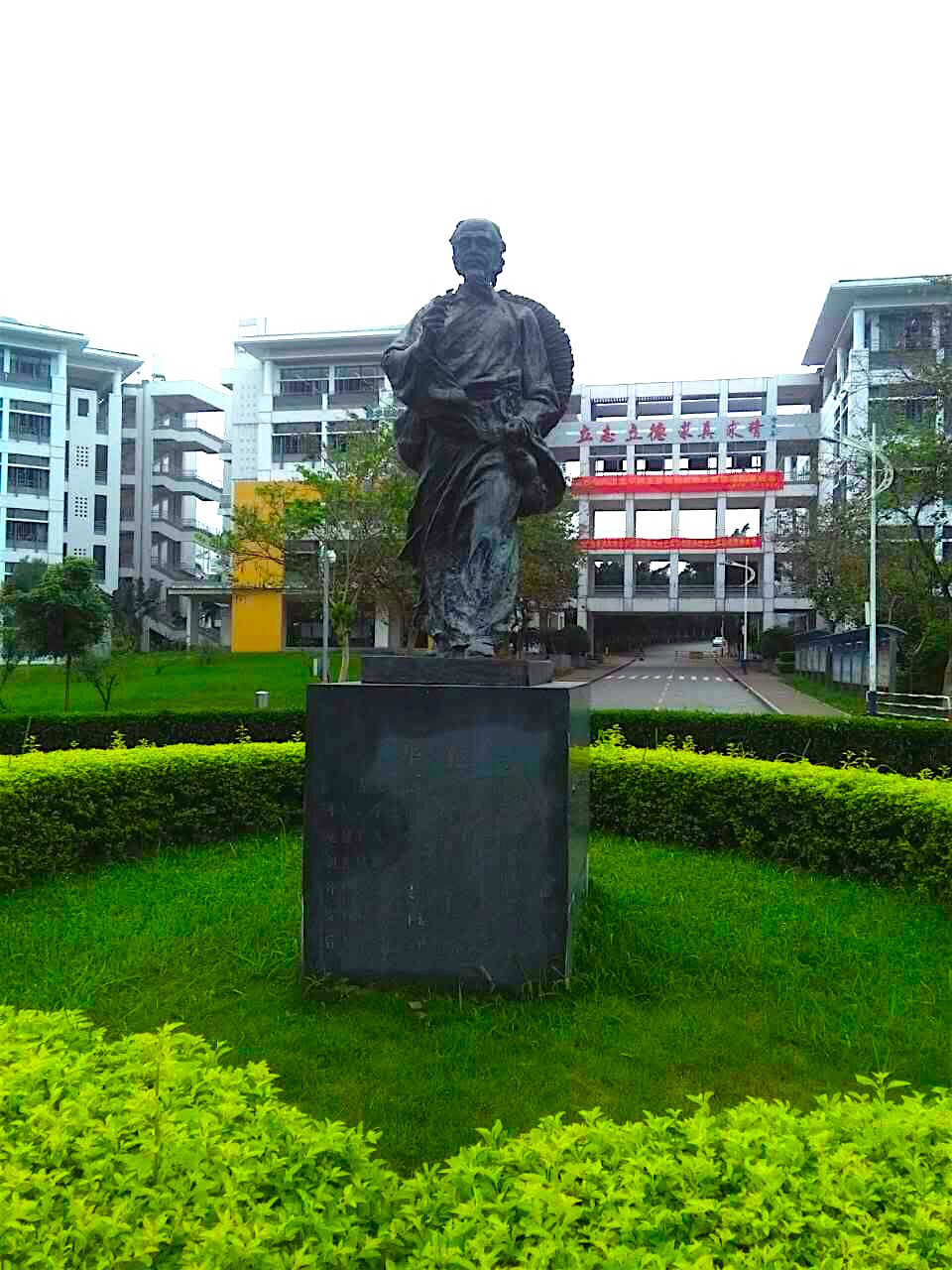
Statue of Hua Tuo at Guangdong Medical College in Dongguan

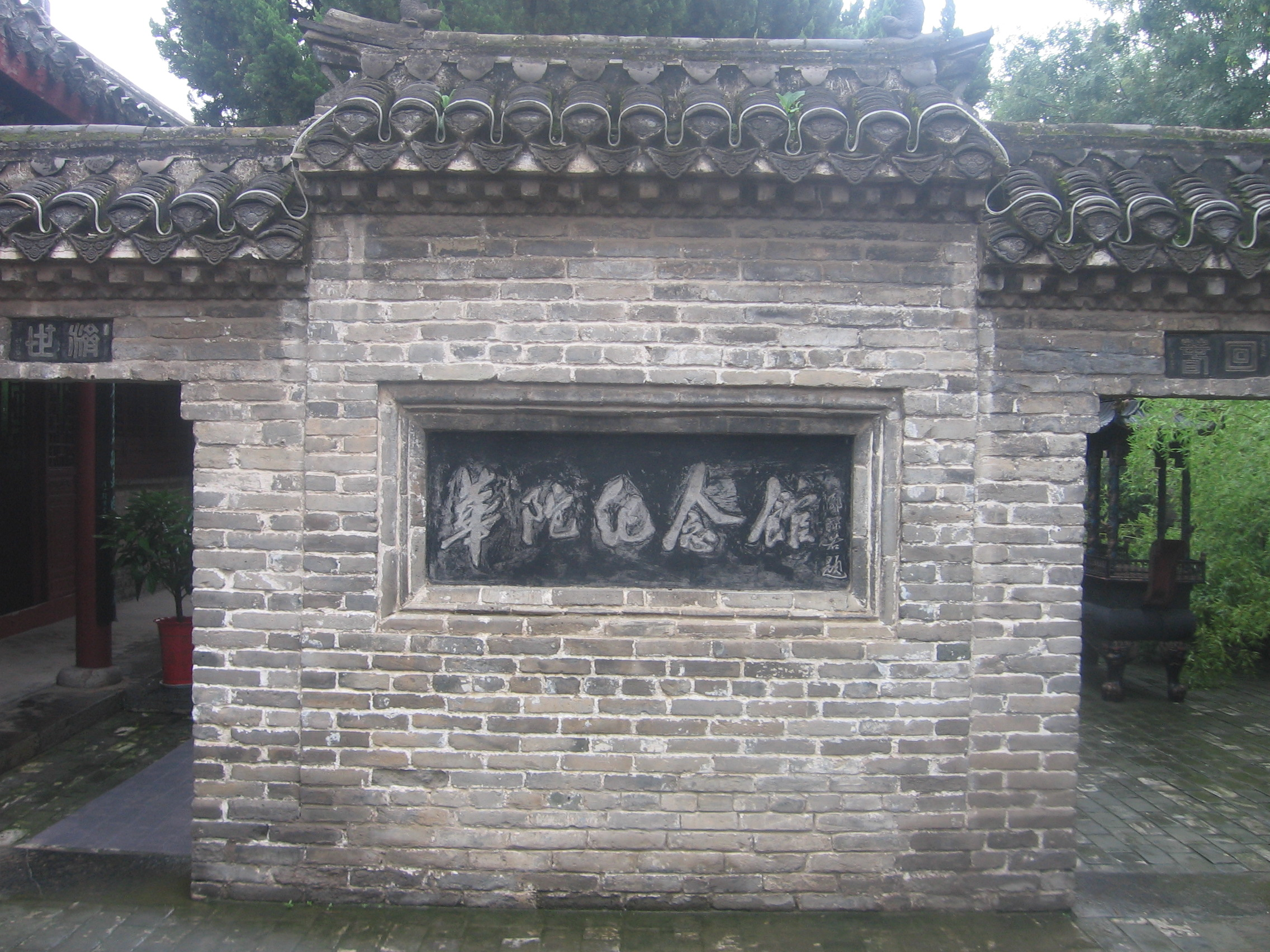
Hua Tuo Memorial Hall in Bozhou, Anhui

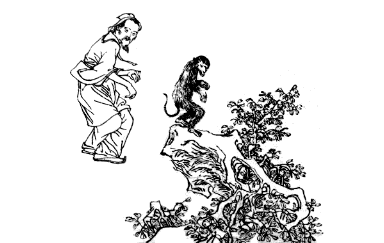
Hua Tuo studying monkey movements

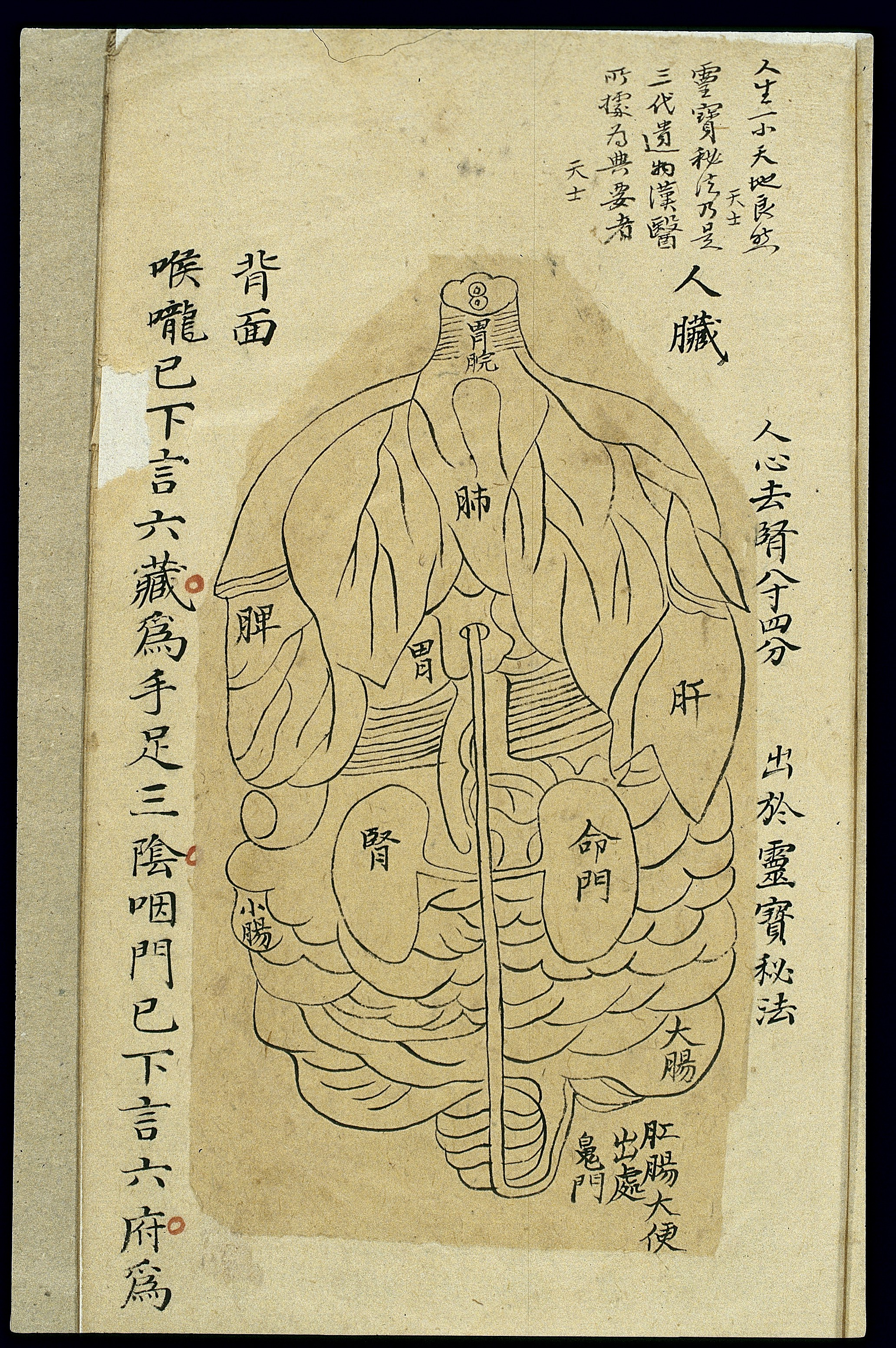
Yuanmen Maijue Neizhao Tu (元門脈訣內照圖), a chart of the internal viscera and organs. Attributed to Hua Tuo. Imprint of the Qing dynasty.

The oldest extant biographies of Hua Tuo are found in the official Chinese histories for the Eastern Han dynasty (25-220) and Three Kingdoms period (220–280) of China. The third-century historical text Records of Three Kingdoms (Sanguozhi) and the fifth-century historical text Book of the Later Han (Houhanshu) record that Hua Tuo was from Qiao County (譙縣), Pei Commandery (沛郡) (in present-day Bozhou, Anhui) and that he studied Chinese classics throughout the Xu Province (covering parts of present-day Jiangsu and Shandong provinces). He refused employment offers from high-ranking officials, such as Chen Gui, and chose to practise medicine.

The dates of Hua Tuo's life are uncertain. Estimations range from 110 to 207 CE, and from 190 to 265 CE. Lu and Needham conclude that the best estimate is circa 145–208. Hua Tuo was an older contemporary of the physician Zhang Zhongjing (150–219).

The name Hua Tuo combines the Chinese surname Hua (華, literally "magnificent; China") with the uncommon Chinese given name Tuo (佗 literally "hunchback" or 陀 literally "steep hill"). He was also known as Hua Fu (尃; literally "apply [powder/ointment/etc.]"), and his courtesy name was Yuanhua (元化; literally "primal transformation").

=== Medical techniques ===
Some scholars believe that he was responsible for the development of pressure points used in Chinese martial arts. Victor H. Mair describes him as "many hundreds of years ahead of his time in medical knowledge and practice".

Hua Tuo's biography in the Sanguozhi describes him as resembling a Daoist xian (仙; "immortal") and details his medical techniques.

[Hua Tuo] had mastered the technique for nourishing one's nature. Although his contemporaries thought that he must have been a hundred years old, he still looked hale and hardy. [Hua Tuo] was also highly skilled in prescribing medicines. In curing illnesses, the decoctions that he prepared required only a few ingredients. His mind was so adept at dividing up and compounding according to the right proportions that he did not have to weigh the different components of his medicines with a balance. Once the decoction was boiled thoroughly it could be drunk. [Hua Tuo] would tell the patient how to take the medicine and then would go away, after which the patient's condition would promptly improve.

If [Hua Tuo] employed moxibustion, he would only burn punk in one or two places and in each place he only made seven or eight separate cauterisations, to which the disease would rapidly respond during the course of its elimination. If he employed acupuncture, it was also only in one or two places. As he instated the needle, he would instruct the patient, "I am going to guide the point to such-and-such a spot. When you feel it reach there, tell me." As soon as the patient told him that the point had already reached the designated spot, he would withdraw the needle and the sickness would likewise be virtually alleviated.

If a sickness were concentrated internally where the effect of acupuncture needles and medicines could not reach it, [Hua Tuo] would recognise that it was necessary to operate. In such cases, he would have his patients drink a solution of morphean powder whereupon they would immediately become intoxicated as though dead and completely insensate. Then he could make an incision and remove the diseased tissues. If the disease were in the intestines, he would sever them and wash them out, after which he would stitch the abdomen together and rub on an ointment. After a period of about four or five days, there would be no more pain. The patient would gradually regain full consciousness and within a month he would return to normal.

Hua Tuo's biography in the Houhanshu explains this mafeisan "numbing boiling powder" decoction was dissolved in jiu (酒; literally "alcoholic beverage; wine"). His prescription for the mafeisan anaesthetic liquor was lost or destroyed, along with all of his writings. The Book of Sui lists five medical books attributed to Hua Tuo and his disciples, but none are extant.

=== Chen Deng ===
The subsequent portion of Hua Tuo's biography in the Sanguozhi lists 16 medical cases: ten internal medicine, three surgical, two gynaecological, and one paediatric case. Hua Tuo's treatment of diseases was centred on internal medicine, but also included surgery, gynaecology and paediatrics. He removed parasites, performed abortions and treated ulcers, sores and analgesia. For example:

The governor of [Guangling], Chen Deng, had an illness which caused him to be distressed by a feeling of stuffiness in his chest. He also had a red face and no desire for food. [Hua Tuo] took his pulse and said, "Your honour, there are several pints of parasitic bugs in your stomach and you are on the verge of developing an ulcer. This was caused by eating raw fish." Whereupon he prepared two pints of a decoction for the governor, [Hua Tuo] had him drink one pint first and then after a little while had him finish the remainder. In the space of time that it takes to eat a meal, the governor vomited up three pints or so of parasites. They had red heads and were all wriggling; half of their bodies looked like sashimi (raw fish slices). The discomfort that he had experienced was immediately relieved. "This sickness will erupt after three years. If you are attended by a good doctor, he will be able to save you." The sickness did indeed erupt after the specified period. At the time, [Hua Tuo] was not in the area and the governor died as [Hua Tuo] had said he would if he did not have a good doctor.

=== Cao Cao and execution ===
Cao Cao (155–220), a warlord who rose to power towards the end of the Han dynasty and laid the foundation for the Cao Wei state in the Three Kingdoms period, was probably Hua Tuo's best known patient. He suffered from chronic headaches, which were possibly caused by a brain tumour.

[Cao Cao] heard about [Hua Tuo] and summoned him to court where he henceforth was often in attendance. [Cao Cao] suffered from blustery headaches. Whenever an attack came on, he would become dizzy and confused. [Hua Tuo] would employ acupuncture treatment at the diaphragmatic transport insertion point and the condition would be alleviated as soon as the procedure was carried out.

Cao Cao's condition has also been translated as "migraine headaches accompanied by mental disturbance and dizziness" and the acupuncture point on the sole as identified as Yongquan (涌泉; "bubbling fountain"). Cao Cao ordered Hua Tuo to be his personal physician – a job Hua Tuo resented.

Examples of [Hua Tuo]'s superlative skills are in general of this sort. However, since he was originally a scholar, he often regretted that he was looked upon as a physician by profession. Later, when [Cao Cao] took personal control of the affairs of state, his sickness intensified and he had [Hua Tuo] attend him exclusively. "It will be difficult to heal you in the near term but if we maintain a programme of treatment over a longer period, it will be possible to extend your life-span."

In order to avoid treating Cao Cao, Hua Tuo repeatedly made excuses that his wife was ill, but Cao Cao discovered the deception and ordered Hua Tuo's execution. Xun Yu, one of Cao Cao's advisers, pleaded for mercy on behalf of the physician.

[Hua Tuo] had been far away from home for a long time and wished to return, so he said, "I just received a letter from home and would like to go back temporarily." After he reached home, excusing himself on the grounds of his wife's illness, he requested several extensions of his leave and did not come back. [Cao Cao] repeatedly wrote letters to [Hua Tuo] calling him back, and he issued imperial orders to the commandery and district authorities to send [Hua Tuo] back. Proud of his ability and finding it distasteful to wait upon others for a living, [Hua Tuo] continued to procrastinate in setting off on the journey. [Cao Cao] became very angry and dispatched men to go and investigate. If [Hua Tuo]'s wife were really sick, [Cao Cao] would present him with forty bushels of lentils and be lenient in setting a date when his leave would expire. But if [Hua Tuo] were prevaricating, then he would be apprehended and escorted back. Consequently, [Hua Tuo] was handed over to the prison at Hsü where after interrogation, he confessed his guilt. Interceding on behalf of [Hua Tuo], [Xun Yu] said, "[Hua Tuo]'s techniques are truly effective and people's lives are dependent upon them. It is fitting that you be clement towards him." "Don't worry," said [Cao Cao]. "Do you think there aren't any other rats like him under heaven?"

Hua Tuo wrote down his medical techniques while awaiting execution, but destroyed his Qing Nang Shu (青囊書; literally "green bag book", which became a Classical Chinese term for "medical practices text").

Whereupon the investigation against [Hua Tuo] was concluded with the announcement of the death penalty. When [Hua Tuo] was about to be executed, he brought out a scroll with writing on it and handed it over to the jailer, saying, "This can preserve people's lives." Fearful of the law, the prison subaltern would not accept it, nor did [Hua Tuo] force it upon him. Instead, he asked for a fire in which he burned the scroll.

This loss to traditional Chinese medicine was irreplaceable. Ilza Veith notes that, "Unfortunately, Hua T'o's works were destroyed; his surgical practices fell into disuse, with the exception of his method of castration, which continued to be practised. Due to the religious stigma attached to the practice of surgery, the social position accorded to the surgeon became increasingly lower and thus made a revival of Chinese surgery impossible."

A Liezi legend claims that the renowned physician Bian Que (c. 500 BCE) used anaesthesia to perform a double heart transplantation, but the fourth-century text was compiled after Hua Tuo used mafeisan.

Cao Cao later regretted executing Hua Tuo when his son Cao Chong (196–208), a child prodigy who may have independently discovered and used Archimedes' principle, died from illness.

After [Hua Tuo]'s death, [Cao Cao]'s blustery headaches did not go away. "[Hua Tuo] could have cured me," said [Cao Cao], "but the scoundrel prolonged my illness, wishing thereby to enhance his own position. Thus, even if I hadn't put the knave to death, he never would have eradicated the source of my sickness." Later on, when his beloved son [Cangshu (Cao Chong's courtesy name)] was critically ill, [Cao Cao] said with a sigh, "I regret having put [Hua Tuo] to death and causing my son to die in vain."

The Sanguozhi does not specify Hua Tuo's exact date of death, but since Cao Chong died in 208, Hua Tuo could not have lived past that year.

=== Disciples: Wu Pu and Fan A ===
Hua Tuo's biography ends with accounts of his disciples Wu Pu (吳普) and Fan A (樊阿).

[Wu Pu] of [Guangling] and [Fan A] of [Pengcheng] both studied with [Hua Tuo]. Using [Hua Tuo]'s methods of treatment, many people were completely cured by [Wu Pu]. "The human body needs exertion." [Hua Tuo] told [Wu Pu], "but it shouldn't be pushed to the limit. Movement of the limbs facilitates the absorption of nutrients in food and enables the blood in the arteries to flow freely, preventing sickness from occurring. It's like a door-pivot that never decays from bugs or worms because of the constant opening and closing. That's why, when the ancient transcendent practiced duction (guiding of the vital breath through the channels of the body), they strode like a bear and turned their head backward like an owl. They elongated their waist and limbs and moved all of their joints, seeking to stave off old age. I have a technique called 'the exercise of the five animals'. The first is the tiger, the second is the deer, the third is the bear, the fourth is the ape, the fifth is the bird. They may also be used to get rid of illness and are beneficial for the legs and feet because they are a type of duction. If there is discomfort somewhere in your body, get up and do one of my animal exercises until you're soaking with sweat, then sprinkle powder on yourself. Your body will feel relaxed and you'll have a good appetite."

Fan A was skilled at acupuncture and inserted the needles to extraordinary depths. Victor H. Mair notes this unusual name may indicate Fan A was a foreigner, and this area was around present-day Tongshan County, Jiangsu, the "location of the first known Buddhist community in China".

[Fan A] requested from [Hua Tuo] the recipe for an orally ingested medicine that would be beneficial to one's health, and [Hua Tuo] instructed him how to make a powder of varnish tree leaves and herbe de flacq. The proportions are fourteen ounces of shredded herbe de flacq for each pint of shredded varnish tree leaves. [Hua Tuo] said that if one takes a long course of this medicine, it will get rid of the three worms [types of parasites], benefit the five viscera, make the body feel nimble, and prevent your hair from turning white.

These herbs are qiye (漆叶; Toxicodendron vernicifluum leaves) and qingdian (青黏; Sigesbeckia orientalis).

=== Legacy ===
The Song dynasty Confucianist scholar Ye Mengde (1077–1148) criticised the Sanguozhi and Houhanshu biographies of Hua Tuo as being mythological. His essay, "Physicians Cannot Raise the Dead", repeated the descriptions of Hua Tuo using anaesthesia to perform internal surgery, and reasoned,

There is absolutely no principle whereby to account for this. That which makes a human being a human being is his physical form, and that which enlivens the physical form is the vital breath. I have no way of knowing whether [Hua Tuo]'s medicine could make a person intoxicated to the point of unconsciousness so that he could endure being cut open and could fully recuperate, causing the damaged portions to grow back together again. However, once the abdomen, back, intestines, or stomach have been cut open and dissected, how can they again be infused with vital breath? Being in such a condition, how could they be brought back to life again? If [Hua Tuo] could do this, then whoever was subjected to the punishment of dismemberment could be brought back to life again and there would no longer be any reason for carrying out royal punishments [involving physical mutilation].

In later times, a set of 34 paravertebral acupuncture points was named "Hua Tuo Jiaji" (華佗夹脊) in his honour. Hua Tuo is considered a shenyi (神醫, "divine physician") and is worshipped as a medicinal deity or immortal in some Chinese temples. "Hua Tuo zaishi" (華佗再世; "Hua Tuo reincarnated") is also an honourable term of respect that will be bestowed to a highly skilled physician.

== Fictional accounts ==
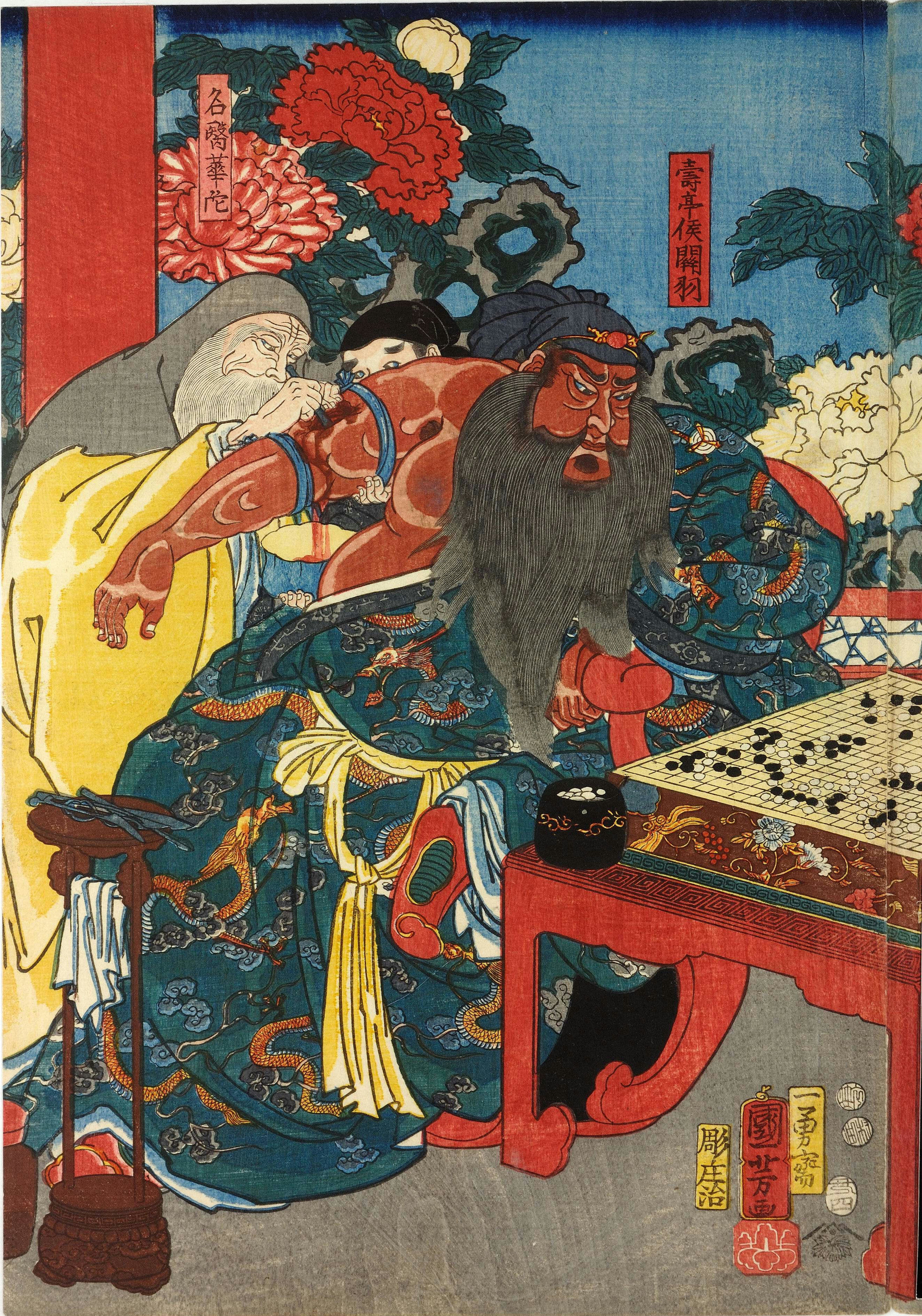
Woodblock by Utagawa Kuniyoshi depicting Hua Tuo operating on Guan Yu

In the 14th-century historical novel Romance of the Three Kingdoms, Hua Tuo heals the general Guan Yu, who was hit by a poisoned arrow in the arm during the Battle of Fancheng in 219. Hua Tuo offers to anaesthetise Guan Yu, but he simply laughs and says that he is not afraid of pain. Hua Tuo uses a knife to cut the flesh from Guan Yu's arm and scrape the poison from the bone, and the sounds strike fear into all those who hear them. During this excruciating treatment, Guan Yu continues to play a game of weiqi with Ma Liang without flinching from pain. When Ma Liang asks him later, Guan Yu says that he feigned being unhurt to keep the morale of his troops high. After Hua Tuo's successful operation, Guan Yu allegedly rewards him with a sumptuous banquet, and offers him a gift of 100 ounces of gold, but Hua Tuo refuses, saying that a physician's duty is to heal patients and not to make profit. Although Hua Tuo historically died in 208, a decade before Guan Yu fought at the Battle of Fancheng, this story of him performing surgery on Guan Yu has become a popular artistic theme.

The historical document Sanguozhi recorded that there was actually a bone surgery performed on Guan Yu, and that Guan Yu, indeed, showed no pained expression. Sanguozhi gave neither the name of the surgeon nor the exact time of the operation.

Hua Tuo is later summoned by Cao Cao to cure a chronic excruciating pain in his head, which turns out to be due to a brain tumour. Hua Tuo tells Cao Cao that in order to remove the tumor, it would be necessary to open up the brain by cutting open the head, getting the tumor out, and sewing it back, with Cao Cao completely anesthesized in the process. However, Cao Cao suspects that Hua Tuo is planning to murder him, so he has Hua Tuo arrested and imprisoned. (Cao Cao's suspicions are in part due to a previous attempt by Ji Ping, an imperial physician, to force him to consume poisoned medicine.)

In Romance of the Three Kingdoms, Hua Tuo passes his Qing Nang Shu to a prison guard so that his medical legacy will live on. He dies in prison later. The prison guard's wife burns the book for fear of being implicated, but the guard manages to salvage some pages, which are about how to emasculate hen and ducks; the other pages are lost forever.

== Mafeisan ==
Hua Tuo's innovative anaesthetic mafeisan (literally "cannabis boiling powder", considered to be the first anaesthetic in the world) and supposedly used on Hua Tuo's patients during surgery, is a long-standing mystery. The Records of the Three Kingdoms and the Book of the Later Han both credit him as having created this anaesthetic during the Eastern Han dynasty. However, no written record or ingredients of the original have been found, although estimations have been made by Chinese medical practitioners in later periods. There is controversy over the historical existence of mafeisan in Chinese literature.

The name mafeisan combines ma (麻; "cannabis; hemp; numbed"), fei (沸; "boiling; bubbling") and san (散; "break up; scatter; medicine in powder form"). Ma can mean "cannabis; hemp" and "numbed; tingling" (e.g. mazui 麻醉 "anesthetic; narcotic"), which is semantically "derived from the properties of the fruits and leaves, which were used as infusions for medicinal purposes".

Modern Standard Chinese mafei is reconstructed as Old Chinese *mrâipəts, Late Han Chinese maipus (during Hua Tuo's life), and Middle Chinese mapjwəi.

Many sinologists and scholars of traditional Chinese medicine have speculated about the anaesthetic components of mafei powder. Frederick P. Smith contends that Hua Tuo, "the Machaon of Chinese historical romance", used yabulu (押不蘆; "Mandragora officinarum") rather than huoma (火麻; "cannabis") and mantuolo (曼佗羅; "Datura stramonium", nota bene, Hua's given name "Tuo") "infused in wine, and drunk as a stupefying medicine".

Herbert Giles (1897:323) translates mafeisan as "hashish"; and his son Lionel Giles identifies "hemp-bubble-powder" as "something akin to hashish or bhang". Ilza Veith quotes the sinologist Erich Hauer's "opinion that ma-fei (麻沸) means opium". Victor H. Mair notes that mafei "appears to be a transcription of some Indo-European word related to "morphine"". Although Friedrich Sertürner first isolated morphine from opium in 1804, Mair suggests, "It is conceivable that some such name as morphine was already in use before as a designation for the anaesthetic properties of this opium derivative or some other naturally occurring substance." Wang Zhenguo and Chen Ping find consensus among "scientists of later generations" that mafei contained yangjinhua (洋金花; "Datura stramonium") and wutou (烏頭; "rhizome of Aconitum, Chinese monkshood") or caowu (草烏; "Aconitum kusnezofflin; Kusnezoff monkshood").

Lu Gwei-Djen and Joseph Needham suggest Hua Tuo may have discovered surgical analgesia by acupuncture, "quite apart from the stupefying potions for which he became so famous – if so he kept it to himself and his immediate disciples so that the secret did not survive".

== See also ==
- Dong Feng
- Hanaoka Seishū
- Huangfu Mi
- Lists of people of the Three Kingdoms
- Zhang Zhongjing
