= Ligusticum striatum =

Scientific classification
- Kingdom: Plantae
- Clade: Tracheophytes
- Clade: Angiosperms
- Clade: Eudicots
- Clade: Asterids
- Order: Apiales
- Family: Apiaceae
- Genus: Ligusticum
- Species: L. striatum

Binomial name
- Ligusticum striatum DC.

Synonyms
- Cortia striata (DC.) Leute; Laserpitium striatum Wall. nom. inval.; Ligusticum wallichii Franch.; Oreocome striata (DC.) Pimenov & Kljuykov; Selinum striatum (DC.) Benth. & Hook. f.; Selinum striatum Benth. ex C.B.Clarke

Species of flowering plant

Ligusticum striatum (syn. L. wallichii) is a flowering plant native to India, Kashmir, and Nepal in the carrot family best known for its use in traditional Chinese medicine where it is considered one of the 50 fundamental herbs.

Pimenov & Kljuykov (2001) moves this species to Oreocome. Oreocome striata is the name currently accepted by Plants of the World Online.
