= Fluroxene =

Chemical compound

Clinical data
- ATC code: None

Identifiers
- IUPAC name: (2,2,2-trifluoroethoxy)ethene
- CAS Number: 406-90-6
- PubChem CID: 9844
- ChemSpider: 9461
- UNII: FO7JHA3G03
- CompTox Dashboard (EPA): DTXSID5059957
- ECHA InfoCard: 100.006.344

Chemical and physical data
- Formula: C_{4}H_{5}F_{3}O
- Molar mass: 126.078 g·mol^{−1}
- 3D model (JSmol): Interactive image
- SMILES: C=COCC(F)(F)F
- InChI: InChI=1S/C4H5F3O/c1-2-8-3-4(5,6)7/h2H,1,3H2; Key:DLEGDLSLRSOURQ-UHFFFAOYSA-N

Fluroxene (INN, USAN; brand name Fluoromar), or 2,2,2-trifluoroethyl vinyl ether, is a volatile, inhalational anesthetic. It was synthesized in 1951, and was introduced for clinical use in 1954, but was voluntarily withdrawn from the market in 1974 due to its potential flammability and accumulating evidence that it could cause organ toxicity. In any case, prior to being discontinued, it had largely been superseded by halothane. Fluroxene is metabolized to 2,2,2-trifluoroethanol, a compound responsible for some of the toxicity seen with fluroxene use.

== See also ==
- Divinyl ether
- Thiomethoxyflurane
