= Fink effect =

Effect of anesthesia

The Fink effect, also known as diffusion anoxia, diffusion hypoxia, or the second gas effect, is a factor that influences the pO_{2} (partial pressure of oxygen) within the pulmonary alveoli. When water-soluble gases such as anesthetic agent N_{2}O (nitrous oxide) are breathed in large quantities they can be dissolved in body fluids rapidly. This leads to a temporary increase in both the concentrations and partial pressures of oxygen and carbon dioxide in the alveoli.

The effect is named after Bernard Raymond Fink (1914–2000), whose 1955 paper first explained it. When a patient is recovering from N_{2}O anaesthesia, large quantities of this gas cross from the blood into the alveoli (down its concentration gradient) and so for a short period of time, the O_{2} and CO_{2} in the alveoli are diluted by this gas. A sufficiently large decrease in the partial pressure of oxygen leads to hypoxia, especially if the patient hypoventilates (which allows more time for evolving nitrous to dilute alveolar oxygen each breath). Nonetheless, this effect only lasts a couple of minutes and hypoxia can be avoided by increasing the fractional inspired oxygen concentration when recovering from N_{2}O administration. It is for this reason that Entonox, a 50:50 gaseous mixture of nitrous oxide and oxygen, is suitable for use by para-medical staff such as ambulance officers: it provides sufficient nitrous oxide for pain relief with sufficient oxygen to avoid hypoxia.

== See also ==
- Concentration effect – Effect affecting the pulmonary alveolar gas concentration during anesthesia
- Inhalational anesthetic – Volatile or gaseous anesthetic compound delivered by inhalation
- Second gas effect – Effect occurring during general anesthesia
