= C4H4F6O =

The molecular formula C_{4}H_{4}F_{6}O may refer to:

- Flurothyl, a volatile liquid drug from the halogenated ether family
- Isoflurothyl, a fluorinated ether related to the inhalational convulsant flurothyl
