= Desflurane =

Inhalational anesthesia medication

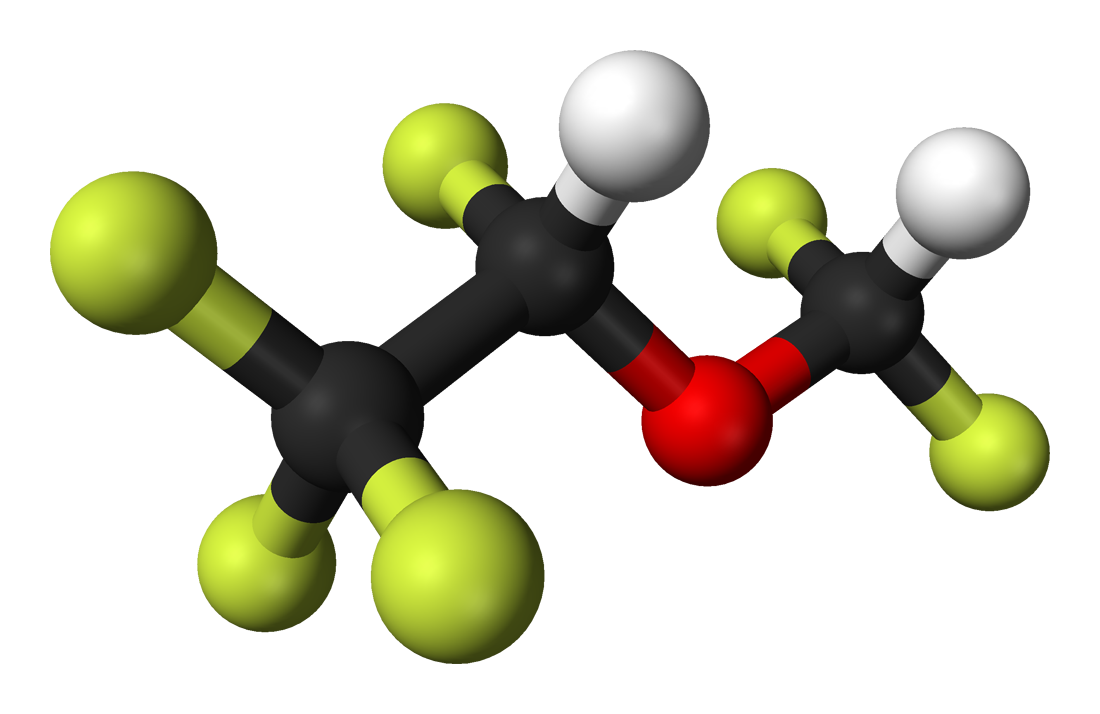

Clinical data
- Pronunciation: des-FLOO-rane
- Trade names: Suprane
- Other names: 1,2,2,2-tetrafluoroethyl difluoromethyl ether
- AHFS/Drugs.com: Micromedex Detailed Consumer Information
- License data: US DailyMed: Desflurane
- Pregnancy category: AU: B3
- Routes of administration: Inhalation
- ATC code: N01AB07 (WHO)

Legal status
- Legal status: AU: S4 (Prescription only); BR: Class C1 (Other controlled substances); US: ℞-only

Pharmacokinetic data
- Metabolism: Minimally metabolized
- Elimination half-life: Elimination dependent on minute ventilation

Identifiers
- IUPAC name: 2-(difluoromethoxy)-1,1,1,2-tetrafluoroethane
- CAS Number: 57041-67-5
- PubChem CID: 42113
- IUPHAR/BPS: 7156
- DrugBank: DB01189
- ChemSpider: 38403
- UNII: CRS35BZ94Q
- KEGG: D00546
- ChEBI: CHEBI:4445
- ChEMBL: ChEMBL1200733
- CompTox Dashboard (EPA): DTXSID80866606
- ECHA InfoCard: 100.214.382

Chemical and physical data
- Formula: C_{3}H_{2}F_{6}O
- Molar mass: 168.038 g·mol^{−1}
- 3D model (JSmol): Interactive image
- SMILES: FC(F)(F)C(F)OC(F)F
- InChI: InChI=1S/C3H2F6O/c4-1(3(7,8)9)10-2(5)6/h1-2H; Key:DPYMFVXJLLWWEU-UHFFFAOYSA-N

Desflurane, sold under the brand name Suprane, is a highly fluorinated methyl ethyl ether used for induction and maintenance of general anesthesia. It was developed in the 1980s and approved by the FDA in 1992 as a faster acting and clearing inhalant anesthetic compared to previously used inhalant anesthetics. Like halothane, enflurane, and isoflurane, it is a racemic mixture of (R) and (S) optical isomers (enantiomers). Additionally, it has the most rapid onset and offset of the volatile anesthetic drugs used for general anesthesia due to its low solubility in blood (since desflurane is both lipophobic and hydrophobic).

Some drawbacks of desflurane are its low potency, its pungency, and its high cost (though at low flow fresh gas rates, the cost difference between desflurane and isoflurane appears to be insignificant). It may cause tachycardia and airway irritability when administered at concentrations greater than 10% by volume. Due to this airway irritability, desflurane is infrequently used to induce anesthesia via inhalation techniques.

Though it vaporizes very readily, it is a liquid at room temperature. Desflurane has a high vapor pressure and a low boiling point, requiring a specific anesthetic vaporizer. Anaesthetic machines are fitted with a specialized anaesthetic vaporizer unit that heats liquid desflurane at a constant temperature and pressure. This enables the agent to be available at a constant vapor pressure and negating the effects of fluctuating ambient temperatures.

Desflurane, along with enflurane and to a lesser extent isoflurane, has been shown to react with the carbon dioxide absorbent in anesthesia circuits to produce detectable levels of carbon monoxide through degradation of the anesthetic agent. The CO_{2} absorbent Baralyme, when dried, is most culpable for the production of carbon monoxide from desflurane degradation, although it is also seen with soda lime absorbent as well. Dry conditions in the carbon dioxide absorbent are conducive to this phenomenon, such as those resulting from high fresh gas flows.

== Medical uses ==
Desflurane is a volatile inhalational anesthetic primarily used for the maintenance of general anesthesia in adults and for maintenance in pediatric patients after induction with other agents. Desflurane is administered alongside other anesthetics like midazolam and propofol, analgesics, as well as air and oxygen for balanced anesthesia. Unlike intravenous anesthetics, inhalation anesthetics allow for better and more rapid control over the concentration, therefore more control over the depth of anesthesia. In addition, elimination is more rapid, resulting in shorter spans of respiratory depression. Desflurane is favored for its very rapid onset and offset of action, enabling swift induction and particularly fast recovery, which is advantageous for outpatient and day-case surgeries, and in populations where rapid emergence is critical, such as the elderly and obese patients. Desflurane has a low blood solubility because it is hydrophobic and lipophobic, which is why it has a fast onset and elimination Additionally, its use has been explored in scenarios like cardiac surgery for potential myocardial protection and in cases of severe seizures in epileptic patients, but primary indications remain tied to its reliable profile for maintaining anesthesia with rapid, predictable recovery.

== Adverse effects ==
Most common side effect of inhalant anesthetics is postoperative nausea and vomiting (PONV). Desflurane is generally not recommended for inhalation induction, especially in children, due to its pungency and risk of airway irritation, especially in patients with asthma, and laryngospasm. Carbon monoxide toxicity can occur with desflurane as it is a large producer of carbon monoxide. Hepatotoxicity is very rare with few single case reports of severe acute liver injury. Desflurane can cause increased intracranial pressure. In pediatric patients, Desflurane is linked to increased rate of emergence delirium post operatively. Desflurane decreases blood pressure, but at high concentrations can increase blood pressure and cause tachychardia. As of September 2025, desflurane has been linked to rare cases of bradycardia, vocal cord deterioration, and disseminated intravascular coagulation.

== Contraindications ==
It is contraindicated for induction of general anesthesia in the non-intubated pediatric population due to the high risk of laryngospasm. It should not be used in patients with known or suspected susceptibility to malignant hyperthermia. It is also contraindicated in patients with elevated intracranial pressure.

== Pharmacology ==
As of 2005 the exact mechanism of the action of general anaesthetics has not been delineated. Inhalant anesthetics work on the central and peripheral nervous systems by blocking excitatory ion channels and enhancing the activity of inhibitory ion channels, and reducing pain signals by inhibiting of spinal cord dorsal horn neurons. Desflurane is known to act as a positive allosteric modulator of the inhibitory GABA_{A} and an agonist of the inhibitory glycine receptors. In addition, desflurane acts as an antagonist on excitatory glutamate receptors, as a negative allosteric modulator of the nicotinic acetylcholine receptor, as well as affecting other ligand-gated ion channels.

Desflurane induces a dose dependent reduction in blood pressure due to reduced systemic vascular resistance. However, rapid increases in desflurane may induce a transient sympathetic response secondary to catecholamine release. Even though it is highly pungent, it is still a bronchodilator. It reduces the ventilatory response to hypoxia and hypercapnia. Like sevoflurane, desflurane vasodilatory properties also cause it to increase intracranial pressure and cerebral blood flow. However, it reduces cerebral metabolic rate. It also promotes muscle relaxation and potentiate neuromuscular blockade at a greater level than sevoflurane.

Desflurane is administered as an inhalant, and is rapidly eliminated from the lungs. It is not associated with nephrotoxicity and is resistant to defluorination. It is carried by albumin in the human body and is minimally metabolized by cytochrome CYP2E1 in the liver, which produces a metabolite trifluoroacetic acid and is eliminated through the urine. Only 0.02% of the metabolite is recovered from urine, the remainder eliminated through the lungs.

Desflurane has a half life of 8.16 ± 3.15 minutes. It has a median volume of distribution of 612 mL/kg. It is produced and available as a 240ml solution. There is no available data on Cmax and Tmax for desflurane as it is continuously adjusted by an anesthesiologist in real time during procedures. Instead, inhalant anesthetics are often measured by their minimal alveolar concentrations, and desflurane's MAC is 6.0% for the 31 to 65 age group and 7.25% for the 18 to 30 age group. Desflurane has a blood-to-gas partition coefficient of 0.42, with a blood-to-gas coefficient of 0.47.

Emergence from desflurane after an hour long procedure is on average 6 minutes. Because desflurane has a short half life it is not considered to affect women who are pregnant or breastfeeding, however, there have been no well-controlled studies specifically on pregnant women.

== Chemistry ==
=== Stereochemistry ===
Desflurane medications are a racemate of two enantiomers.

Enantiomeres of desflurane
(R)-Enantiomer	(S)-Enantiomer

=== Physical properties ===
Boiling point :	23.5 °C or 74.3 °F	(at 1 atm)
Density :	1.465 g/cm^{3}	(at 20 °C)
Molecular Weight :	168 Daltons
Vapor pressure:	88.5 kPa	672 mmHg	(at 20 °C)
	107 kPa	804 mmHg	(at 24 °C)
Blood:Gas partition coefficient:	0.42
Oil:Gas partition coefficient :	19
MAC :	6 vol %

== Global-warming potential ==
As desflurane is a polyfluorinated ether, it is a greenhouse gas. The twenty-year global-warming potential, GWP(20), for desflurane is about 3700, meaning that one tonne of desflurane emitted is equivalent to 3700 tonnes of carbon dioxide in the atmosphere, much higher than sevoflurane or isoflurane. Sevoflurane and isoflurane are replacing desflurane globally as hospitals try to minimize their carbon footprint. It has been estimated that halogenated anaesthetic agents used by health systems covering 80% of global population in 2023 emitted about 2 million tonnes CO2eq, 70% stemming from desflurane. England, Scotland and parts of Canada have banned desflurane use (except in exceptional circumstances) due to its environmental impact. The European Union banned the use of desflurane within its jursdiction on 1 January 2026, unless strictly required for use.

However unlike nitrous oxide, which is also used as an anaesthetic and remains in the atmosphere for over a century, the atmospheric lifetime of desflurane at 14.1 years is similar to methane at 12.4 years. Some argue that GWP is not a suitable metric for such short lived climate pollutants, and that due to its negligible radiative forcing desflurane is not a significant part of greenhouse gas emissions from the healthcare sector.
