= C4H3F7O =

The molecular formula C_{4}H_{3}F_{7}O (molar mass: 200.055 g/mol, exact mass: 200.0072 u) may refer to:

- Sevoflurane
- Synthane
