= C3H2ClF5O =

The molecular formula C_{3}H_{2}ClF_{5}O (molar mass: 184.49 g/mol, exact mass: 183.9714 u) may refer to:

- Enflurane (2-chloro-1,1,2,-trifluoroethyl-difluoromethyl ether)
- Isoflurane
