= Premedication =

Using medication to prepare for medical therapy

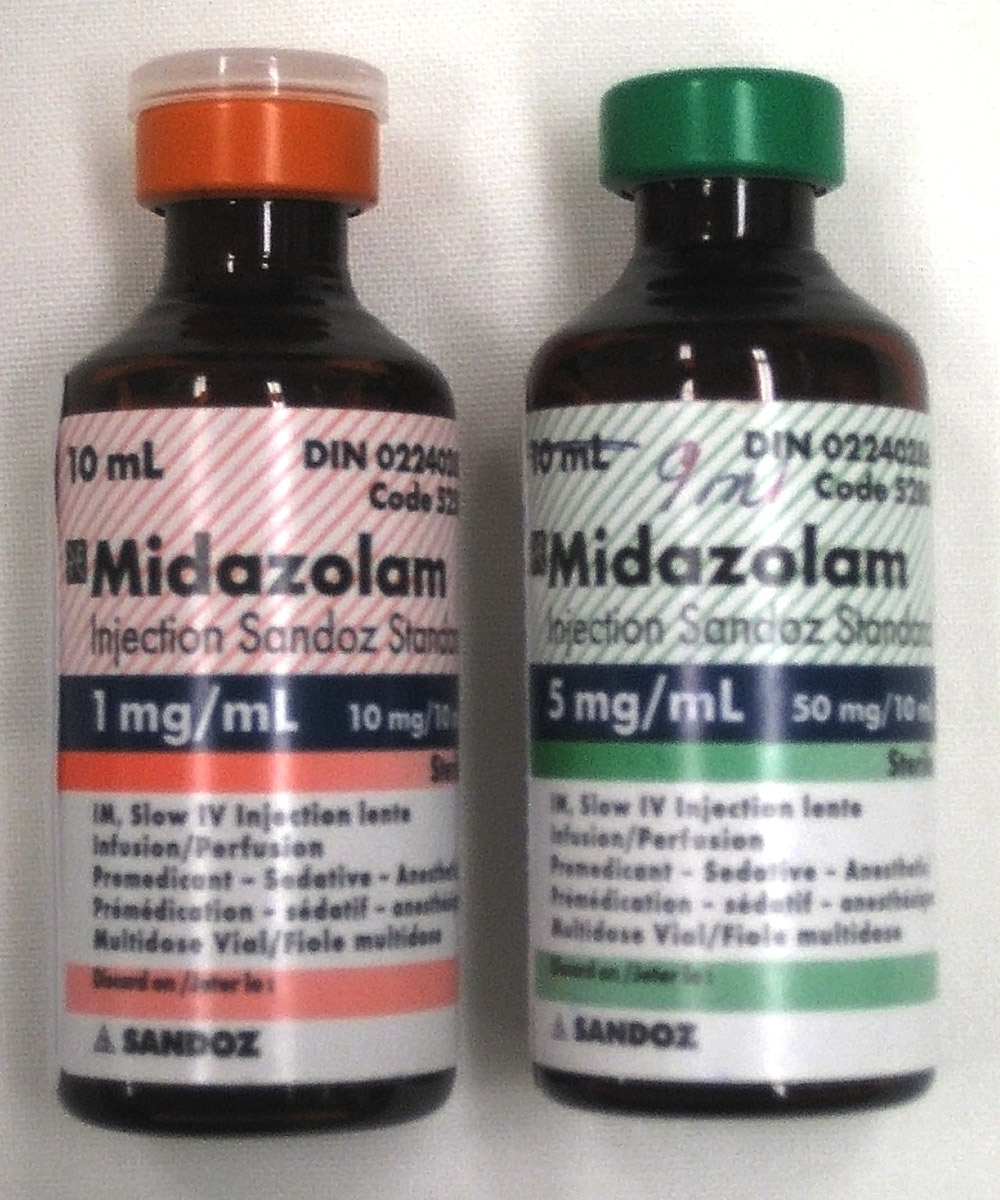
Midazolam is a premedication used for pre-surgical sedation

Premedication is using medication before some other therapy (usually surgery or chemotherapy) to prepare for that forthcoming therapy. Typical examples include premedicating with a sedative or analgesic before surgery; using prophylactic (preventive) antibiotics before surgery; and using antiemetics or antihistamines before chemotherapy.

Premedication before chemotherapy for cancer often consists of drug regimens (usually 2 or more drugs, e.g. dexamethasone, diphenhydramine and omeprazole) given to a patient minutes to hours before the chemotherapy to avert side effects or hypersensitivity reactions (i.e. allergic reactions).

Melatonin has been found to be effective as a premedication in both adults and children due to its pharmacological properties of hypnotic, antinociceptive and anticonvulsant which produce effective anxiolysis and sedation. Unlike midazolam, melatonin does not impair psychomotor skills or adversely affect the quality of recovery. It has a faster recovery time compared to midazolam and has a reduced incidence of post-operative excitement and results in a reduction in dose required of propofol and thiopental.

Midazolam is effective in children in reducing anxiety associated with separation from parents and induction of anesthesia. Sufentanil is also sometimes used as a premedication. Clonidine is becoming increasingly popular as a premedication for children. One drawback of clonidine is that it can take up to 45 minutes to take full effect. In children, clonidine has been found to be equal to and possibly superior to benzodiazepines as a premedication. It has a more favourable side effect profile. It also reduces the need for an induction agent. It improves post-operative pain relief, is better at inducing sedation at induction, reduces agitated emergence, reduces shivering and post-operative nausea and vomiting and reduces post-operative delirium associated with sevoflurane anaesthesia. Benzodiazepines such as midazolam are more commonly used due largely to a lack of a marketing effort by the pharmaceutical companies. As a result, clonidine is becoming increasingly popular with anesthesiologists. Dexmedetomidine and atypical antipsychotic agents are other premedications which are used particularly in very uncooperative children.

Non-drug interventions for children include playing relaxing music, massages, reducing noise and controlling light to maintain the sleep wake cycle. Other non-pharmacological options for children who refuse or cannot tolerate premedication include clown doctors; low sensory stimulation and hand-held video games may also help reduce anxiety during induction of general anesthesia.
