= Inhalational anesthetic =

Volatile or gaseous anesthetic compound delivered by inhalation

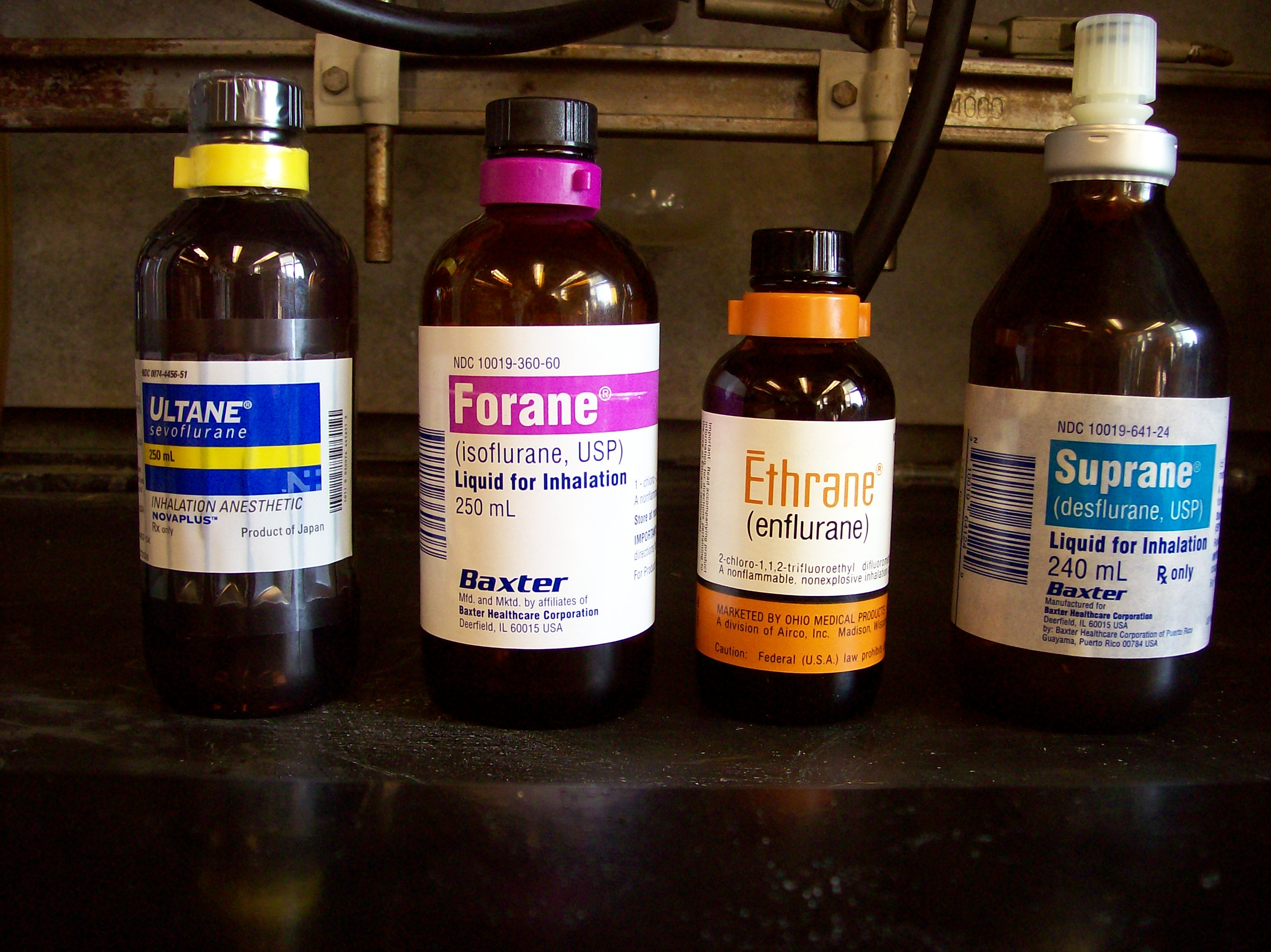
Bottles of sevoflurane, isoflurane, enflurane, and desflurane, the common fluorinated ether anesthetics used in clinical practice. These agents are color-coded for safety purposes. Note the special fitting for desflurane, which boils at room temperature.

An inhalational anesthetic is a chemical compound possessing general anesthetic properties that is delivered via inhalation. They are administered through a face mask, laryngeal mask airway or tracheal tube connected to an anesthetic vaporizer and an anesthetic delivery system. Agents of significant contemporary clinical interest include volatile anesthetic agents such as isoflurane, sevoflurane and desflurane, as well as certain anesthetic gases such as nitrous oxide and xenon.

== List of inhalational anesthetic agents ==
=== Currently-used agents ===
- Desflurane
- Isoflurane
- Nitrous oxide
- Sevoflurane
- Xenon

=== Previously-used agents ===
Although some of these are still used in clinical practice and in research, the following anesthetic agents are primarily of historical interest in developed countries:

- Acetylene
- Chloroethane (ethyl chloride)
- Chloroform
- Cyclopropane
- Diethyl ether
- Divinyl ether
- Enflurane
- Ethylene
- Fluroxene
- Halothane (still widely used in the developing world)
- Methoxyflurane (still used currently as an inhaled analgesic)
- Methoxypropane
- Trichloroethylene

=== Never-marketed / experimental agents ===
- Aliflurane
- Cryofluorane
- Halopropane
- Norflurane
- Roflurane
- Synthane
- Teflurane
- Vinyl chloride

== Volatile anesthetics ==
=== History ===
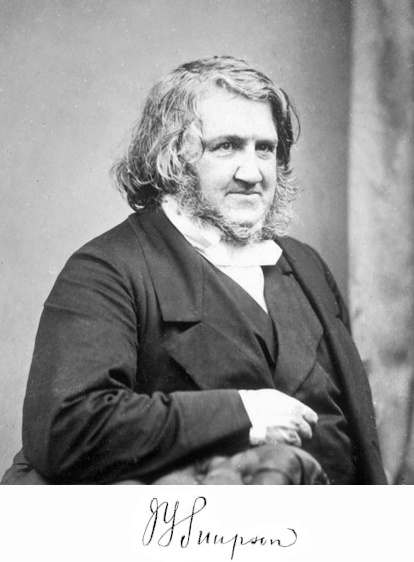
James Young Simpson

Before 1950, diethyl ether, which has severe risks of nausea, was used. Diethyl ether is extremely flammable, especially in the presence of enriched oxygen mixtures.

James Young Simpson, an obstetrics surgeon, used ethers to help women relieve their labor pains but later deemed them unsuitable. Simpson and his friends tested chloroform, at a dinner party. They woke from unconsciousness pleasantly surprised with its effectiveness. This was the first recorded successful use of halogenated hydrocarbons as anesthetics.

=== Modern era ===
Volatile anesthetic agents share the property of being liquid at room temperature, but evaporating easily for administration by inhalation. The volatile anesthetics used in the developed world today include: desflurane, isoflurane and sevoflurane. Other agents widely used in the past include ether, chloroform, enflurane, halothane, methoxyflurane. All of these agents share the property of being quite hydrophobic (i.e., as liquids, they are not freely miscible with water, and as gases they dissolve in oils better than in water).

=== Characteristics ===
The ideal volatile anesthetic agent offers induction and maintenance of general anesthesia with minimal effects on non-target organ systems. In addition it is suitable for use across a broad range of ages and in pregnancy; not metabolized; rapid in onset and offset; potent; safe for exposure to operating room staff; and has a long shelf life. It is also cheap to manufacture; easy to transport and store; easy to administer and monitor with standard operating room equipment; stable to light, plastics, metals, rubber, and soda lime; and non-flammable and environmentally safe. None of the agents currently in use are ideal, although many have some of the desirable characteristics. For example, sevoflurane is pleasant to inhale and is rapid in onset and offset. It is also safe for all ages. However, it is generally more expensive than isoflurane, although the difference varies by market and formulation, and approximately half as potent as isoflurane.

== Gases ==
Other gases or vapors which produce general anesthesia by inhalation include nitrous oxide, carbon dioxide, cyclopropane, and xenon. These are stored in gas cylinders and administered using flowmeters, rather than vaporizers. Cyclopropane is no longer used because of its flammability; otherwise it is an excellent anesthetic. Xenon is odorless and rapid in onset, but it is expensive and requires specialized equipment to administer. Nitrous oxide, even at 80% concentration, does not quite produce surgical level anesthesia in most people at standard atmospheric pressure, so it must be used as an adjunct anesthetic, alongside other agents.

== Hyperbaric anesthesia ==
Under hyperbaric conditions (pressures above normal atmospheric pressure), other gases such as nitrogen, and noble gases such as argon, krypton, and xenon become anesthetics. When inhaled at high partial pressures (more than about 4 bar, encountered at depths below about 30 meters in scuba diving), nitrogen begins to act as an anesthetic agent, causing nitrogen narcosis. However, the minimum alveolar concentration for nitrogen is not achieved until pressures of about 20 to 30 atm (bar) are attained. Argon is slightly more than twice as anesthetic as nitrogen per unit of partial pressure (see argox). Xenon however is a usable anesthetic at 80% concentration and normal atmospheric pressure.

== Endogenous analogs ==
Endogenous analogs of inhaled anesthetics are compounds that the body produces and that have the properties and similar mode of action of inhaled anesthetics. Among the gases in the human body, carbon dioxide is among the most abundant and produces anesthesia from insects to humans. CO_{2} anesthesia was first demonstrated to the king of France in the early 1800s by Henry Hill Hickman. Initially CO_{2} was thought to work through anoxia, but in the early 1900, increased CO_{2} in the lung showed a dramatic increase oxygenation of the brain disproving the anoxia argument. Prior to the development of modern anesthetics, CO_{2} was used extensively by psychiatrists in a treatment called carbon dioxide inhalation therapy.

== Neurological theories of action ==
The mechanism of action of volatile anesthetic agents has been intensely debated. "Anesthetics have been used for 160 years, and how they work is one of the great mysteries of neuroscience," says anesthesiologist James Sonner of the University of California, San Francisco. Anesthesia research "has been for a long time a science of untestable hypotheses," notes Neil L. Harrison of Cornell University.

"Most of the injectable anesthetics appear to act on a single molecular target," says Sonner. "It looks like inhaled anesthetics act on multiple molecular targets. That makes it a more difficult problem to pick apart."

The possibility of anesthesia by the inert gas argon in particular (even at 10 to 15 bar) suggests that the mechanism of action of volatile anesthetics is an effect best described by physical chemistry, and not a chemical bonding action. However, the agent may bind to a receptor with a weak interaction. A physical interaction such as swelling of nerve cell membranes from gas solution in the lipid bilayer may be operative. Notably, the gases hydrogen, helium, and neon have not been found to have anesthetic properties at any pressure. Helium at high pressures produces nervous irritation ("anti-anesthesia"), suggesting that the anesthetic mechanisms may be operated in reverse by this gas (i.e., nerve membrane compression). Also, some halogenated ethers (such as flurothyl) also possess this "anti-anesthetic" effect, providing further evidence for this theory.

== History ==
The first publicly demonstrated anesthetic of the modern era was diethyl ether, an inhalational anesthetic agent. Although its anesthetic properties were not widely recognized until the 19th century, the compound itself had been known for centuries. The 8th-century Arab philosopher Jabir ibn Hayyan may have been the first to compound ether. Ramon Llull, 13th-century European alchemist may also have created the compound independently. The 10th-century Persian physician Rhazes was the first physician to use general inhalation anesthesia in surgery.

Paracelsus developed an inhalational anesthetic in 1540. He used sweet oil of vitriol (prepared by Valerius Cordus and named Aether by Frobenius) to feed fowl: "it was taken even by chickens and they fall asleep from it for a while but awaken later without harm". Subsequently, about 40 years later, in 1581, Giambattista Delia Porta demonstrated the use of ether on humans although it was not employed for any type of surgical anesthesia.

In modern medicine, Dr. Horace Wells used nitrous oxide for his own dental extraction in 1844. However his attempt to replicate these results at Massachusetts General Hospital (MGH) resulted in a partial anesthetic and was deemed a failure.

William T.G. Morton is credited with successfully demonstrating surgical anesthesia for the first time on October 16, 1846, at MGH. Following this event, the use of ether and other volatile anesthetics became widespread in Western medicine.

After the experiments and publications by the Scottish obstetrician James Young Simpson in late 1847, chloroform became the first widespread halocarbon anesthetic. Chloroform is a much stronger and effective anesthetic than ether; it is non-flammable and it does not irritate the airways, unlike ether.

== See also ==
- A.C.E. mixture – a mixture of ethanol, chloroform and diethyl ether
- Anesthetic
- Concentration effect
- Second gas effect
