= Flurothyl =

Chemical compound

Clinical data
- Trade names: Indoklon
- Other names: Hexafluorodiethyl ether
- ATC code: None

Identifiers
- IUPAC name: 2,2-Oxybis(1,1,1-trifluoroethane) or Bis(2,2,2-trifluoroethyl) ether
- CAS Number: 333-36-8
- PubChem CID: 9528
- DrugBank: DB08969
- ChemSpider: 9155
- UNII: 9Z467FG2YK
- CompTox Dashboard (EPA): DTXSID5046516
- ECHA InfoCard: 100.155.160

Chemical and physical data
- Formula: C_{4}H_{4}F_{6}O
- Molar mass: 182.065 g·mol^{−1}
- 3D model (JSmol): Interactive image
- Density: 1.404 g/cm^{3}
- Boiling point: 62 to 63 °C (144 to 145 °F)
- SMILES: C(C(F)(F)F)OCC(F)(F)F
- InChI: InChI=1S/C4H4F6O/c5-3(6,7)1-11-2-4(8,9)10/h1-2H2; Key:KGPPDNUWZNWPSI-UHFFFAOYSA-N

Flurothyl (formerly under the trade name Indoklon) (IUPAC names: 1,1,1-trifluoro-2-(2,2,2-trifluoroethoxy)ethane or bis(2,2,2-trifluoroethyl) ether) is a volatile liquid drug from the halogenated ether family, related to inhaled anaesthetic agents such as diethyl ether and sevoflurane, but having the opposite effects, acting as a stimulant and convulsant. A clear and stable liquid, it has a mild ethereal odor whose vapors are non-flammable. It is excreted from the body by the lungs in an unchanged state.

Several compounds related to the halogenated ether anesthetics have similar convulsant effects rather than producing sedation, and this has been helpful in studying the mechanism of action of these drugs.

Currently, the main uses of flurothyl is in scientific research for inducing seizures in laboratory animals. It is also sometimes used as an additive with the name of BTFE in lithium-ion batteries.

== Research into psychiatric treatment ==
Flurothyl was at one time used in psychiatric medicine for shock therapy, in a similar manner to other convulsant drugs such as pentetrazol, as an alternative to electroconvulsive therapy (ECT). This use has now been discontinued.

In 1957, the Maryland pharmacologist J. C. Krantz experimented with flurothyl to induce seizures in psychiatric patients as an alternative to ECT. Flurothyl was injected into a plastic container in a tight fitting face mask. The patient inhaled a mixture of vapor and air, and expired air was forced into a charcoal adsorbent via a one-way valve. Oxygen was administered simultaneously. Flurothyl inhalations were first conducted without sedation or muscle paralysis. Premedication with pentothal and succinylcholine chloride, as is customary in ECT, was tested and found safe.

Four random assignment treatment studies found the clinical results for flurothyl to be as effective as those of ECT. Flurothyl treatments were administered on the same schedules as ECT. In some patients who had not responded to ECT, flurothyl treatment produced improvement.

The flurothyl treated patients showed less amnesia and confusion during the course of treatment with better patient acceptance. A detailed study comparing flurothyl and ECT in patients with severe endogenous depression, reported the degree of anterograde amnesia to be similar, but the degree of retrograde amnesia was much lower after flurothyl. Psychological tests showed memory impairments at the fourth week of treatment, and memory improvement two weeks after the last treatment, with no measurable differences between the treatments.

Equal degrees of EEG slow wave increases were recorded in flurothyl and electrical induced seizures. Oximetric and ECG studies showed comparable heart rate increases with occasional rhythmic irregularities.

Flurothyl induced seizures were deemed clinically equal to electrical seizures with lesser effects on cognition and memory. An editorial in the Journal of the American Medical Association in 1966 encouraged its use.

An injectable form of flurothyl was formulated. The clinical results were the same as with inhaled flurothyl.

== Mechanism of action ==
The convulsant properties of flurothyl pose a challenge to unifying theories of general anesthetics such as the Meyer-Overton hypothesis (see Theories of general anaesthetic action). A variety of halogenated ethers (e.g., isoflurane, sevoflurane) and diethyl ether itself are general anesthetics, and flurothyl is a substituted diethyl ether. Even more strikingly, a structural isomer of flurothyl known as isoflurothyl (1,1,1,3,3,3-hexafluoro-2-methoxypropane) induces general anesthesia and not convulsions in mice and dogs. Isoflurothyl differs from the widely used inhalational anesthetic sevoflurane by only a single fluorine atom (sevoflurane has an additional fluorine on the methyl group).

A molecular explanation for the difference between flurothyl and isoflurothyl was provided by electrophysiology studies that showed flurothyl was an antagonist (blocker) of neuronal GABA_{A} receptors and had no effect on neuronal glycine receptors. This receptor selectivity resembles that of the well-characterized GABA_{A} receptor antagonist picrotoxin. Studies using recombinant GABA_{A} and glycine receptors confirmed this activity profile and further showed that isoflurothyl behaved similar to other ether anesthetics in acting as a positive allosteric modulator of GABA_{A} and glycine receptors. There is some evidence that flurothyl may actually possess general anesthetic properties at high concentrations that are masked by the more potent convulsant action.

== See also ==
- Theories of general anaesthetic action
