= Blood–gas partition coefficient =

Measure of solubility of general anaesthetics in blood

Blood–gas partition coefficient, also known as Ostwald coefficient for blood–gas, is a term used in pharmacology to describe the solubility of inhaled general anesthetics in blood. According to Henry's law, the ratio of the concentration in blood to the concentration in gas that is in contact with that blood, when the partial pressure in both compartments is equal, is nearly constant at sufficiently low concentrations. The partition coefficient is defined as this ratio and, therefore, has no units. The concentration of the anesthetic in blood includes the portion that is undissolved in plasma and the portion that is dissolved (bound to plasma proteins). The more soluble the inhaled anesthetic is in blood compared to in air, the more it binds to plasma proteins in the blood and the higher the blood–gas partition coefficient.

It is inversely related to induction rate. Induction rate is defined as the speed at which an agent produces anesthesia. The higher the blood:gas partition coefficient, the slower the rate of induction.

Newer anesthetics (such as desflurane) typically have smaller blood–gas partition coefficients than older ones (such as ether); this leads to faster onset of anesthesia and faster emergence from anesthesia once application of the anesthetic is stopped, which may be preferable in certain clinical scenarios. If an anesthetic has a high coefficient, then a large amount of it will have to be taken up in the body's blood before being passed on to the fatty (lipid) tissues of the brain where it can exert its effect.

The potency of an anesthetic is associated with its lipid solubility, which is measured by its oil/gas partition coefficient.

Minimum alveolar concentration (MAC) is defined as the alveolar concentration of anesthetic gas that prevents a movement response in half of subjects undergoing a painful (surgical) stimulus; simplified, it is the exhaled gas concentration required to produce anaesthetic effects – an inverse indicator of anesthetic gas potency.

== Inhalational anaesthetics ==
Partition coefficients at 37 °C
| Anesthetic | MAC (%) | Blood/gas | Oil/gas | Brain/blood | Muscle/blood | Fat/blood |
|---|---|---|---|---|---|---|
| Nitrous oxide | 105 | 0.47 | 1.4 | 1.1 | 1.2 | 2.3 |
| Halothane | 0.74 | 2.4 | 224 | 2.9 | 3.5 | 60 |
| Isoflurane | 1.15 | 1.4 | 97 | 2.6 | 4.0 | 45 |
| Sevoflurane | 2 | 0.65 | 42 | 1.7 | 3.1 | 48 |
| Desflurane | 5.8 | 0.45 | 18.7 | 1.3 | 2.0 | 27 |
| Methoxyflurane | 0.2 | 12 | | | | |
| Enflurane | 1.58 | 1.9 | | | | |
