= Second gas effect =

Effect occurring during general anesthesia

During induction of general anesthesia, when a large volume of a gas (e.g. nitrous oxide) is taken up from alveoli into pulmonary capillary blood, the concentration of gases remaining in the alveoli is increased. This results in effects known as the second gas effect and the "concentration effect". These effects occur because of the contraction of alveolar volume associated with the uptake of the nitrous oxide. Previous explanations by Edmond I. Eger and Robert K. Stoelting have appealed to an extra-inspired tidal volume due to a potential negative intrapulmonary pressure associated with the uptake of the nitrous oxide.

There are two extreme breathing patterns and the extra-inspired tidal volume is an artificial construct associated with one of these patterns. Thus it is the volume change that actually causes the effects.

== Examples ==
An applicable example from Stedman's medical dictionary is when a constant concentration of an anesthetic such as halothane is inspired, the increase in alveolar concentration is accelerated by concomitant administration of nitrous oxide, because alveolar uptake of the latter creates a potential subatmospheric intrapulmonary pressure that leads to increased tracheal inflow.

== See also ==
- Concentration effect
- Fink effect
- Inhalational anesthetic
