= Minimum alveolar concentration =

Measurement of the potency of anaesthetic gasses

Minimum alveolar concentration (MAC) is the concentration, often expressed as a percentage by volume, of a vapour in the alveoli of the lungs that is needed to prevent movement in 50% of patients in response to pain. MAC is used to compare the potency (dose required to induce a specific effect) of anaesthetic vapours. The concept of MAC was first introduced in 1965.

"Minimum alveolar concentration" is a misnomer, as MAC is representative of a median value. The original paper proposed MAC as the minimal alveolar concentration, which was shortly thereafter revised to minimum alveolar concentration. A lower MAC value represents a more potent volatile anesthetic.

Other uses of MAC include MAC-BAR (1.7–2.0 MAC), which is the concentration required to block autonomic reflexes to nociceptive stimuli, and MAC-awake (0.3–0.5 MAC), the concentration required to block voluntary reflexes and control perceptive awareness.

== Formal definition ==
The MAC is the concentration of the vapour (measured as a percentage at 1 atmosphere, i.e. the partial pressure) that prevents patient movement in response to a supramaximal stimulus (traditionally a set depth and width of skin incisions) in 50% of subjects. This measurement is done at steady state (assuming a constant alveolar concentration for 15 minutes), under the assumption that this allows for an equilibration between the gasses in the alveoli, the blood and the brain. MAC is accepted as a valid measure of potency of inhalational general anaesthetics because it remains fairly constant for a given species even under varying conditions.

== Meyer-Overton hypothesis ==
The MAC of a volatile substance is inversely proportional to its lipid solubility (oil:gas coefficient), in most cases. This is the Meyer-Overton hypothesis put forward in 1899–1901 by Hans Horst Meyer and Charles Ernest Overton. MAC is inversely related to potency, i.e. a higher MAC equals a lower potency, as a greater concentration of the anaesthetic is required to suppress movement.

The hypothesis correlates lipid solubility of an anaesthetic agent with potency (1/MAC) and suggests that onset of anaesthesia occurs when sufficient molecules of the anaesthetic agent have dissolved in the cell's lipid membranes, resulting in anaesthesia. Exceptions to the Meyer-Overton hypothesis can result from:

- convulsant property of an agent
- specific receptor (various agents may exhibit an additional effect through specific receptors)
- co-administration of α_{2} agonists (such as dexmedetomidine) or opioid receptor agonists (morphine/fentanyl) can decrease the MAC
- Mullin's critical volume hypothesis
- Positive modulation of GABA at GABA_{A} receptors by barbiturates or benzodiazepines

== Factors affecting MAC ==
Certain physiological and pathological states may alter MAC. For example, MAC increases with hyperthermia and hypernatremia. Conversely, anemia, hypercarbia, hypoxia, hypothermia, hypotension (MAP less than 40mmHg), and pregnancy seem to decrease MAC. Duration of anesthesia and biological sex seem to have little effect on MAC.

Age has been shown to affect MAC. MAC begins to rise at one month of age with a peak at approximately 6 months of age (i.e., greater anaesthetic concentration is required to reach the effective anaesthetic dose). There is a subsequent steady decline in MAC with increasing age, with the exception of another peak during puberty. There is a linear model that describes the change in MAC of approximately 6% per decade of age.

Medications, illicit drugs, and prior substance use history have also been found to affect MAC. For example, acute use of amphetamines, cocaine, ephedrine, and chronic use of alcohol increase MAC. Whereas, administration of propofol, etomidate, barbiturates, benzodiazepines, ketamine, opiates, local anesthetics, lithium, verapamil, and alpha 2-agonists (dexmedetomidine, clonidine) decrease MAC. Acute alcohol intoxication and chronic amphetamine use have also been found to decrease MAC.

MAC values are additive. For instance, when applying 0.3 MAC of drug X and 1 MAC of drug Y the total MAC achieved is 1.3 MAC. In this way nitrous oxide is often used as a "carrier" gas to decrease the anesthetic requirement of other drugs.

== Common MAC values ==
Values are known to decrease with age and the following are given based on a 40-year-old (MAC_{40}):

- Nitrous oxide – 104 (Note: Nitrous oxide (N_{2}O) is the least potent inhaled anaesthetic agent. With a MAC of over 100, less than 50% of patients would theoretically become anaesthetised if receiving the maximum possible 100% nitrous oxide. While a minority of patients would be anaesthetised at 100% nitrous oxide, the resultant lack of oxygen would be fatal. For this reason, nitrous oxide can be used in practice for pain control, but not as the sole anaesthetic agent.)
- Xenon – 72
- Desflurane – 6.6
- Ethyl ether – 3.2
- Sevoflurane – 1.8
- Enflurane – 1.63
- Isoflurane – 1.17
- Halothane – 0.75
- Chloroform – 0.5
- Methoxyflurane – 0.16
