= C3H8O =

The molecular formula C_{3}H_{8}O may refer to:

- Methoxyethane (Ethyl methyl ether), CH_{3}-O-CH_{2}-CH_{3}, CAS number 540-67-0
- Propanols
  - Isopropyl alcohol (isopropanol, 2-propanol), CH_{3}-CHOH-CH_{3}, CAS number 67-63-0
  - 1-Propanol (n-propanol, n-propyl alcohol), CH_{3}-CH_{2}-CH_{2}OH, CAS number 71-23-8
