= POCD =

POCD may refer to:

== Medical uses ==
- Postoperative cognitive dysfunction, cognitive decline following surgery
- Pedophilia-themed OCD, a subtype of OCD
