= Narcotan =

Narcotan is a trade name for two different drugs:

- Halothane, a general anesthetic
- Naloxone, a medication used to reverse the effects of opioids
