= 2,2,3,3-Tetrafluoropropyl trifluoromethyl ether =

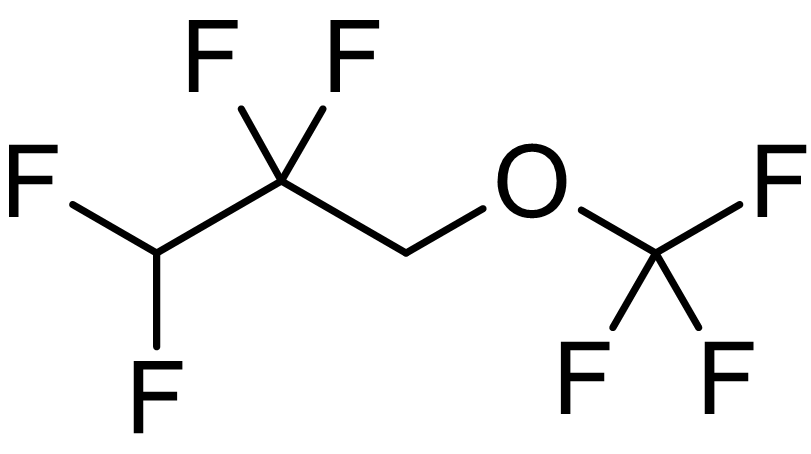

Names
- Preferred IUPAC name 1,1,2,2-Tetrafluoro-3-(trifluoromethoxy)propane

Identifiers
CAS Number	1683-81-4
3D model (JSmol)	Interactive image
ChemSpider	10325629
PubChem CID	23233646
- InChI: InChI=1S/C4H3F7O/c5-2(6)3(7,8)1-12-4(9,10)11/h2H,1H2 Key: XLJTWSJIJSUZLQ-UHFFFAOYSA-N
- SMILES: C(C(C(F)F)(F)F)OC(F)(F)F

Properties
Chemical formula	C_{4}H_{3}F_{7}O
Molar mass	200.056 g·mol^{−1}
Appearance	Colorless liquid
Odor	Sweet smelling
Boiling point	45.5 °C (113.9 °F; 318.6 K)

Hazards
- Occupational safety and health (OHS/OSH)
Main hazards	Highly toxic
- Except where otherwise noted, data are given for materials in their standard state (at 25 °C [77 °F], 100 kPa). Infobox references

2,2,3,3-Tetrafluoropropyl trifluoromethyl ether is a fluorinated ether with convulsant action.

== See also ==
- Flurothyl
