= Methoxyethane =

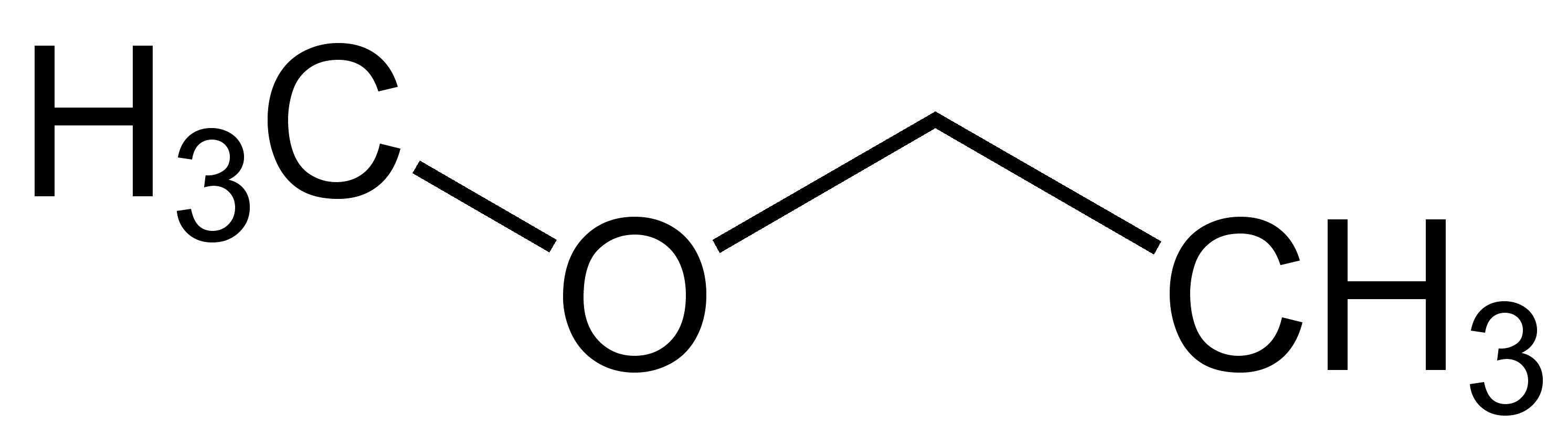
- Skeletal formula

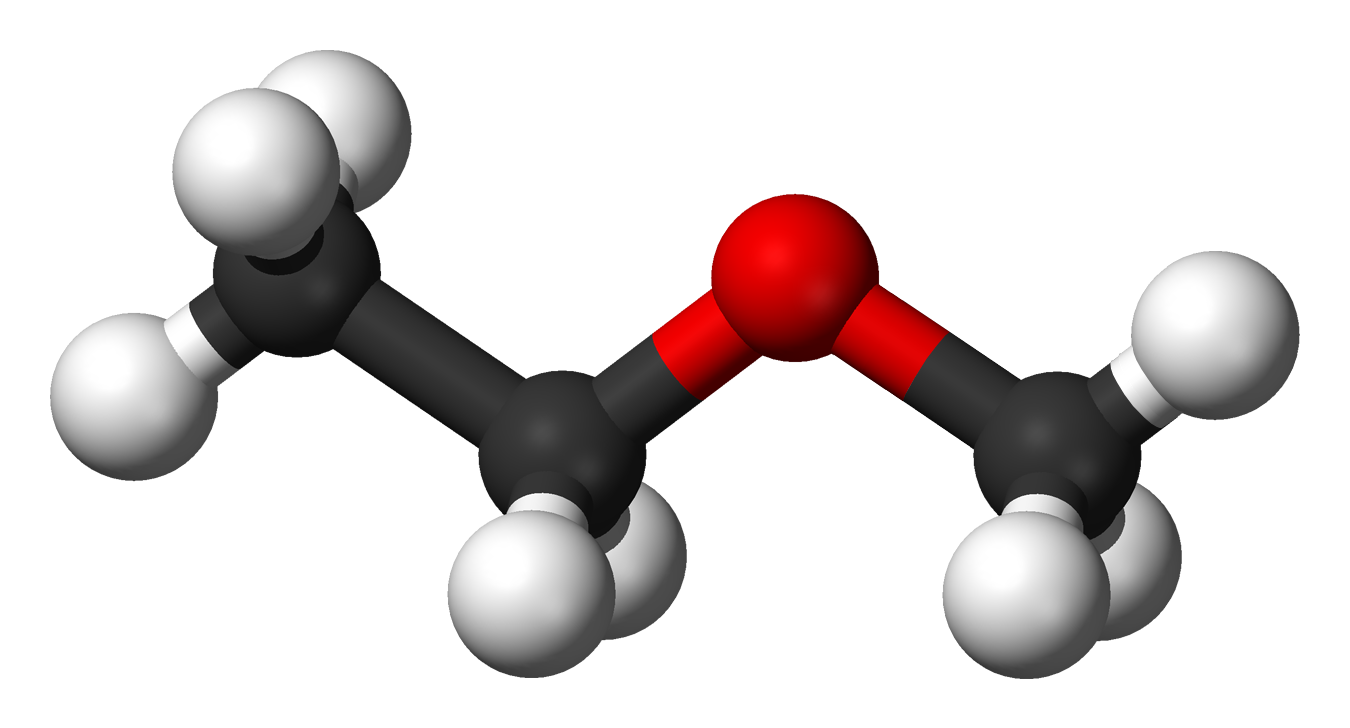
- Ball-and-stick model

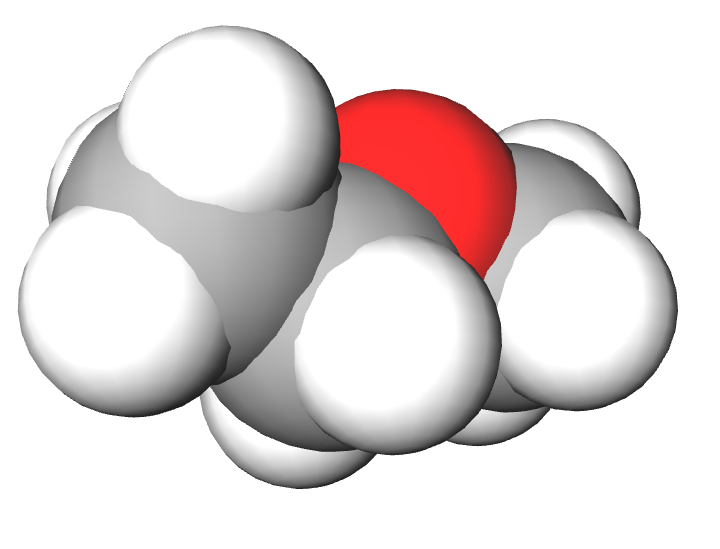
- Space-filling model

Names
- Preferred IUPAC name Methoxyethane
- Other names ethyl methyl ether

Identifiers
CAS Number	540-67-0
3D model (JSmol)	Interactive image
Abbreviations	MeOEt; EtOMe
ChEBI	CHEBI:39832
ChemSpider	10441
ECHA InfoCard	100.128.000
PubChem CID	10903
UNII	TF7D64JK16
CompTox Dashboard (EPA)	DTXSID5074557
- InChI: InChI=1S/C3H8O/c1-3-4-2/h3H2,1-2H3 Key: XOBKSJJDNFUZPF-UHFFFAOYSA-N; InChI=1/C3H8O/c1-3-4-2/h3H2,1-2H3 Key: XOBKSJJDNFUZPF-UHFFFAOYAP
- SMILES: COCC

Properties
Chemical formula	C_{3}H_{8}O
Molar mass	60.096 g·mol^{−1}
Appearance	Colorless gas
Density	0.7251 g cm^{−3} (at 0 °C)
Melting point	−113 °C (−171 °F; 160 K)
Boiling point	7.4 °C (45.3 °F; 280.5 K)
Refractive index (n_{D})	1.3420 (at 4 °C)
Viscosity	0.224 cP at 25 °C

Hazards
- Occupational safety and health (OHS/OSH)
Main hazards	Extremely Flammable (F+), Liquefied gas
Safety data sheet (SDS)	External MSDS

Related compounds
Related Ethers	Dimethyl ether Diethyl ether Methoxypropane
- Except where otherwise noted, data are given for materials in their standard state (at 25 °C [77 °F], 100 kPa). verify (what is ?) Infobox references

Methoxyethane, also known as ethyl methyl ether, is a colorless gaseous ether with the formula CH_{3}OCH_{2}CH_{3}. Unlike the related dimethyl ether and diethyl ether, which are widely used and studied, this mixed alkyl ether has no current applications. It is a structural isomer of isopropyl alcohol. Its utility as an anesthetic and solvent have been investigated.
