= Aliflurane =

Chemical compound

Clinical data
- ATC code: None

Identifiers
- IUPAC name: 1-Chloro-1,2,2,3-tetrafluoro-3-methoxycyclopropane
- CAS Number: 56689-41-9
- PubChem CID: 41967
- ChemSpider: 38279
- UNII: Q1069WKM8G
- CompTox Dashboard (EPA): DTXSID80866580

Chemical and physical data
- Formula: C_{4}H_{3}ClF_{4}O
- Molar mass: 178.51 g·mol^{−1}
- 3D model (JSmol): Interactive image
- SMILES: COC1(C(C1(F)Cl)(F)F)F
- InChI: InChI=1S/C4H3ClF4O/c1-10-4(9)2(5,6)3(4,7)8/h1H3; Key:LZKANMYVPJZLEW-UHFFFAOYSA-N

Aliflurane (code name Hoechst Compound 26 or 26-P) is a halocarbon drug which was investigated as an inhalational anesthetic but was never marketed.

== See also ==
- Halopropane
- Norflurane
- Roflurane
- Synthane
- Teflurane
