= Isoflurothyl =

Names
- Preferred IUPAC name 1,1,1,3,3,3-Hexafluoro-2-methoxypropane
- Other names Hexafluoropropylmethylether, Isoindoklon

Identifiers
CAS Number	13171-18-1
3D model (JSmol)	Interactive image
ChemSpider	23989
ECHA InfoCard	100.124.805
EC Number	603-501-8
PubChem CID	25749
UNII	N8YMW3PAU7
CompTox Dashboard (EPA)	DTXSID80157187
- InChI: InChI=1S/C4H4F6O/c1-11-2(3(5,6)7)4(8,9)10/h2H,1H3 Key: VNXYDFNVQBICRO-UHFFFAOYSA-N
- SMILES: COC(C(F)(F)F)C(F)(F)F

Properties
Chemical formula	C_{4}H_{4}F_{6}O
Molar mass	182.065 g·mol^{−1}
Boiling point	50 °C (122 °F; 323 K)

Hazards
- GHS labelling
Pictograms	(GHS02: Flammable) (GHS07: Exclamation mark)
Signal word	Danger
Hazard statements	H225, H315, H319
Precautionary statements	P210, P233, P240, P241, P242, P243, P264, P280, P302+P352, P303+P361+P353, P305+P351+P338, P321, P332+P313, P337+P313, P362, P370+P378, P403+P235, P501
- Except where otherwise noted, data are given for materials in their standard state (at 25 °C [77 °F], 100 kPa). Infobox references

Isoflurothyl is a fluorinated ether related to the inhalational convulsant flurothyl. It is the structural isomer of flurothyl. Unlike flurothyl, however, isoflurothyl is a general anesthetic.

== See also ==
- Convulsant
- Flurothyl
- Sevoflurane
