= Teflurane =

Chemical compound

Clinical data
- ATC code: None

Identifiers
- IUPAC name: 2-Bromo-1,1,1,2-tetrafluoroethane
- CAS Number: 124-72-1
- PubChem CID: 31300
- ChemSpider: 29040
- UNII: 6492U1O9V8
- CompTox Dashboard (EPA): DTXSID10861765

Chemical and physical data
- Formula: C_{2}HBrF_{4}
- Molar mass: 180.928 g·mol^{−1}
- 3D model (JSmol): Interactive image
- SMILES: C(C(F)(F)F)(F)Br
- InChI: InChI=1S/C2HBrF4/c3-1(4)2(5,6)7/h1H; Key:RZXZIZDRFQFCTA-UHFFFAOYSA-N

Teflurane (INN, USAN, code name Abbott 16900) is a halocarbon drug which was investigated as an inhalational anesthetic but was never marketed. Its clinical development was terminated due to a high incidence of cardiac arrhythmias in patients, similarly to the cases of halopropane and norflurane.

== Chemistry ==
Teflurane is 2-bromo-1,1,1,2-tetrafluoroethane, a haloalkane. It is a gas at standard conditions. The compound is chiral.

== See also ==
- Aliflurane
- Roflurane
- Synthane
