= Halopropane =

Chemical compound

Clinical data
- Trade names: Tebron
- ATC code: None

Identifiers
- IUPAC name: 3-Bromo-1,1,2,2-tetrafluoropropane
- CAS Number: 679-84-5
- PubChem CID: 69623
- ChemSpider: 62826
- UNII: 3DC4A5894W
- CompTox Dashboard (EPA): DTXSID40862366

Chemical and physical data
- Formula: C_{3}H_{3}BrF_{4}
- Molar mass: 194.955 g·mol^{−1}
- 3D model (JSmol): Interactive image
- SMILES: C(C(C(F)F)(F)F)Br
- InChI: InChI=1S/C3H3BrF4/c4-1-3(7,8)2(5)6/h2H,1H2; Key:YVWGMAFXEJHFRO-UHFFFAOYSA-N

Halopropane (synonym FHD-3, trade name Tebron) is a halocarbon drug which was investigated as an inhalational anesthetic but was never marketed. Its clinical development was terminated due to a high incidence of cardiac arrhythmias in patients, similarly to the cases of teflurane and norflurane.

== See also ==
- Aliflurane
- Roflurane
- Synthane
