= Postoperative cognitive dysfunction =

Cognitive decline following surgery

Postoperative cognitive dysfunction (POCD) is a decline in cognitive function (especially in memory and executive functions) that occurs after surgery, especially in patients age 65 and older. The condition may last from 1–12 months, or years, after surgery. POCD is distinct from emergence delirium.

The causes of postoperative cognitive dysfunction are not clear. It is thought that it may be caused by the body's inflammatory response to surgery, stress hormone release during surgery, ischemia, or hypoxaemia. It does not appear to be caused by lack of oxygen or impaired blood flow to the brain and is equally likely under regional and general anesthesia.

Post-operative cognitive dysfunction can complicate a person's recovery from surgery, delay discharge from hospital, delay returning to work following surgery, and reduce a person's quality of life.

== Causes ==
The body's inflammatory response to surgery likely plays an important role, at least in elderly patients. Various research initiatives during recent years have evaluated whether actions taken before, during and after surgery can lessen the possible deleterious effects of inflammation. For example, anti-inflammatory agents can be given before surgery. During surgery, inflammation can be modulated by temperature control, use of regional rather than general anesthesia or the use of beta blockers. After surgery, optimal pain management and infection control is important. Several studies have shown variable-significance positive effects when a multidisciplinary, multifactorial approach to elderly patient is followed during pre, peri and post-operative care.

The release of stress hormones during surgery, ischemia, or hypoxemia may also play a role in causing postoperative cognitive dysfunction.

The role of anesthetics in causing postoperative cognitive dysfunction is not clear. A comparison between inhalation anesthetics and intravenous anesthetics to determine which were more likely to cause postoperative cognitive dysfunction when used in the elderly for non-cardiac surgery found that fewer people experienced POCD with total intravenous anesthesia (TIVA) compared to inhalational anesthesia, however, these conclusions are of low quality and further research is necessary to determine differences between the two approaches to anesthesia.

== Prevention ==
Approaches to prevent postoperative cognitive dysfunction include monitoring of anesthetic during surgery and ensuring that the person is in the optimal range to ensure that they are not aware of their surroundings and do not feel pain. An electroencephalograph (EEG) may help guide the surgical team to determine the optimum depth of anesthesia and prevent high or low doses during the surgical procedure. This approach may reduce the risk of a neuroinflammatory response and/or neurological disturbances including cognitive dysfunction.

== Assessment ==
Cognitive tests are given prior to operations to establish a baseline. The same tests are again given post-operatively to determine the extent and duration of the decline for POCD. "A project examining adults 55 and older who have major non-cardiac surgeries is finding that 'upward of 30 percent of patients is testing significantly worse than their baseline 3 months later'".

== Epidemiology ==
POCD is common after cardiac surgery, and recent studies have now verified that POCD also exists after major non-cardiac surgery, although at a lower incidence. The risk of POCD increases with age, and the type of surgery is also important because there is a very low incidence associated with minor surgery. POCD is common in adult patients of all ages at hospital discharge after major noncardiac surgery, but only the elderly (aged 60 years or older) are at significant risk for long-term cognitive problems. Patients with POCD are at an increased risk of death in the first year after surgery. Research interest has increased since early 2000, especially as more elderly patients are able to undergo successful minor and major surgeries.

POCD has been studied through various institutions since the inception of the IPOCDS-I study centred in Eindhoven, Netherlands and Copenhagen, Denmark. This study found no causal relationship between cerebral hypoxia and low blood pressure and POCD. Age, duration of anaesthesia, introperative complications, and postoperative infections were found to be associated with POCD.

- POCD is just as likely to occur after operations under regional anesthesia as under general anesthesia.
- More likely after major operations than minor operations.
- More likely after heart operations than other types of surgery.
- More likely in aged than in younger patients.
- More likely in older patients with high alcohol intake.
- People with higher preoperative ASA physical status scores are more likely to develop POCD.
- People with lower educational level are more likely to develop POCD than those with a higher educational level.
- People with prior history of a stroke, even though there is complete functional recovery, are more likely to develop POCD.
- More likely in the elderly with pre-existing declining mental functions, termed mild cognitive impairment (MCI). MCI is a transitional zone between normal mental function and evident Alzheimer's disease or other forms of dementia. It is insidious, and seldom recognized, except in retrospect after affected persons are evidently demented.
- Delirium and severe worsening of mental function is very likely in those with clinically evident Alzheimer's disease or other forms of dementia, as well as those with a history of delirium after previous operations.
