= Synthane =

Chemical compound

Clinical data
- ATC code: None

Identifiers
- IUPAC name: 1-(Difluoromethoxy)-1,2,2,3,3-pentafluoropropane
- CAS Number: 35042-98-9
- PubChem CID: 37027
- ChemSpider: 33977
- CompTox Dashboard (EPA): DTXSID40956476

Chemical and physical data
- Formula: C_{4}H_{3}F_{7}O
- Molar mass: 200.056 g·mol^{−1}
- 3D model (JSmol): Interactive image
- SMILES: C(C(C(F)F)(F)F)(OC(F)F)F
- InChI: InChI=1S/C4H3F7O/c5-1(6)4(10,11)2(7)12-3(8)9/h1-3H; Key:VGZTVHRJEVWFIA-UHFFFAOYSA-N

Synthane (development code BAX-3224) is a halocarbon agent which was investigated as an inhalational anesthetic but was never marketed. It is an isomer of sevoflurane.

== See also ==
- Aliflurane
- Halopropane
- Norflurane
- Roflurane
- Teflurane
