= Bernard Raymond Fink =

British physician (1914–2000)

Bernard Raymond Fink (25 May 1914 – 30 October 2000) was a British physician. Fink was born in London, brought up in Antwerp, Belgium, and emigrated to the United States in 1950. He was bestowed ASA Excellence in Research Award in 1987. He was the secretary of the International Association for the Study of Pain and the President of the Anesthesia History Association. He first explained the Fink Effect in his 1955 paper "Diffusion anoxia". He went to the University of London at 16. He served as a medical officer during World War II in South Africa. He has two daughters.
