= Thiomethoxyflurane =

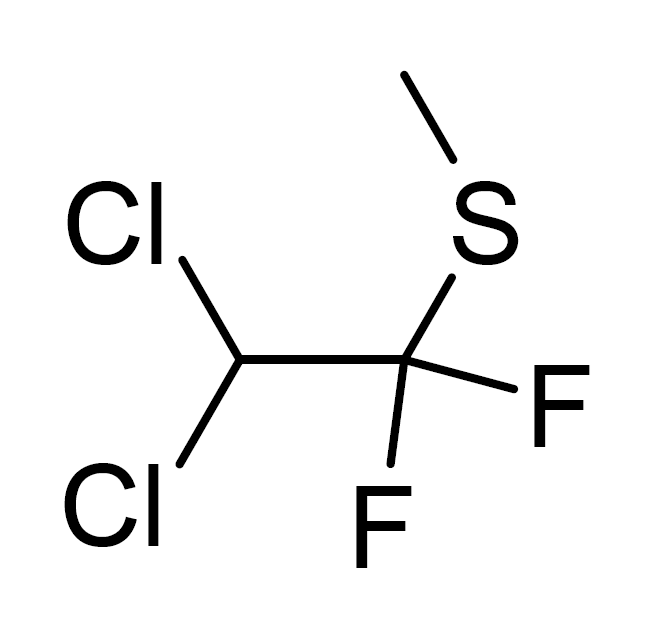

Identifiers
- IUPAC name: 2,2-dichloro-1,1-difluoro-1-methylsulfanylethane
- CAS Number: 2045-53-6
- PubChem CID: 164920
- ChemSpider: 144586
- CompTox Dashboard (EPA): DTXSID80174410

Chemical and physical data
- Formula: C_{3}H_{4}Cl_{2}F_{2}S
- Molar mass: 181.02 g·mol^{−1}
- 3D model (JSmol): Interactive image
- SMILES: CSC(C(Cl)Cl)(F)F
- InChI: InChI=1S/C3H4Cl2F2S/c1-8-3(6,7)2(4)5/h2H,1H3; Key:BJMNUMOCQIVWFA-UHFFFAOYSA-N

Thiomethoxyflurane, is a volatile, inhalational anesthetic. It is an analogue of the widely used inhalational anesthetic methoxyflurane but with the methoxy group replaced by a heavier methylthio group. Thiomethoxyflurane is approximately 7.5x more potent than methoxyflurane, making it the most potent inhalational anesthetic ever discovered, but was never developed for medical use due to its lower volatility, higher toxicity, and longer duration of action compared to methoxyflurane. However, its high potency has made it useful for research into the mechanism of action of volatile anesthetics and identifying the receptor targets at which they act.
