= Roflurane =

Medication

Clinical data
- ATC code: None

Identifiers
- IUPAC name: 2-Bromo-1,1,2-trifluoro-1-methoxyethane
- CAS Number: 679-90-3
- PubChem CID: 12676
- ChemSpider: 12155
- UNII: QP8Q61T44L
- CompTox Dashboard (EPA): DTXSID00862367

Chemical and physical data
- Formula: C_{3}H_{4}BrF_{3}O
- Molar mass: 192.963 g·mol^{−1}
- 3D model (JSmol): Interactive image
- SMILES: COC(C(F)Br)(F)F
- InChI: InChI=1S/C3H4BrF3O/c1-8-3(6,7)2(4)5/h2H,1H3; Key:YOQYDUAUSFAUER-UHFFFAOYSA-N

Roflurane (INN, USAN; development code DA-893) is a halocarbon drug which was investigated as an inhalational anesthetic but was never marketed.

== See also ==
- Aliflurane
- Halopropane
- Norflurane
- Synthane
- Teflurane
