= Emergence delirium =

- Other names: Agitated emergence, emergence agitation, emergence excitement, postanesthetic excitement
- Specialty: Anesthesia
- Symptoms: Auditory and Visual Hallucinations; uncontrollable screaming, crying, panic attacks; and uncontrollable body movements
- Usual onset: ranges from immediately on awakening to weeks later
- Duration: few minutes to months

Emergence delirium is a condition in which emergence from general anesthesia is accompanied by psychomotor agitation. This phenomenon can result in significant discomfort to the patient, as well as their treatment team and any family members who may be present. It may require additional nursing and medical treatment (especially treatment with analgesics or sedatives), which may delay discharge from the facility.

== Children ==
The Pediatric Anesthetic Emergence Delirium (PAED) scale or the Cornell Assessment of Pediatric Delirium may be used to measure the severity of this condition in children. In this patient population, emergence delirium is typically identified within the first 30 minutes of recovery from anesthesia. It terminates within five to fifteen minutes with spontaneous resolution.

Emergence delirium occurs with similar frequency after anesthesia with desflurane and isoflurane. Rapid awakening from these inhaled anesthetics may worsen the child's natural apprehension upon suddenly finding him/herself in an unfamiliar environment.

Emergence delirium in children has been associated with the type of surgery, type of anesthesia, and the use of adjunct medications, but the identification of its underlying cause remains elusive. Some see a relation to pavor nocturnus, while others see a relation to the excitement stage of anesthesia.

== Elderly ==
Elderly people are more likely to experience confusion or problems with thinking following surgery, which can occur up to several days postoperatively. These cognitive problems can last for weeks or months and can affect the patients' ability to plan, focus, remember, or undertake activities of daily living. A review of intravenous versus inhalational maintenance of anaesthesia for postoperative cognitive outcomes in elderly people undergoing non-cardiac surgery showed little or no difference in postoperative delirium according to the type of anaesthetic maintenance agents from five studies (321 participants). The authors of this review were uncertain whether maintenance of anaesthesia with propofol-based total intravenous anaesthesia (TIVA) or with inhalational agents can affect incidences of postoperative delirium. Emergence delirium has been associated with long-term changes in neurocognitive function after cardiac surgery.

A cohort study which included 560 adults aged 70 years and older for six years revealed that delirium represents the most common post-operative complication and is associated with long-term cognitive decline and increased incidence of dementia.

== Epidemiology ==
The overall incidence of emergence delirium is 5.3%, with a significantly greater incidence (12–13%) in children. The incidence of emergence delirium after halothane, isoflurane, sevoflurane or desflurane ranges from 2–55%. Most emergence delirium in the literature describes agitated emergence. Unless a delirium detection tool is used, it is difficult to distinguish if the agitated emergence from anesthesia was from delirium or pain or fear, etc. A research study of 400 adult patients emerging from general anesthesia in the PACU were assessed for delirium using the Confusion Assessment Method for the ICU (CAM-ICU) found rates of emergence delirium of 31% at PACU admission with rates declining to 8% by one hour.
