= Endogenous anesthetic =

Endogenous anesthetics are analogs of anesthetics the body makes that have the properties and similar mode of action of general anesthetics.

== Types of endogenous anesthetics ==
=== Carbon dioxide ===
Carbon dioxide (CO_{2}) is an abundant gas produced as the final product of glucose metabolism in animals. CO_{2} anesthesia is most frequently used for anesthetizing flies. But it has also been considered as a fast acting anesthetic in small laboratory animals and in humans.

In the 1900s, CO_{2} anesthesia, known as CO_{2} therapy was used by psychiatrists for the treatment of anxiety. The patients would receive 70% CO_{2} in combination with 30% oxygen causing rapid and reversible loss of continuousness.

=== Ammonia ===
Ammonia has also been shown to have anesthetic properties. It is released during protein catabolism, and its presence reduced the requirement for inhaled anesthetics. Whether the endogenous release of the ammonia is contributing to an anesthetic effect in vivo has not yet been established.

== Mechanism of action ==
The most abundant endogenous anesthetics are small hydrophobic gaseous metabolites of catabolism and likely work through a membrane-mediated mechanism of general anesthesia.

In the 1800s anoxia was considered the mechanism of CO_{2} anesthesia. However, studies in humans showed the opposite, oxygenation of the brain tissue increases with increase CO_{2} in the lung. More recent studies have shown in bees that anoxia is also not the mechanism.

In humans, CO_{2} raises the threshold of stimulation of the nerve cell, decreases the speed of conduction of impulses along the nerve, and increases the height and prolonged duration of the action potential.

While the endogenous anesthetics appear to have a similar mechanism of action to inhaled anesthetics, their rapid endogenous metabolism complicates their use in humans. Apart from flies, exogenous compounds have proven more useful for maintaining general anesthesia.

== History ==
The first private demonstration of an anesthetic was carbon dioxide by Henry Hill Hickman in a dog cerca 1823.
