= Concentration effect =

Effect affecting the pulmonary alveolar gas concentration during anesthesia

In the study of inhaled anesthetics, the concentration effect is the increase in the rate that the Fa (alveolar concentration)/Fi (inspired concentration) ratio rises as the alveolar concentration of that gas is increased. In simple terms, the higher the concentration of gas administered, the faster the alveolar concentration of that gas approaches the inspired concentration. In modern practice it is only relevant for nitrous oxide since other inhaled anesthetics are delivered at much lower concentrations due to their higher potency.

== See also ==
- Second gas effect
