= Methoxypropane =

Names
- Preferred IUPAC name 1-Methoxypropane
- Other names Propane, 1-methoxy- methyl propyl ether Metopryl; Neothyl propane, 1-methoxy methyl n-propyl ether

Identifiers
CAS Number	557-17-5
3D model (JSmol)	Interactive image
ChemSpider	10709
ECHA InfoCard	100.008.327
EC Number	209-158-7
PubChem CID	11182
RTECS number	KO2280000
UNII	37D15RN2Z8
UN number	2612
CompTox Dashboard (EPA)	DTXSID0074558
- InChI: InChI=1S/C4H10O/c1-3-4-5-2/h3-4H2,1-2H3 Key: VNKYTQGIUYNRMY-UHFFFAOYSA-N; InChI=1/C4H10O/c1-3-4-5-2/h3-4H2,1-2H3
- SMILES: O(CCC)C

Properties
Chemical formula	C_{4}H_{10}O
Molar mass	74.12
Density	0.7356 g/cm^{3}
Boiling point	38.8 °C (101.8 °F; 311.9 K)
Solubility in water	30.5 g/L
Refractive index (n_{D})	1.35837 (14.3 °C)
Viscosity	0.3064 cP (0.3 °C)

Pharmacology
Routes of administration	inhalation

Hazards
NFPA 704 (fire diamond)	0 3 0
Flash point	< −20 °C (−4 °F; 253 K)
Explosive limits	1.9–11.8%
- Except where otherwise noted, data are given for materials in their standard state (at 25 °C [77 °F], 100 kPa). verify (what is ?) Infobox references

Methoxypropane, or methyl propyl ether, is an ether once used as a general anaesthetic. It is a clear colorless flammable liquid with a boiling point of 38.8 °C.

Marketed under the trade names Metopryl and Neothyl, methoxypropane was used as an alternative to diethyl ether because of its greater potency. Its use as an anaesthetic has since been supplanted by modern halogenated ethers which are much less flammable.
