= Laryngospasm =

Involuntary contraction of the vocal folds restricting inhalation

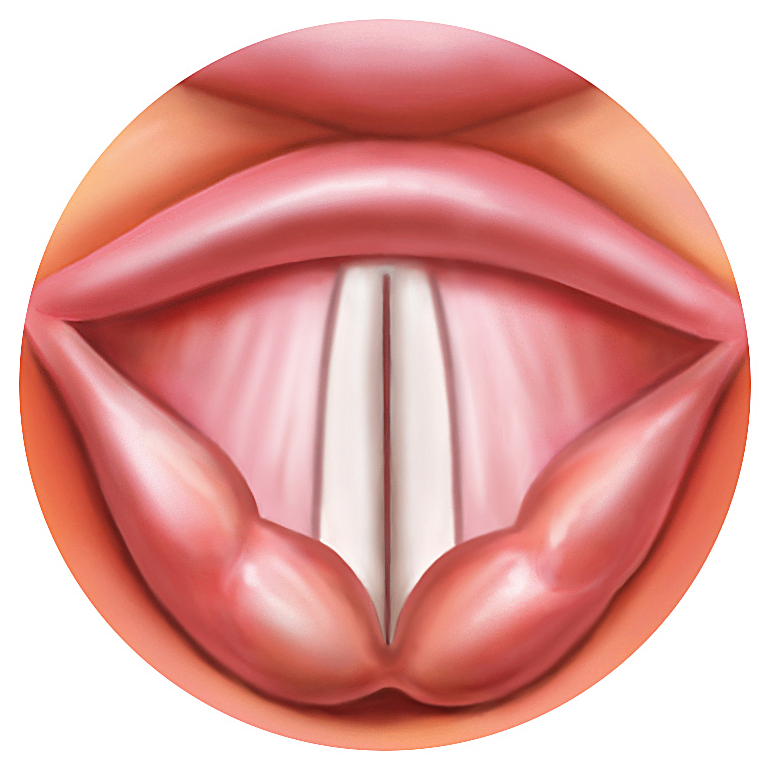
- Specialty: Otolaryngology, anesthesiology, emergency medicine

Laryngospasm is an uncontrolled or involuntary muscular contraction (spasm) of the vocal folds. It may be triggered when the vocal cords or the area of the trachea below the vocal folds detects the entry of water, mucus, blood, or other substance. It may be associated with stridor or retractions.

== Signs and symptoms ==
Laryngospasm is characterized by involuntary spasms of the laryngeal muscles. It is associated with difficulty or inability to breathe or speak, retractions, a feeling of suffocation, which may be followed by hypoxia-induced loss of consciousness. It may be followed by paroxysmal coughing and in partial laryngospasms, a stridor may be heard. It requires prompt identification to avoid possibly fatal complications. It may present with loss of end-tidal carbon dioxide (for mechanically ventilated patients), chest or neck retractions and paradoxical chest wall movements.

The condition typically lasts less than 60 seconds, but in cases of partial blocking it may last 20 to 30 minutes and hinder inspiration, while exhalation remains easier.

== Causes ==
Laryngospasm is a primitive protective airway reflex that functions to protect against aspiration. However, it may be detrimental if there is sustained closure of the glottis resulting in blockage of respiration that hinders the free flow of air. It may be triggered when the vocal cords or the area of the trachea below the vocal folds detects the entry of water, mucus, blood, or other substance.

It is most often reported 1) post-operatively after endotracheal extubation or 2) after sudden reflux of gastric contents. It is common in drowning. It is estimated that in 10% of cases of drowning as a response to inhalation of water, death occurs by asphyxia due to laryngospasm without any water in the lungs. It is also a symptom of hypoparathyroidism. It can sometimes occur during sleep, waking up the affected person. These episodic interruptions of sleep have been attributed to acute irritation due to gastro-oesophageal reflux. Laryngospasm is also an unlikely but possible side effect of ketamine administration. Laryngospasm may happen in people with neurological disease.

In children, rapid detection and management are imperative to prevent deadly complications such as cardiac arrest, hypoxia and bradycardia.

Patients with a history of significant aspiration, asthma, exposure to airway irritants (smoke, dust, mold, fumes, use of Desflurane), upper respiratory infections, airway anomalies, light anesthesia and patients with acute mental status depression may be at increased risk.

== Prevention ==
When gastroesophageal reflux disease (GERD) is the trigger, treatment of GERD can help manage laryngospasm. Proton pump inhibitors such as Dexlansoprazole (Dexilant), Esomeprazole (Nexium), and Lansoprazole (Prevacid) reduce the production of stomach acids, making reflux fluids less irritant. Prokinetic agents reduce the amount of acid available by stimulating movement in the digestive tract.

Patients who are prone to laryngospasm during illness can take measures to prevent irritation such as antacids to avoid acid reflux.

For acute context, making an upright position of the upper part of the body has been shown to shorten the spasm episodes. Fixation of the arms on stabilization of the body and slowing of breathing is also recommended.

== Incidence ==
Incidence has been estimated at approximately 1% in both adult and pediatric populations. Its incidence is reported to be more than triple in the very young (birth to 3 months of age), increasing to 10% in those with reactive airways. Other sub-populations with high incidence of laryngospams include patients undergoing tonsillectomy and adenoidectomy (25%).

It is likely that more than 10% of drownings involve laryngospasm, but the evidence suggests that it is not usually effective at preventing water from entering the trachea.

== Treatment ==
Most minor laryngospasm get better on its own for most people.

Laryngospasm is one of the most common intraoperative complications. It may be life-threatening as it involves reflex closure of the laryngeal muscles and thus results in inability to ventilate the patient. Treatment requires clearing secretions from the oropharynx, applying continuous positive airway pressure with 100% oxygen, followed by deepening the plane of anaesthesia with propofol, and/or paralyzing with succinylcholine.

== See also ==
- Laryngotracheal stenosis
