= Halogenated ether =

Subcategory of ether used in anesthesiology

Structural formula of isoflurane, a typical halogenated ether-anesthetic.

Halogenated ethers are a subcategory of ethers—organic chemicals that contain an oxygen atom connected to two alkyl groups. Halogenated ethers differ from other ethers because there are one or more halogen atoms—fluorine, chlorine, bromine, or iodine—as substituents on the carbon groups.

== Applications ==
=== Chloroalkyl ethers ===
Chlorinated ethers are the halogenated ethers produced on the largest scale. Key members:

- Bis(chloromethyl) ether, alkylating agent
- Bis(2-chloroethyl) ether, a solvent
- Bis(2-chloroisopropyl) ether, also a solvent

=== Anesthesia ===
Inhaled ether are critical in anesthesia. Diethyl ether initially replaced non-flammable (but more toxic) halogenated hydrocarbons like chloroform and trichloroethylene. Halothane is a halogenated hydrocarbon anesthetic agent that was introduced into clinical practice in 1956. Due to its ease of use and improved safety profile with respect to organ toxicity, halothane quickly replaced chloroform and trichloroethylene.

The anesthesia practice was significantly improved later in the 1950s with the introduction of halogenated ethers, like isoflurane, enflurane, and sevoflurane. Since its introduction in the 1980s, isoflurane has been widely used due to its decreased risk of hepatotoxicity and better hemodynamic stability when compared to halothane. The 1990s saw the development of sevoflurane, which was especially helpful in pediatric anesthesia because it provided even faster induction and recovery profiles.

All inhalation anesthetics in current clinical use are halogenated ethers, except for halothane (which is a halogenated hydrocarbon or haloalkane), nitrous oxide, and xenon.

Inhalation anesthetics are vaporized and mixed with other gases prior to their inhalation by the patient before or during surgery. These other gases always include oxygen or air, but may also include other gases such as nitrous oxide or helium. In most surgical situations, other drugs such as opiates are used for pain and skeletal muscle relaxants are used to cause temporary paralysis. Additional drugs such as midazolam may be used to produce amnesia during surgery. Although newer intravenous anesthetics (such as propofol) have increased the options of anesthesiologists, halogenated ethers remain a mainstay of general anesthesia.

Common halogenated ethers used for anesthesia
Halogenated Ether	Chemical Formula	Chemical Structure	Use
Sevoflurane	C_{4}H_{3}F_{7}O		Induction and maintenance of general anesthesia for adults and children.
Isoflurane	C_{3}H_{2}ClF_{5}O		Induction and maintenance of general anesthesia for adults and children.
Desflurane	C_{3}H_{2}F_{6}O		Induction and maintenance of general anesthesia for adults. Maintenance in children following induction by other agents.
Methoxyflurane	C_{3}H_{4}Cl_{2}F_{2}O		Short term pain relief; rarely used for chronic pain or as an anesthetic because of nephrotoxicity risks.
Enflurane	C_{3}H_{2}ClF_{5}O		Induction and maintenance of general anesthesia. Used to reduce pain during vaginal delivery.

=== Polymers ===
Polyethersulfones are high performance polymers prepared from diarylether precursors

Polysulfones (polysulfone (PSU), polyethersulfone (PES/PESU), and polyphenylsulfone (PPSU)are a family of high-performance thermoplastics. These polymers are known for their toughness and stability at high temperatures. Technically used polysulfones contain an aryl-SO_{2}-aryl subunit. Due to the high cost of raw materials and processing, polysulfones are used in specialty applications and often are a superior replacement for polycarbonates.

=== Flame Retardant ===
Halogenated ethers play a significant role in enhancing the thermal stability and fire resistance of polymers. When applied to materials, they are effective in preventing items from catching fire because of the chemical's resistance to decomposition and effective flame suppression properties.

Most halogenated ethers contain bromine or chlorine. Brominated compounds are particularly effective because they release bromine radicals when exposed to heat. These radicals interrupt the combustion process by reacting with free radicals in the flame, thereby suppressing fire propagation. Chlorinated ethers can also function similarly by releasing chlorine radicals. Both types of halogens contribute to the flame-retardant properties, but brominated ethers are often favoured for their higher efficiency and lower required concentrations compared to their chlorinated counterparts.

Decabromodiphenyl ether

Decabromodiphenyl ether (deca-BDE), a type of Polybrominated diphenyl ether (PBDEs), is a brominated flame retardant. It was widely used in polystyrene, acrylonitrile butadiene styrene (ABS), flexible polyurethane foam, textile coatings, wire/cable insulation, electrical connectors, and other interior parts. Decabromodiphenyl ether is one of many halogenated flame retardants that are now are heavily regulated or banned in many regions because of bioaccumulation and potential toxicity hazards. Most industries are now transitioning to alternative, less hazardous flame retardants. However, because of the widespread use of these chemicals in many products, it is anticipated that they will continue to persist in the environment.

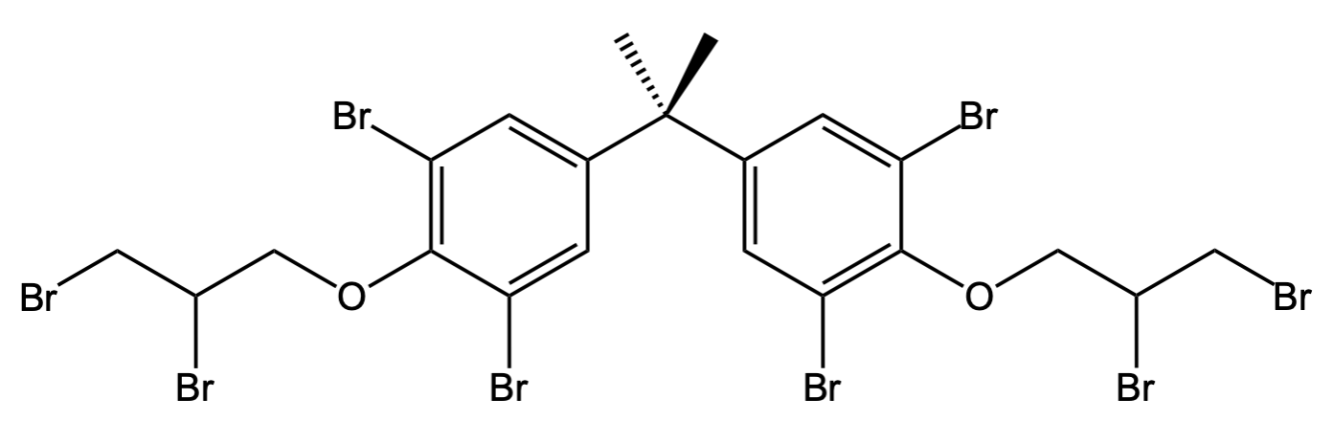
Tetrabromobisphenol A bis(2,3-dibromopropyl) ether (TBBPA-DBPE)

Tetrabromobisphenol A bis(2,3-dibromopropyl) ether (TBBPA-DBPE) is another type of brominated flame retardant. It is widely used in electronic casings and circuit boards due to its high efficiency in reducing flammability. TBBPA-DBPE is also a flame retardant in plastics, paper, and textiles, and as plasticizer in adhesives and coatings.

== Toxicology ==
=== Respiratory Depression ===
Halogenated ethers can cause respiratory depression by reducing the body's response to carbon dioxide and hypoxia, which affects breathing rates and depth. Some, like desflurane and isoflurane, are also known for causing airway irritation. This can cause coughing, breath-holding, or laryngospasm, particularly during inhalational induction of anesthesia. Sevoflurane has minimal airway irritation and is generally preferred for induction, particularly in children or those with sensitive airways.

=== Environmental Impact ===
==== Greenhouse Gas Emissions ====
Halogenated ethers are greenhouse gases and contribute to global warming. Compounds like desflurane and isoflurane have high global warming potentials (GWP), which measure their heat-trapping abilities relative to carbon dioxide (CO_{2}). The GWP of a halogenated anesthetic is up to 2,000 times greater than CO_{2}. The use of these anesthetics in healthcare is a significant contributor to hospital-related greenhouse gas emissions. There is a growing focus on identifying lower-GWP alternatives or enhancing recovery and recycling technologies for anesthetic gases.

==== Persistence and Bioaccumulation ====
Halogenated ethers can persist in the atmosphere for years, adding to the atmospheric burden of greenhouse gases. They are generally not bioaccumulative due to its high volatility and low tendency to dissolve in water or adhere to biological tissues.

== See also ==
- Anesthesia
- Ether
- Halogen
- Halogenation
- Hydrocarbon
