= Halothane =

General anaesthetic

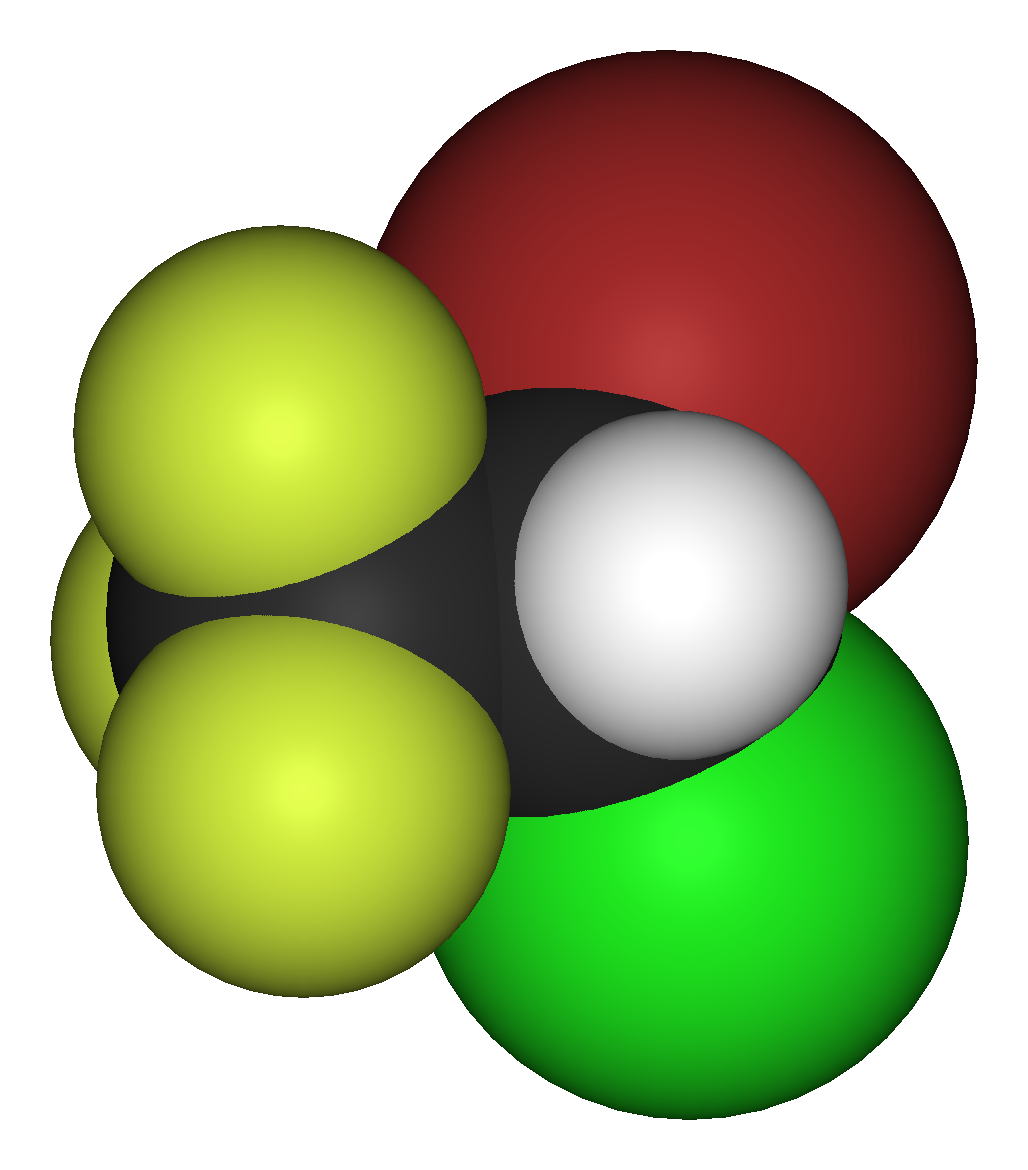

Clinical data
- Trade names: Fluothane, Somnothane, Rhodialothan
- AHFS/Drugs.com: FDA Professional Drug Information
- License data: US DailyMed: Halothane
- Routes of administration: Inhalation
- Drug class: Volatile anesthetic
- ATC code: N01AB01 (WHO)

Legal status
- Legal status: BR: Class C1 (Other controlled substances); US: ℞-only

Pharmacokinetic data
- Metabolism: Hepatic (CYP2E1)
- Excretion: Kidney, respiratory

Identifiers
- IUPAC name: 2-Bromo-2-chloro-1,1,1-trifluoroethane
- CAS Number: 151-67-7
- PubChem CID: 3562
- IUPHAR/BPS: 2401
- DrugBank: DB01159
- ChemSpider: 3441
- UNII: UQT9G45D1P
- KEGG: D00542
- ChEBI: CHEBI:5615
- ChEMBL: ChEMBL931
- CompTox Dashboard (EPA): DTXSID4025371
- ECHA InfoCard: 100.005.270

Chemical and physical data
- Formula: C_{2}HBrClF_{3}
- Molar mass: 197.38 g·mol^{−1}
- 3D model (JSmol): Interactive image
- Density: 1.871 g/cm^{3} (at 20 °C)
- Melting point: −118 °C (−180 °F)
- Boiling point: 50.2 °C (122.4 °F)
- SMILES: BrC(Cl)C(F)(F)F
- InChI: InChI=1S/C2HBrClF3/c3-1(4)2(5,6)7/h1H; Key:BCQZXOMGPXTTIC-UHFFFAOYSA-N

- MAC: 0.75 (40 Year Old)
- Blood:gas partition coefficient: 2.3
- Oil:gas partition coefficient: 224

Halothane (bromochlorotrifluoroethane), sold under the brand name Fluothane among others, is a halocarbon with the chemical formula CF_{3}CHBrCl. It is used as a general anaesthetic given by inhalation. It can be used to induce or maintain anaesthesia. Its use in developed countries has been mostly replaced by newer anesthetic agents such as sevoflurane. One of its benefits is that it does not increase the production of saliva, which can be particularly useful in those who are difficult to intubate.

Side effects include an irregular heartbeat, respiratory depression, and hepatotoxicity. Like all volatile anesthetics, it should not be used in people with a personal or family history of malignant hyperthermia. It appears to be safe in porphyria. It is unclear whether its usage during pregnancy is harmful to the fetus, and its use during a C-section is generally discouraged. Halothane is a chiral molecule that is used as a racemic mixture.

Halothane was discovered in 1951. It was approved for medical use in the United States in 1958. It was removed from the World Health Organization's List of Essential Medicines in 2025 in favor of safer alternatives. It is not available in the United States. Halothane may contribute to ozone depletion.

== Medical uses ==
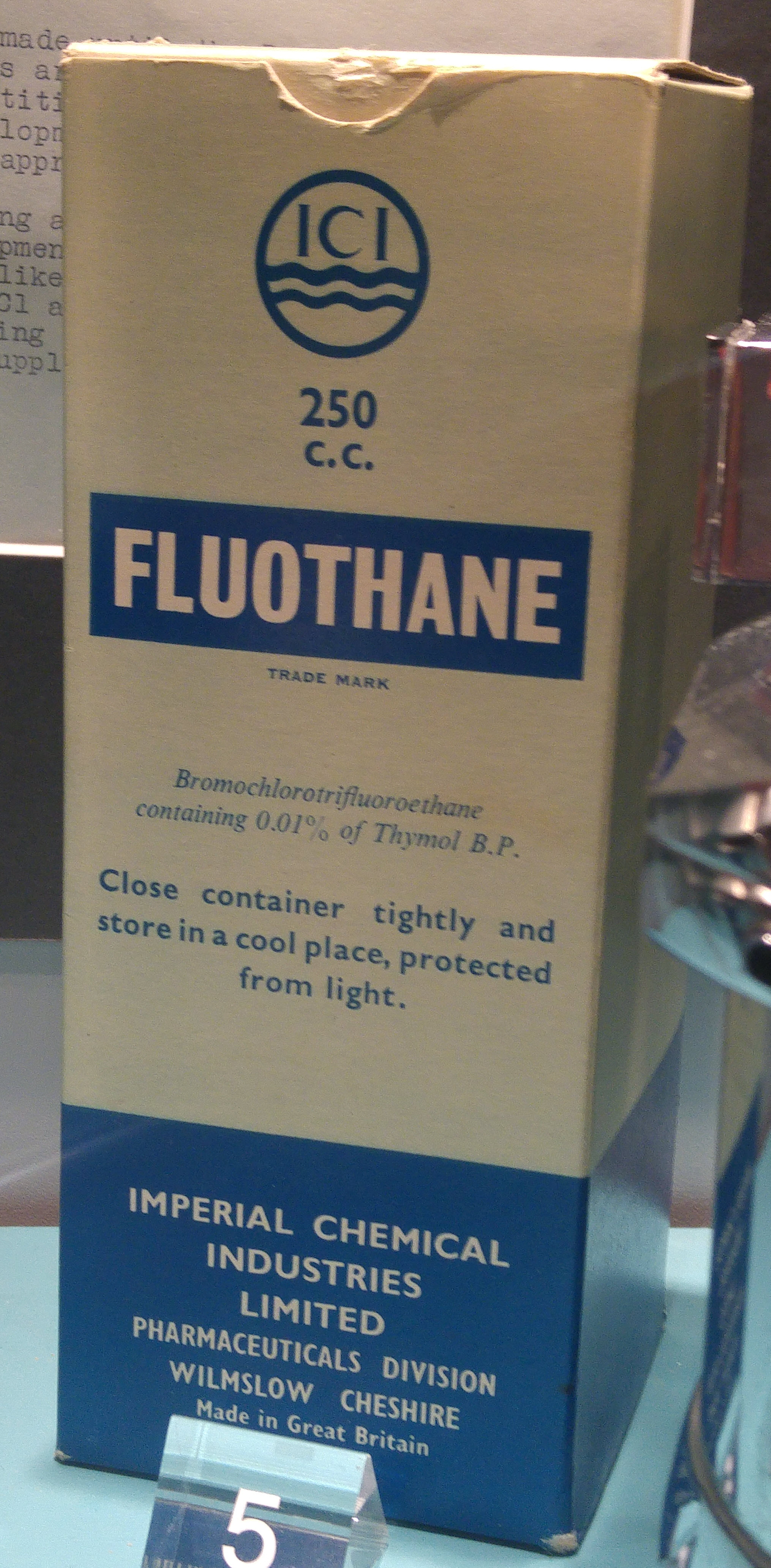
Packaging of Fluothane brand of halothane

It is a potent anesthetic with a minimum alveolar concentration (MAC) of 0.74%. Its blood/gas partition coefficient of 2.4 makes it an agent with moderate induction and recovery time. It is not a good analgesic and its muscle relaxation effect is moderate.

Halothane is colour-coded red on anaesthetic vaporisers.

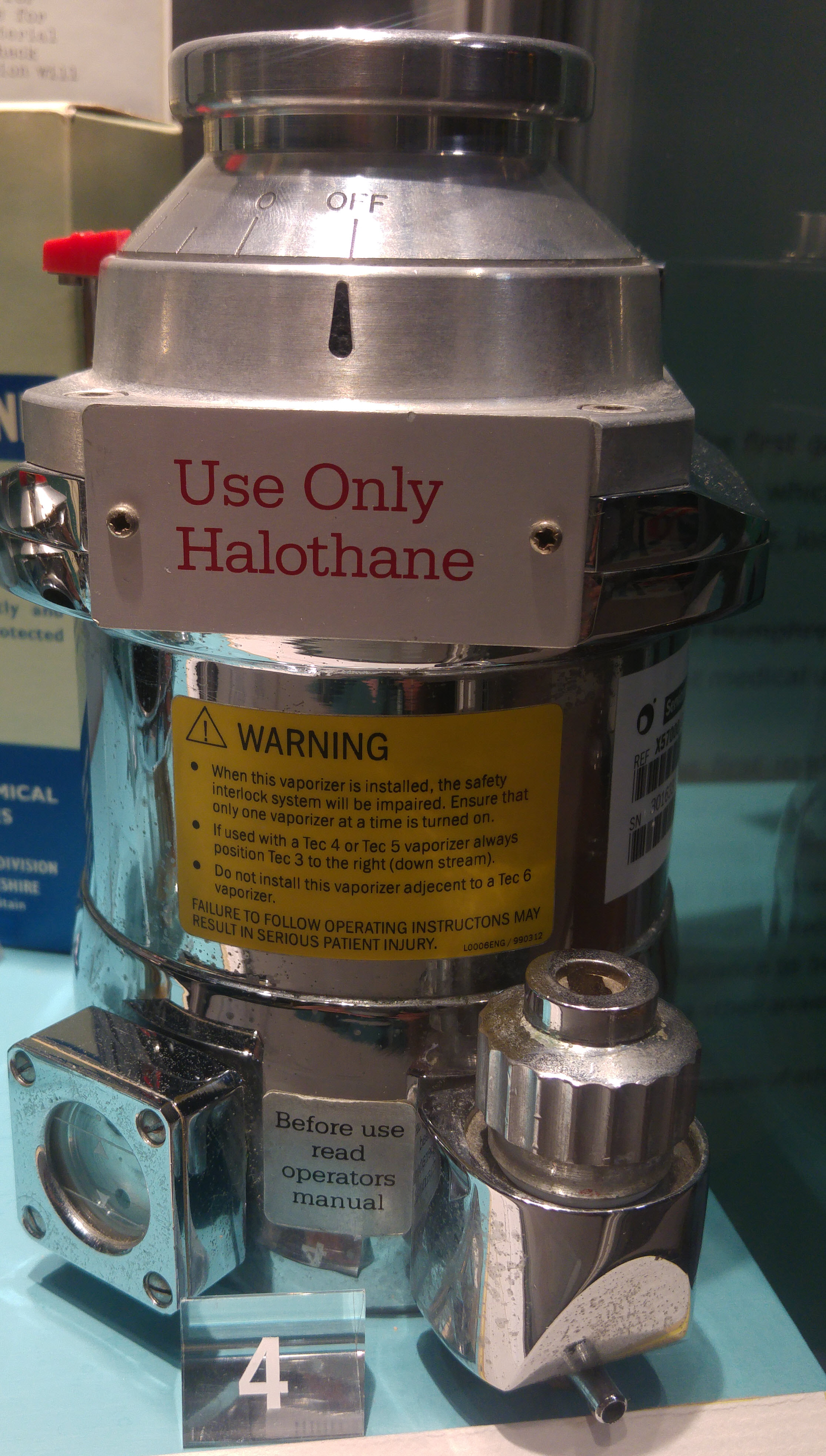
Vaporiser used for halothane

== Side effects ==
Side effects include irregular heartbeat, respiratory depression, and hepatotoxicity. It appears to be safe in porphyria. It is unclear whether use during pregnancy is harmful to the baby, and it is not generally recommended for use during a C-section. In rare cases, repeated exposure to halothane in adults was noted to result in severe liver injury. This occurred in about one in 10,000 exposures. The resulting syndrome was referred to as halothane hepatitis, immunoallergic in origin, and is thought to result from the metabolism of halothane to trifluoroacetic acid via oxidative reactions in the liver. About 20% of inhaled halothane is metabolized by the liver and these products are excreted in the urine. The hepatitis syndrome had a mortality rate of 30% to 70%. Concern for hepatitis resulted in a dramatic reduction in the use of halothane for adults and it was replaced in the 1980s by enflurane and isoflurane. By 2005, the most common volatile anesthetics used were isoflurane, sevoflurane, and desflurane. Since the risk of halothane hepatitis in children was substantially lower than in adults, halothane continued to be used in pediatrics in the 1990s as it was especially useful for inhalation induction of anesthesia. However, by 2000, sevoflurane, excellent for inhalation induction, had largely replaced the use of halothane in children.

Halothane sensitises the heart to catecholamines, so it is liable to cause cardiac arrhythmia, occasionally fatal, particularly if hypercapnia has been allowed to develop. This seems to be especially problematic in dental anesthesia.

Like all the potent inhalational anaesthetic agents, it is a potent trigger for malignant hyperthermia. Similarly, in common with the other potent inhalational agents, it relaxes uterine smooth muscle and this may increase blood loss during delivery or termination of pregnancy.

=== Occupational safety ===
People can be exposed to halothane in the workplace by breathing it in as waste anaesthetic gas, skin contact, eye contact, or swallowing it. The National Institute for Occupational Safety and Health (NIOSH) has set a recommended exposure limit (REL) of 2 ppm (16.2 mg/m^{3}) over 60 minutes.

== Pharmacology ==
The exact mechanism of the action of general anaesthetics has not been delineated. Halothane activates GABA_{A} and glycine receptors. It also acts as an NMDA receptor antagonist, inhibits nACh and voltage-gated sodium channels, and activates 5-HT_{3} and twin-pore K^{+} channels. It does not affect the AMPA or kainate receptors.

== Chemical and physical properties ==
Halothane (2-bromo-2-chloro-1,1,1-trifluoroethane) is a very dense, clear, colourless, nonflammable liquid with a chloroform-like sweet odour. It is highly volatile, having a vapor pressure of 32.5 kPa at 20 °C. It is very slightly soluble in water and miscible with various organic solvents. Halothane can decompose to hydrogen fluoride, hydrogen chloride and hydrogen bromide in the presence of light and heat.

Chemically, halothane is an alkyl halide (not an ether like many other anesthetics). The structure has one stereocenter, so (R)- and (S)-optical isomers occur.

== Synthesis ==
The commercial synthesis of halothane starts from trichloroethylene, which is reacted with hydrogen fluoride in the presence of antimony trichloride at 130 °C to form 2-chloro-1,1,1-trifluoroethane. This is then reacted with bromine at 450 °C to produce halothane.

== Related substances ==
Attempts to find anesthetics with less metabolism led to halogenated ethers such as enflurane and isoflurane. The incidence of hepatic reactions with these agents is lower. The exact degree of hepatotoxic potential of enflurane is debated, although it is minimally metabolized. Isoflurane is essentially not metabolized and reports of associated liver injury are quite rare. Small amounts of trifluoroacetic acid can be formed from both halothane and isoflurane metabolism and possibly accounts for cross sensitization of patients between these agents.

The main advantage of the more modern agents is lower blood solubility, resulting in faster induction of and recovery from anaesthesia.

== History ==
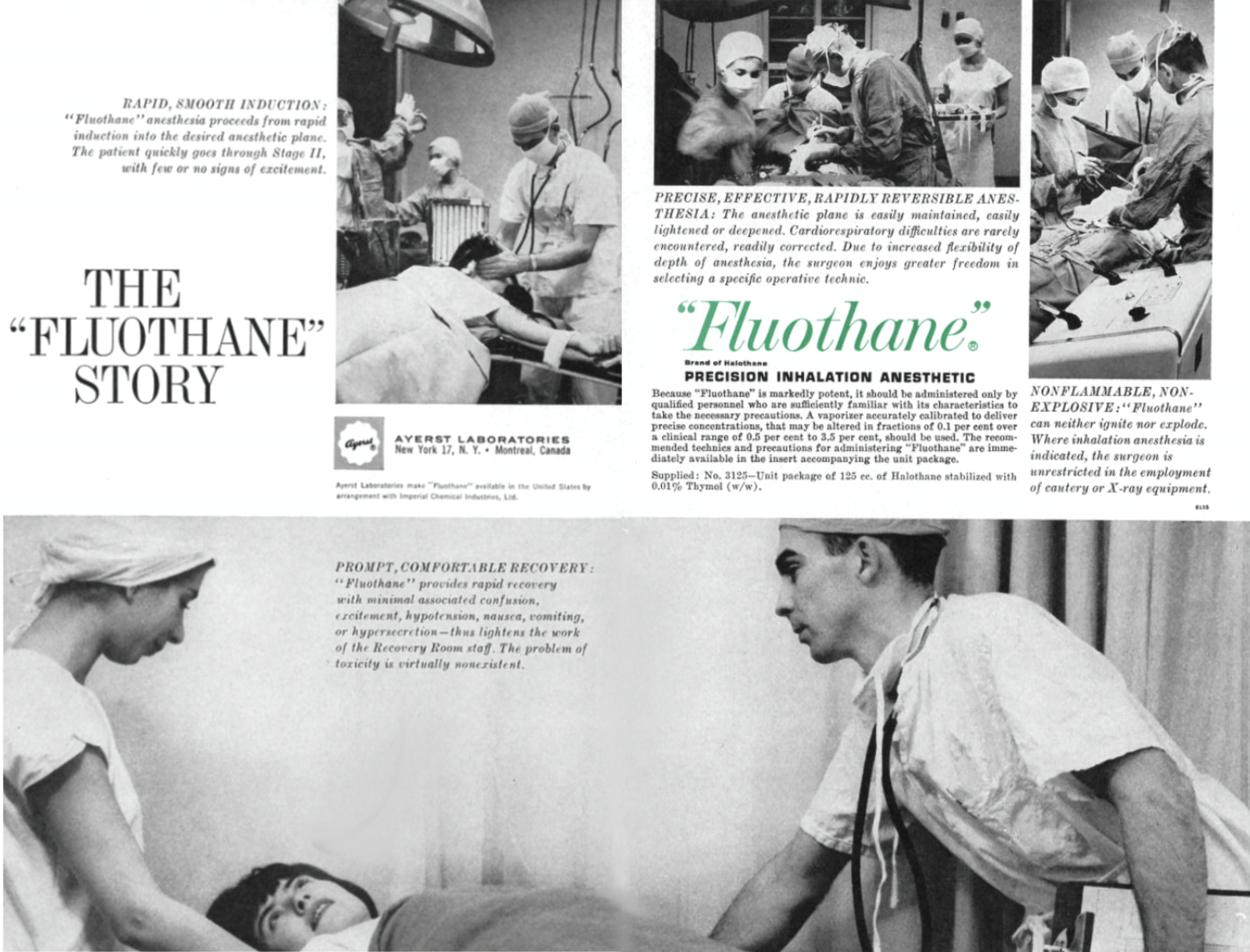
An advertisement for Fluothane, published in various American medical journals between 1961 and 1962.

Halothane was first synthesized by C. W. Suckling of Imperial Chemical Industries in 1951 at the ICI Widnes Laboratory and was first used clinically by M. Johnstone in Manchester in 1956. Initially, many pharmacologists and anaesthesiologists had doubts about the safety and efficacy of the new drug. But halothane, which required specialist knowledge and technologies for safe administration, also afforded British anaesthesiologists the opportunity to remake their speciality as a profession during a period, when the newly established National Health Service needed more specialist consultants. In this context, halothane eventually became popular as a nonflammable general anesthetic replacing other volatile anesthetics such as trichloroethylene, diethyl ether and cyclopropane. In many parts of the world it has been largely replaced by newer agents since the 1980s but is still widely used in developing countries because of its lower cost.

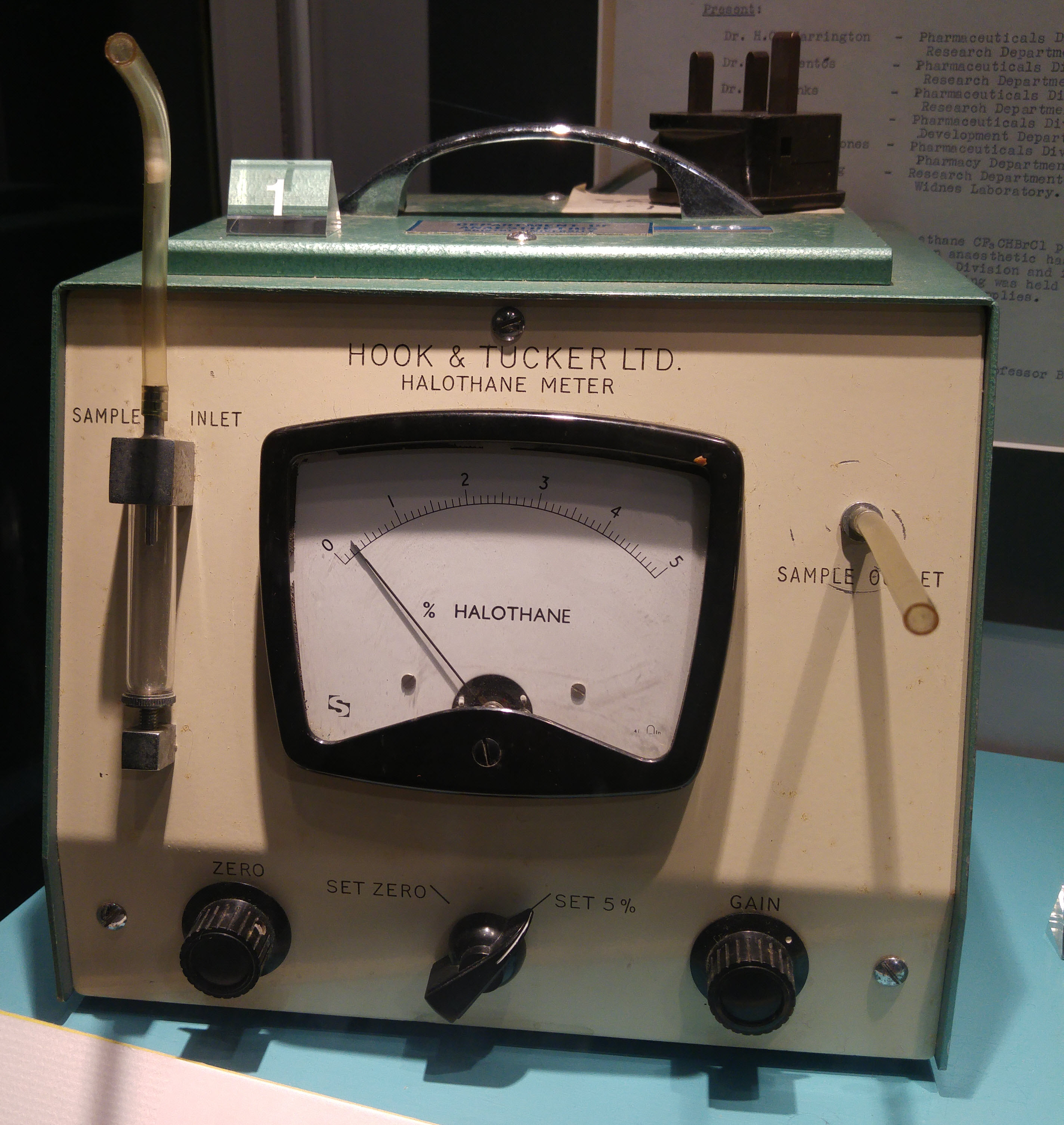
A meter for measuring halothane. This was used to measure the amount of halothane as flow of inspired gas during anesthesia.

Halothane was given to many millions of people worldwide from its introduction in 1956 through the 1980s. Its properties include cardiac depression at high levels, cardiac sensitization to catecholamines such as norepinephrine, and potent bronchial relaxation. Its lack of airway irritation made it a common inhalation induction agent in pediatric anesthesia. Its use in developed countries has been mostly replaced by newer anesthetic agents such as sevoflurane. It is not commercially available in the United States.

== Society and culture ==
=== Availability ===
Halothane is available as a volatile liquid, at 30, 50, 200, and 250 ml per container but in many developed nations is not available having been displaced by newer agents. A major producer of halothane for anesthetic purposes, Piramal Pharma, ceased production of halothane at the end of 2023 which has led to dwindling supplies.

It is the only inhalational anesthetic containing bromine, which makes it radiopaque. It is colorless and pleasant-smelling, but unstable in light. It is packaged in dark-colored bottles and contains 0.01% thymol as a stabilizing agent.

=== Greenhouse gas ===
Owing to the presence of covalently bonded fluorine, halothane absorbs in the atmospheric window and is therefore a greenhouse gas. However, it is much less potent than most other chlorofluorocarbons and bromofluorocarbons due to its short atmospheric lifetime, estimated at only one year vis-à-vis over 100 years for many perfluorocarbons. Despite its short lifespan, halothane still has a global warming potential 50 times that of carbon dioxide, although this is over 100 times smaller than the most abundant fluorinated gases, and about 800 times smaller than the GWP of sulfur hexafluoride over 500 years. Halothane is believed to make a negligible contribution to global warming.

=== Ozone depletion ===
Halothane is an ozone depleting substance with an ODP of 1.56 and it is calculated to be responsible for 1% of total stratospheric ozone layer depletion. Unlike most ozone depleting substances, it is not governed under the Montreal Protocol.
