= Enflurane =

Obsolete anaesthetic

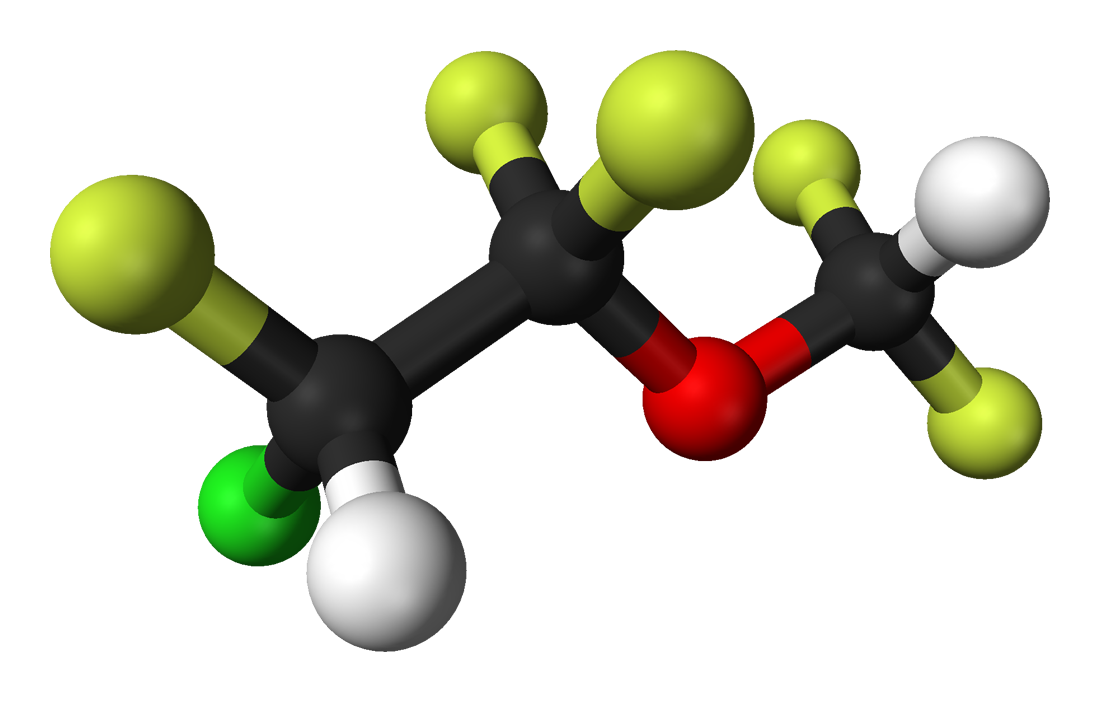

Clinical data
- AHFS/Drugs.com: Micromedex Detailed Consumer Information
- ATC code: N01AB04 (WHO)

Legal status
- Legal status: BR: Class C1 (Other controlled substances)

Pharmacokinetic data
- Protein binding: 97%

Identifiers
- IUPAC name: (RS)-2-chloro-1-(difluoromethoxy)-1,1,2-trifluoroethane
- CAS Number: 13838-16-9
- PubChem CID: 3226
- IUPHAR/BPS: 7175
- DrugBank: DB00228
- ChemSpider: 3113
- UNII: 91I69L5AY5
- KEGG: D00543
- ChEBI: CHEBI:4792
- ChEMBL: ChEMBL1257
- CompTox Dashboard (EPA): DTXSID1020562
- ECHA InfoCard: 100.034.126

Chemical and physical data
- Formula: C_{3}H_{2}ClF_{5}O
- Molar mass: 184.49 g·mol^{−1}
- 3D model (JSmol): Interactive image
- SMILES: FC(Cl)C(F)(F)OC(F)F
- InChI: InChI=1S/C3H2ClF5O/c4-1(5)3(8,9)10-2(6)7/h1-2H; Key:JPGQOUSTVILISH-UHFFFAOYSA-N

Enflurane (2-chloro-1,1,2-trifluoroethyl difluoromethyl ether) is a halogenated ether. Developed by Ross Terrell in 1963, it was first used clinically in 1966. It was increasingly used for inhalational anesthesia during the 1970s and 1980s but is no longer in common use.

Enflurane is a structural isomer of isoflurane. It vaporizes readily, but is a liquid at room temperature.

== Physical properties ==
Property	Value
Boiling point at 1 atm	56.5 °C
MAC	1.68
Vapor pressure at 20 °C	22.9 kPa (172 mm Hg)
Blood:gas partition coefficient	1.9
Oil:gas partition coefficient	98

== Pharmacology ==
The exact mechanism of the action of general anaesthetics has not been delineated. Enflurane acts as a positive allosteric modulator of the GABA_{A}, glycine, and 5-HT_{3} receptors, and as a negative allosteric modulator of the AMPA, kainate, and NMDA receptors, as well as of nicotinic acetylcholine receptors.

== Side effects ==
Clinically, enflurane produces a dose-related depression of myocardial contractility with an associated decrease in myocardial oxygen consumption. Between 2% and 5% of the inhaled dose is oxidised in the liver, producing fluoride ions and difluoromethoxy-difluoroacetic acid. This is significantly higher than the metabolism of its structural isomer isoflurane.

Enflurane also lowers the threshold for seizures, and should especially not be used on people with epilepsy. Like all potent inhalation anaesthetic agents it is a known trigger of malignant hyperthermia.

Like the other potent inhalation agents it relaxes the uterus in pregnant women, which is associated with more blood loss at delivery or other procedures on the gravid uterus.

The obsolete (as an anaesthetic) agent methoxyflurane had a nephrotoxic effect and caused acute kidney injury, usually attributed to the liberation of fluoride ions from its metabolism. Enflurane is similarly metabolised but the liberation of fluoride results in a lower plasma level and enflurane related kidney failure seemed unusual if seen at all.

== Occupational safety ==
The U.S. National Institute for Occupational Safety and Health (NIOSH) has set a recommended exposure limit (REL) for exposure to waste anaesthetic gas of 2 ppm (15.1 mg/m^{3}) over a 60-minute period. Symptoms of occupational exposure to enflurane include eye irritation, central nervous system depression, analgesia, anesthesia, convulsions, and respiratory depression.
