= Sevoflurane =

Inhalational anaesthetic

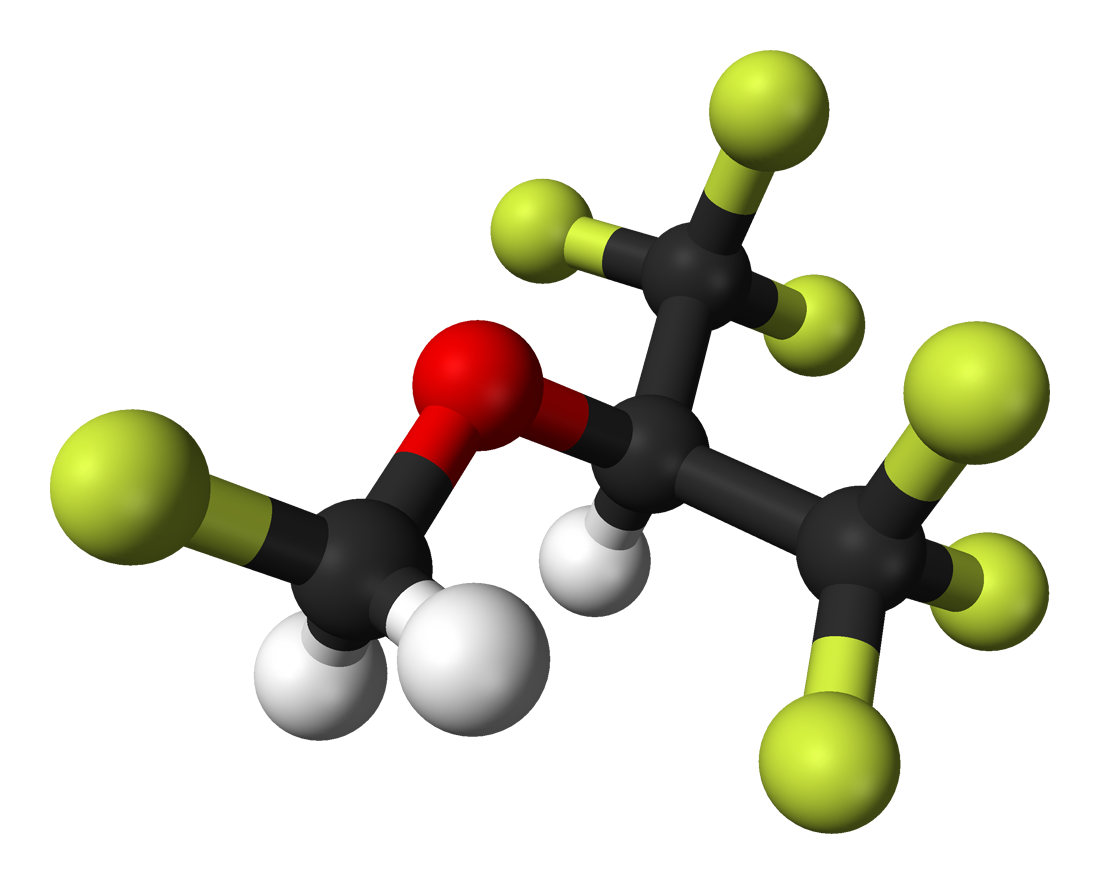

Clinical data
- Trade names: Sevorane, Ultane, others
- AHFS/Drugs.com: Micromedex Detailed Consumer Information
- Pregnancy category: AU: B2
- Routes of administration: Inhalation
- Drug class: Anesthetic
- ATC code: N01AB08 (WHO)

Legal status
- Legal status: AU: S4 (Prescription only); BR: Class C1 (Other controlled substances); CA: ℞-only; UK: POM (Prescription only); US: ℞-only; EU: Rx-only

Pharmacokinetic data
- Metabolism: Liver by CYP2E1
- Metabolites: Hexafluoroisopropanol
- Elimination half-life: 15–23 hours
- Excretion: Kidney

Identifiers
- IUPAC name: 1,1,1,3,3,3-Hexafluoro-2-(fluoromethoxy)propane
- CAS Number: 28523-86-6
- PubChem CID: 5206
- IUPHAR/BPS: 7296
- DrugBank: DB01236
- ChemSpider: 5017
- UNII: 38LVP0K73A
- KEGG: D00547
- ChEBI: CHEBI:9130
- ChEMBL: ChEMBL1200694
- CompTox Dashboard (EPA): DTXSID8046614
- ECHA InfoCard: 100.171.146

Chemical and physical data
- Formula: C_{4}H_{3}F_{7}O
- Molar mass: 200.056 g·mol^{−1}
- 3D model (JSmol): Interactive image
- Density: 1.53 g/cm^{3}
- Boiling point: 58.5 °C (137.3 °F)
- SMILES: FC(F)(F)C(OCF)C(F)(F)F
- InChI: InChI=1S/C4H3F7O/c5-1-12-2(3(6,7)8)4(9,10)11/h2H,1H2; Key:DFEYYRMXOJXZRJ-UHFFFAOYSA-N

Sevoflurane, sold under the brand name Sevorane, among others, and informally known as sevo, is a sweet-smelling, nonflammable, highly fluorinated methyl isopropyl ether used as an inhalational anaesthetic for induction and maintenance of general anesthesia.

It is on the World Health Organization's List of Essential Medicines.

== Medical uses ==
Sevoflurane is one of the most commonly used volatile anesthetic agents, particularly for outpatient anesthesia. Whether used alone or in conjunction with intravenous anesthetics such as propofol, it is the most commonly used inhaled anesthetic for induction and maintenance of general anesthesia in modern practice. While desflurane and isoflurane are also effective agents, sevoflurane has gained predominance due to decreased irritation to the airway and having a less pungent odor. It is often administered in a mixture of nitrous oxide and oxygen through a sevoflurane-specific calibrated vaporizer attached to an anesthesia machine.

Outside of the operating room, halogenated agents such as sevoflurane are a growing option for sedation in the intensive care unit (ICU). This is due to favorable pharmacokinetics of these agents over intravenous sedation such as bypassing hepatic and renal systems, rapid elimination via exhalation, and having no accumulation effect. However, sedation with inhaled anesthetics such as sevoflurane is not routinely used in North American ICUs currently because of limited experience with the agent among intensivists.

Sevoflurane also has the potential for use in managing patients with status asthmaticus that have failed other medical therapies with improvements in airway resistance and respiratory acidosis.

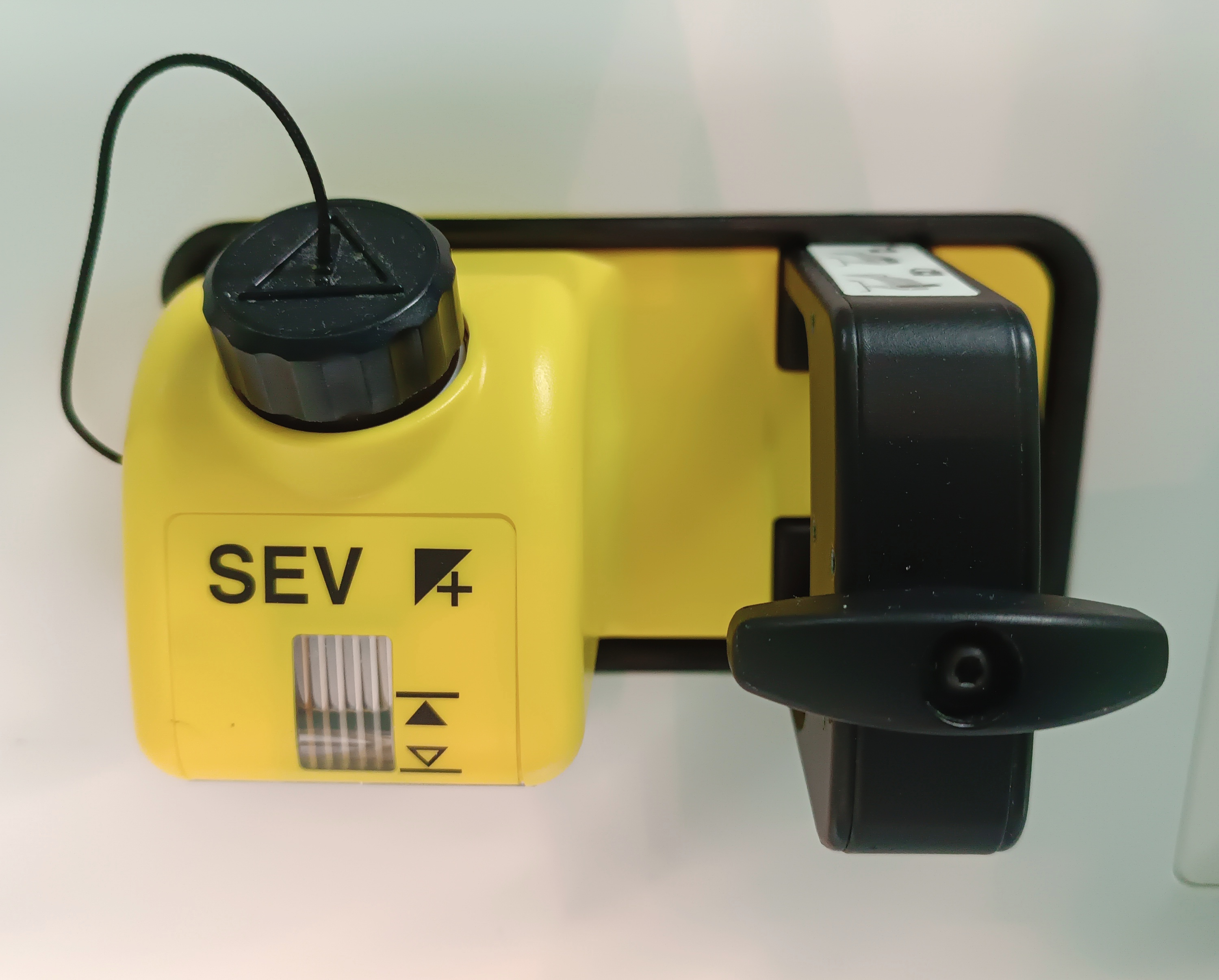
Cassette-based Vaporizer designed for Sevoflurane

== Contraindications ==
Similarly to other volatile anesthetics, sevoflurane should not be administered to any patient with known or suspected genetic susceptibility to malignant hyperthermia. Usage should also be avoided in patients with a known or suspected sensitivity to sevoflurane or other halogenated inhalational agents.

== Adverse effects ==
Sevoflurane has an excellent safety record, but is under review for potential hepatotoxicity, and may accelerate Alzheimer's. There were rare reports involving adults with symptoms similar to halothane hepatotoxicity. Deeper states of anesthesia with sevoflurane may also lead to generalized muscle spasm.

One of the most prominent adverse effects associated with volatile anesthetics such as sevoflurane is postoperative nausea and vomiting (PONV). Volatile anesthetics were shown to have a dose-dependent effect on PONV, particularly in the first 2-6 hours following surgery. Risk factors for PONV are multifactorial and include prior PONV, motion sickness, female sex, non-smoking status, age < 50 years, longer surgery duration, and use of postoperative opioids. In patients who are at increased risk for PONV, propofol-based total intravenous anesthesia may be preferable and is associated with decreased incidence of PONV.

In patients with pre-existing lung pathology, sevoflurane may precipitate coughing and laryngospasm. Sevoflurane is associated with a lower rate of adverse respiratory events such as coughing, airway irritation, stridor, laryngospasm, and respiratory distress relative to desflurane.

Sevoflurane is an inhaled anesthetic that is often used to induce and maintain anesthesia in children for surgery. During the process of awakening from the medication, it has been associated with a high incidence (>30%) of agitation and delirium in preschool children undergoing minor noninvasive surgery. It is not clear if this can be prevented.

Similarly to other inhaled anesthetics, sevoflurane is associated with a rare but life-threatening complication in susceptible individuals, malignant hyperthermia. This is a hypermetabolic response to volatile anesthetics and can present with hyperthermia, increased CO_{2} production, increased oxygen consumption, acidosis, hyperkalemia, tachycardia, tachypnea, muscle rigidity, and rhabdomyolysis. Treatment of an acute malignant hyperthermia consists of stopping the triggering agent, administering dantrolene, and providing supportive care.

Sevoflurane has been linked to severe neurological complications and even death in otherwise healthy persons, especially children, with the MT-ND4 11232T>C genetic anomaly. This anomaly originated in Venezuela and is at increased risk for those of Venezuelan ancestry. The genetic anomaly is not known to present with any other symptoms, so those with this mutation will not otherwise know that they are in this group. It is currently unknown if other anesthetics including other volatile anesthetics may by affected. This concern prompted the American Society of Anesthesiologists and the Society for Pediatric Anesthesia to issue a joint communication recommending screening for risk, genetic testing through Sanger Sequencing or Rapid Diagnostic Assay for the Sevoflurane Hypersensitivity, and avoiding the use of volatile anesthetics in those at risk until more information is available.

== Pharmacology ==
=== Pharmacodynamics ===
==== Mechanism of action ====
The exact mechanism of the action of general anaesthetics has not been delineated. Sevoflurane acts as a positive allosteric modulator of the GABA_{A} receptor in electrophysiology studies of neurons and recombinant receptors. However, it also acts as an NMDA receptor antagonist, potentiates glycine receptor currents, and inhibits nAChR and 5-HT_{3} receptor currents.

==== Physiological effects ====
Sevoflurane is a potent vasodilator. As such, it induces a dose dependent reduction in blood pressure and cardiac output. However, sevoflurane was not associated with an increase in heart rate compared to isoflurane and desflurane. Reduced myocardial oxygen demand and coronary vasodilation is also associated with sevoflurane usage. It reduces the ventilatory response to hypoxia and hypercapnia. Dose-response inhibition of hypoxic pulmonary vasoconstriction is also caused by volatile anesthetics like sevoflurane. The vasodilatory properties of sevoflurane also cause it to increase intracranial pressure and cerebral blood flow. However, it reduces cerebral metabolic rate.

=== Pharmacokinetics ===
After desflurane, sevoflurane is the volatile anesthetic with the fastest onset. While its offset may be faster than agents other than desflurane in a few circumstances, its offset is more often similar to that of the much older agent isoflurane. While sevoflurane is only half as soluble as isoflurane in blood, the tissue blood partition coefficients of isoflurane and sevoflurane are quite similar. For example, in the muscle group: isoflurane 2.62 vs. sevoflurane 2.57. In the fat group: isoflurane 52 vs. sevoflurane 50. As a result, the longer the case, the more similar will be the emergence times for sevoflurane and isoflurane. Sevoflurane has the lowest fat solubility among inhaled anesthetics.

Sevoflurane will degrade into what is most commonly referred to as compound A (fluoromethyl 2,2-difluoro-1-(trifluoromethyl)vinyl ether) when in contact with CO_{2} absorbents, and this degradation tends to enhance with decreased fresh gas flow rates, increased temperatures, and increased sevoflurane concentration. Compound A may be correlated with renal damage; while compound A has been shown to be nephrotoxic in animal models, clinically relevant kidney injury has not been demonstrated in humans.

== History ==
Sevoflurane was discovered by Ross Terrell alongside Louise Speers in the early 1960s researching at Airco Industrial Gases. Sevoflurane was concurrently synthesized by Richard Wallin. The rights for sevoflurane worldwide were held by AbbVie. It is available as a generic drug.

== Global-warming potential ==
Sevoflurane is a greenhouse gas. The twenty-year global-warming potential, GWP(20), for sevoflurane is 349, however this is significantly lower than isoflurane or desflurane.
