= Membrane-mediated anesthesia =

Anesthesia resulting from effects on the lipid membrane

Membrane-mediated anesthesia or anaesthesia (UK) is a mechanism of action that involves an anesthetic agent exerting its pharmaceutical effects primarily through interaction with the lipid bilayer membrane.

The relationship between volatile (inhalable) general anesthetics and the cellular lipid membrane has been well established since around 1900, based on the Meyer-Overton Correlation. Since 1900 there have been extensive research efforts to characterize these membrane-mediated effects of anesthesia, leading to many theories, but only recently did research experimentally demonstrated a promising mechanism of membrane-mediated anesthetic action for both general and Local anesthetics. These studies suggest that the anesthetic binding site in the membrane is within ordered lipids. This binding disrupts the function of the ordered lipids, forming lipid rafts that dislodge a membrane-bound phospholipase involved in a metabolic pathway that actives anesthetic-sensitive potassium channels. Other recent studies show similar lipid-raft-specific anesthetic effects on sodium channels.

See Theories of general anaesthetic action for a broader discussion of purely theoretical mechanisms.

== The Meyer-Overton Correlation for Anesthetics ==
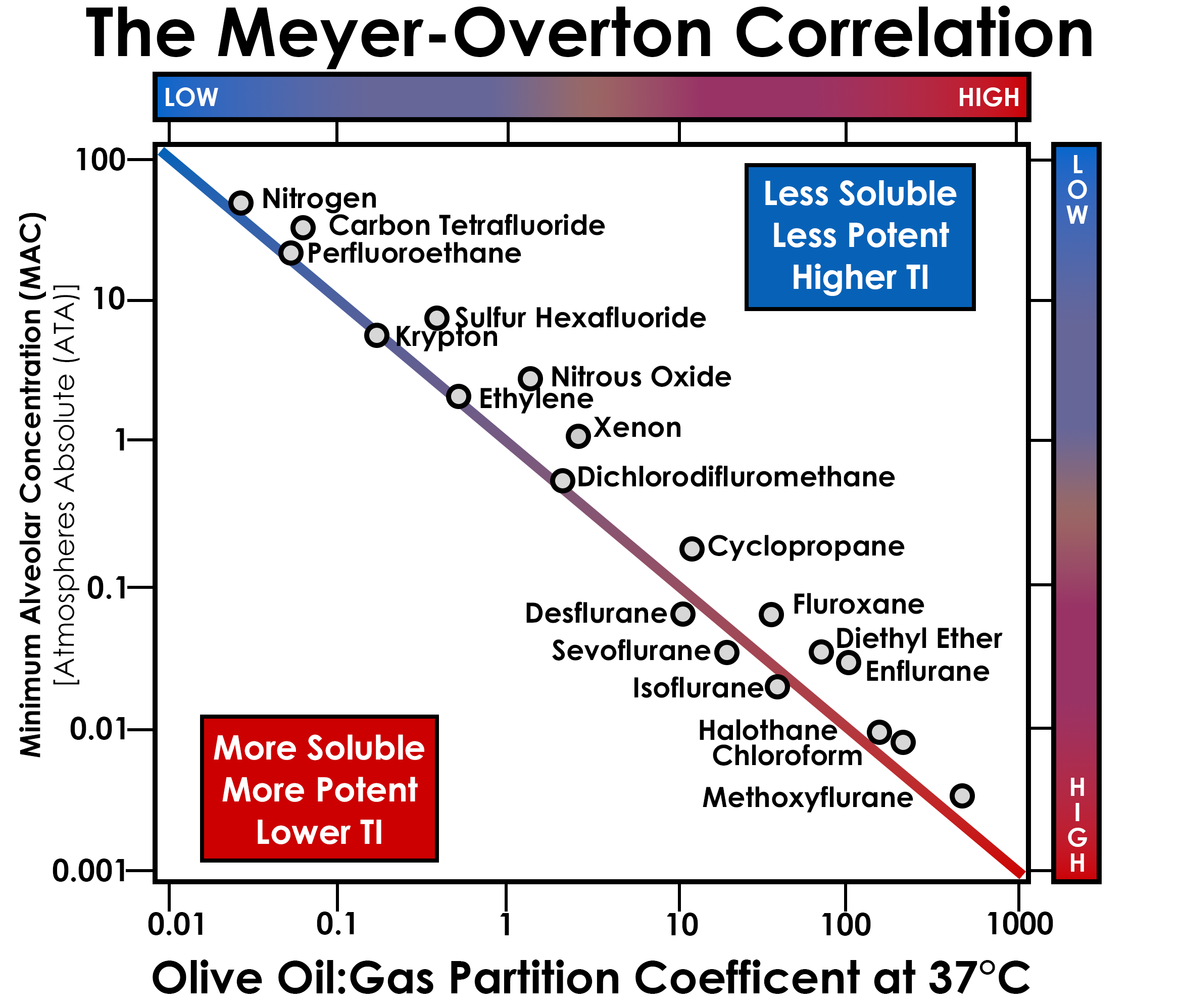

At the turn of the twentieth century, one of the most important anesthetic-based theories began to take shape. At the time, the research of both German pharmacologist Hans Horst Meyer (1899) and British-Swedish physiologist Charles Ernest Overton (1901) reached the same conclusion about general anesthetics and lipids:

There is a direct correlation between anesthetic agents and lipid solubility. The more lipophillic the anesthetic agent is, the more potent the anesthetic agent is.

This principle became known as the Meyer-Overton Correlation. It originally compared the anesthetic partition coefficient in olive oil (X-axis) to the effective dose that induced anesthesia in 50% (i.e., EC50) of the tadpole research subjects (Y-axis). Modern renditions of the Meyer-Overton plot usually compare olive oil partition coefficient of the Inhalational or Intravenous drug (X-axis) to the minimum alveolar concentration (MAC) or the effective dose 50 (i.e., ED50) of the anesthetic agent (Y-axis).

== General anesthetics ==
Inhaled anesthetics partition into the membrane and disrupt the function of ordered lipids. Membranes, like proteins, are composed of ordered and disordered regions. The ordered region of the membrane contains a palmitate binding site that drives the association of palmitoylated proteins to clusters of GM1 lipids (sometimes referred to as lipid rafts). Palmitate's binding to lipid rafts regulates the affinity of most proteins to lipid rafts.

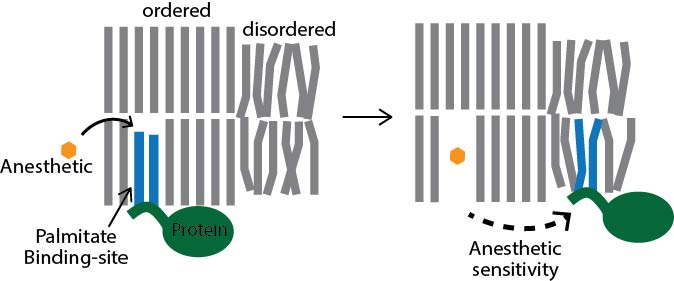
Anesthetic (orange) is shown competing with the palmitates (blue) of a palmitoylated protein (green). The displacement of the protein from the ordered lipids in the membrane (grey) renders the protein anesthetic sensitivity. The palmitate site is selective and structured similar to a protein despite being composed of lipids.

Inhaled anesthetics disrupt the binding of palmitate to GM1 lipids (see figure). The anesthetic binds to a specific palmitate site nonspecifically. The clusters of GM1 lipids persist, but they lose their ability to bind palmitoylated proteins.

=== PLD2 ===
Phospholipase D2 (PLD2) is a palmitoylated protein that is activated by substrate presentation. Anesthetics cause PLD2 to move from GM1 lipids, where it lacks access to its substrate, to a PIP2 domain which has abundant PLD2 substrate. Animals with genetically depleted PLD2 were significantly resistant to anesthetics. The anesthetics xenon, chloroform, isofluorane, and propofol all activate PLD in cultured cells.

=== TREK-1 ===
Twik-related potassium channel (TREK-1) is localized to ordered lipids through its interaction with PLD2. Displacement of the complex from GM1 lipids causes the complex to move to clusters. The product of PLD2, phosphatidic acid (PA) directly activates TREK-1. The anesthetic sensitivity of TREK-1 was shown to be through PLD2, and the sensitivity could be transferred to TRAAK, an otherwise anesthetic insensitive channel.

=== GABAAR ===
The membrane mediated mechanism is still being investigated. Nonetheless, the GABAAR gamma subunit is palmitoylated and the alpha subunit binds to PIP2. When the agonist GABA binds to GABAAR it causes a translocation to thin lipids near PIP2. Anesthetic disruption of Palmitate mediated localization should therefore cause the channel to move the same as an agonist, but this has not yet been confirmed.

=== Endocytosis ===
Endocytosis helps regulate the time an ion channel spends on the surface of the membrane. GM1 lipids are the site of endocytosis. The anesthetics hydroxychloroquine, tetracaine, and lidocaine blocked entry of palmitoylated protein into the endocytic pathway. By blocking access to GM1 lipids, anesthetics block access to endocytosis through a membrane-mediated mechanism.

== Local anesthetics ==
Local anesthetics disrupt ordered lipid domains and this can cause PLD2 to leave a lipid raft. They also disrupt protein interactions with PIP2.

== The Lateral Pressure Profile Theory ==
The Lateral Pressure Profile theory suggests that anesthetic agents partition into the lipid bilayer, increasing the horizontal (lateral) pressure on proteins imbedded in the membrane. The added pressure is thought to cause a conformational change in protein structure, forcing the neuronal channel into an open or closed state (e.g., hyperpolarization) that generates the Inhibitory state of general anesthesia in the central nervous system (CNS).

This is the first hypothesis to explain the correlations of anesthetic potency with lipid bilayer structural characteristics, describing both mechanistic and thermodynamic rationale for the effects of general anesthesia.

However, the theory was tested for an anesthetic effect and showed none. This suggests lateral pressure profiles are insufficient at least in the disordered region of the membrane to induce an anesthetic effect.

== History ==
More than 100 years ago, a unifying theory of anesthesia was proposed based on the oil partition coefficient. In the 70s this concept was extended to the disruption of lipid partitioning. Partitioning itself is an integral part of forming the ordered domains in the membrane, and the proposed mechanism is very close to the current thinking, but the partitioning itself is not the target of the anesthetics. At clinical concentration, the anesthetics do not inhibit lipid partitioning. Rather they inhibit the order within the partition and/or compete for the palmitate binding site. Nonetheless, several of the early conceptual ideas about how disruption of lipid partitioning could affect an ion channel have merit.
