= C23H20N6O =

The molecular formula C_{23}H_{20}N_{6}O may refer to:

- LGK974
- Mocetinostat
- Zipalertinib
