= DESI2 =

Protein-coding gene in humans

Identifiers
- Aliases: DESI2, C1orf121, DeSI-2, FAM152A, PNAS-4, PPPDE1, CGI-146, desumoylating isopeptidase 2
- External IDs: OMIM: 614638; MGI: 1926075; GeneCards: DESI2
Enzyme activity
EC #	BRENDA	ExPASy	KEGG	MetaCyc
3.1.2.22	↗	↗	↗	↗
3.4.19.12	↗	↗	↗	↗

Gene location (Human)
Chr.	Chromosome 1 (human)
Band	1q44	Start	244,653,103 bp
Band	1q44	End	244,709,033 bp

Gene location (Mouse)
Chr.	Chromosome 1 (mouse)
Band	1|1 H4	Start	178,014,983 bp
Band	1|1 H4	End	178,084,867 bp
RNA expression pattern
Bgee	Human / Mouse (ortholog); Top expressed in: secondary oocyte; pericardium; saphenous vein; superior surface of tongue; sperm; body of tongue; mucosa of pharynx; vena cava; lower lobe of lung; nipple / Top expressed in: zygote; secondary oocyte; quadriceps femoris muscle; tail of embryo; primary oocyte; skeletal muscle tissue; placenta; muscle of thigh; uterus; epiblast; More reference expression data
BioGPS	n/a
Gene ontology
Molecular function	peptidase activity; hydrolase activity; protein binding; thiol-dependent deubiquitinase; Lys63-specific deubiquitinase activity; Lys48-specific deubiquitinase activity
Cellular component	cytoplasm
Biological process	proteolysis; protein K63-linked deubiquitination; protein K48-linked deubiquitination
Sources:Amigo / QuickGO
Orthologs
Databases	NCBI: entry; OMA: entry
Species	Human	Mouse
Entrez	51029	78825
Ensembl	ENSG00000121644	ENSMUSG00000026502
UniProt	Q9BSY9	Q9D291
RefSeq (mRNA)	NM_001297746; NM_016076	NM_024282
RefSeq (protein)	NP_001284675; NP_057160	NP_077244
Location (UCSC)	Chr 1: 244.65 – 244.71 Mb	Chr 1: 178.01 – 178.08 Mb
PubMed search
- Wikidata
View/Edit Human	View/Edit Mouse

Desumoylating isopeptidase 2 is a protein that in humans is encoded by the DESI2 gene. Like DESI1, desumoylating isopeptidase 2 is a dual-function hydrolase enzyme that removes SUMOylation and S-palmitoylation post-translational modifications from target proteins. Desumoylating isopeptidase 2 also acts as a deubiquitinase on polyubiquitin chains.
