= Cholesterol signaling =

Cholesterol is a cell signaling molecule that is highly regulated in eukaryotic cell membranes. In human health, its effects are most notable in inflammation, metabolic syndrome, and neurodegeneration. At the molecular level, cholesterol primarily signals by regulating clustering of saturated lipids and proteins that depend on spatial biology and clustering for their regulation.

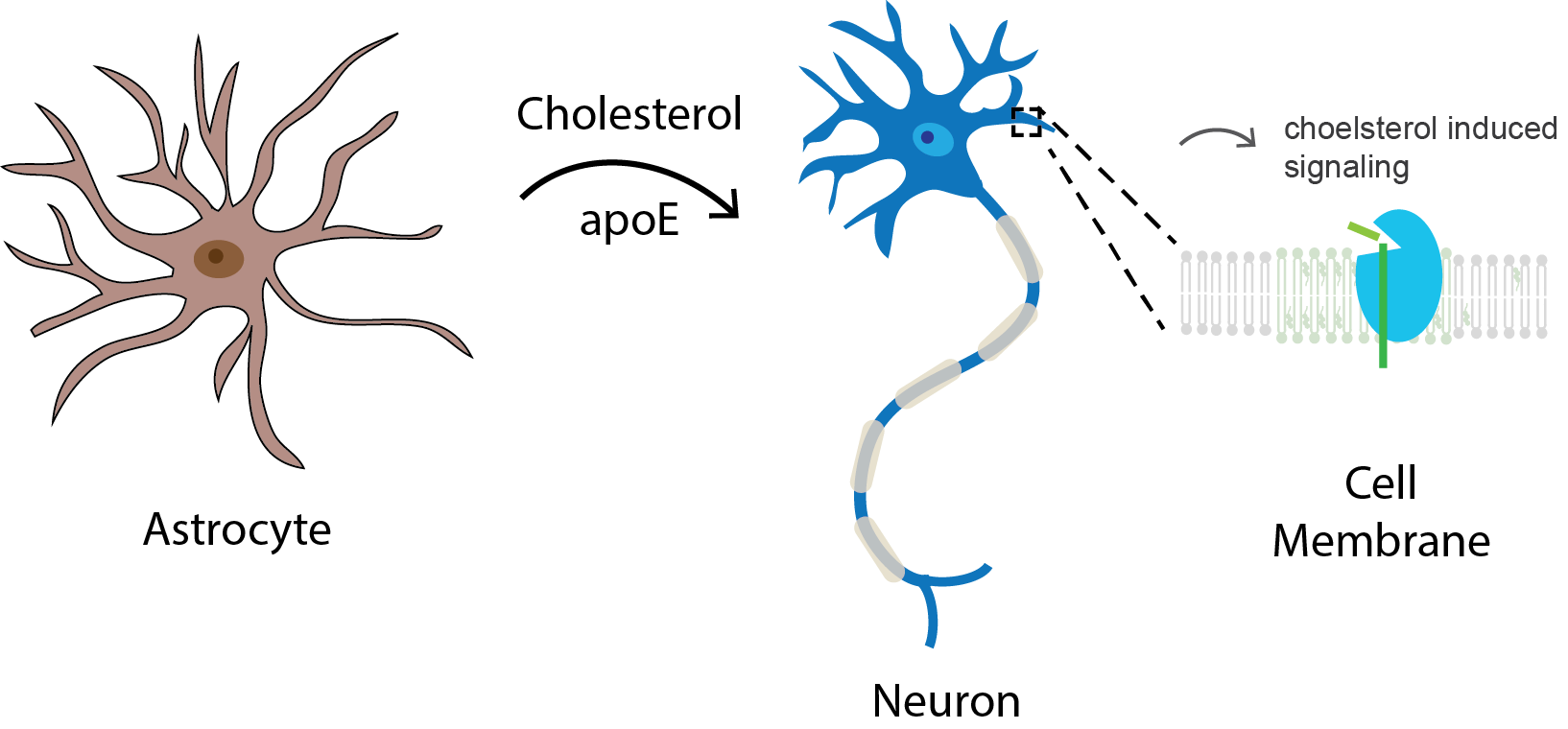
Cholesterol signaling (brain); Astrocyte cholesterol is exported to the neuron where it causes clustering of lipids. Clustering activates enzymes and other proteins by substrate presentation.

== Mechanism ==
Lipid rafts are loosely defined as clusters of cholesterol and saturated lipids forming regions of lipid heterogeneity in cellular membranes (e.g., the ganglioside GM1). The association of proteins to lipid rafts is cholesterol dependent and regulates the proteins' function (e.g., substrate presentation).

=== Lipid raft regulation ===
Cholesterol regulates the function of several membrane proteins associated with lipid rafts. It does so by controlling the formation or depletion of lipid rafts in the plasma membrane. The lipid rafts house the membrane proteins and forming or depleting the lipid rafts moves the proteins in or out of the raft environment, thereby exposing them to a new environment that can activate or deactivate the proteins. For example, cholesterol directly regulates the affinity of palmitoylated proteins for GM1 containing lipid rafts. Cholesterol signaling through lipid rafts can be attenuated by phosphatidylinositol 4,5-bisphosphate (PIP_{2}) signaling. PIP_{2} contains mostly polyunsaturated lipids that partition away from saturated lipids. Proteins that bind both lipid rafts and PIP_{2} are negatively regulated by high levels of PIP_{2}. This effect was observed with phospholipase D.

In the brain, astrocytes make the cholesterol and transport it to nerves to control their function. In this sense, cholesterol functions as a hormone.

=== Substrate presentation ===
A protein subject to regulation through raft-associated translocation can undergo activation upon substrate presentation. For instance, an enzyme that translocates within the membrane towards its substrate can be activated by localizing to the substrate, irrespective of any conformational changes in the enzyme itself.

== Protein ligand ==
In addition to lipid rafts, cholesterol can also interact with proteins that possess lipid-binding domains, such as certain types of sterol-sensing domains or cholesterol recognition/interaction amino acid consensus (CRAC) motifs. These interactions can affect protein conformation, stability, and function, thereby influencing various cellular processes like signal transduction, membrane trafficking, and enzyme activity. As a signaling lipid, cholesterol may act as a ligand.

=== Ion channels ===
Numerous ion channels undergo palmitoylation, a process where a lipid is covalently linked to a protein. Moreover, a significant subset of ion channels demonstrate a direct affinity for cholesterol binding. The regulation of ion channels by cholesterol can stem from both direct binding interactions and an indirect influence, facilitated by the localization of palmitoylated residues within lipid rafts. It's important to note that these two mechanisms are not mutually exclusive; they can concurrently contribute to the modulation of ion channel activity and localization.

The spatial arrangement of an ion channel can profoundly impact its activation potential. Proposed mechanisms for this phenomenon encompass alterations in membrane thickness and the concentration of lipid molecules critical for signaling. One instance of this is observed in TREK-1 channels, which transition between lipid rafts and PIP_{2} domains, where they interact with an activating lipid. Similarly, Kir2.1 channels experience inhibition due to cholesterol while being activated by PIP_{2}. Consequently, a transition from cholesterol-enriched GM1 to PIP_{2}-rich domains is anticipated to trigger channel activation. Conversely, the scenario is opposite for nAChR, which responds positively to cholesterol, eliciting its activation.

== GABAAR ==
Cholesterol regulation: Recent data shows cholesterol from astrocytes drives GABAAR to associate with ordered lipid domains in neurons. Cholesterol enhances max current and delays desensitization. In a disease model for Alzheimer's disease brain cholesterol was elevated and GABAAR shifted into GM1 clusters.

During GABAAR activation by the neurotransmitter GABA, the receptors shifts away from ordered cholesterol domains to PIP_{2} clusters. When the agonist is washed out the receptor shifts back to ordered cholesterol domains.

== Role in Disease ==
=== Alzheimer's Disease ===
In the brain, cholesterol is synthesized in astrocytes and transported to neurons with the cholesterol transport protein apolipoprotein E (apoE). The cholesterol controls the clustering of amyloid precursor protein with gamma secretase in GM1 lipid domains. High cholesterol induces APP hydrolysis and the eventual accumulation of amyloid plaques tau phosphorylation. The ApoE isotype4 is the greatest risk factor for sporadic Alzheimer's and this allele was shown to increase cholesterol in mice.

=== Inflammation ===
Cholesterol uptake by cells instigates inflammation, affecting both the central nervous system and the peripheral systems. This phenomenon involves the aggregation of inflammatory proteins. For instance, in the context of TLR4, cholesterol prompts receptor dimerization. Similarly, with TNF alpha, the substrate facilitates the enzyme's binding. Subsequent hydrolysis yields soluble cytokines, contributing to the inflammatory response.

During an inflammatory response cholesterol is loaded into immune cells including macrophages. The cholesterol is a signal that activates cytokine production and other inflammatory responses. Cholesterol's role in inflammation is central to many diseases.

=== Viral entry ===
Numerous viruses exploit lipid rafts and endocytosis as entry pathways. Notably, SARS-CoV-2 has been demonstrated to leverage heightened cholesterol levels stemming from an immune response, thereby amplifying endocytosis and infectivity. Moreover, tissue cholesterol levels tend to rise with age. This augmented cholesterol presence provides insight into the greater severity of COVID-19 in elderly and chronically ill patients.

=== Coronary Heart Disease ===
inflammation induced by cholesterol loading into immune cells causes heart disease. A class of drugs called statins blocks cholesterol synthesis and is used extensively in treating heart disease.

== Steroids ==
Cholesterol is precursor for steroid hormones including progestogens, glucocorticoids, mineralocorticoids, androgens, and estrogens.

== History ==
Brown and Goldstein discovered the LDL receptor and showed cholesterol is loaded into cells through receptor mediated endocytosis. Until recently cholesterol was thought of primarily as a structural component of the membrane. However, more recently, cholesterol uptake was shown to signal an immune response in macrophages. More importantly, the ability to efflux cholesterol through ABC transporters was shown to attenuate (i.e., shut down) the inflammatory response.
