= PIP2 domain =

PIP2 domains (also called PIP2 clusters) are a type of cholesterol-independent lipid domain formed from phosphatidylinositol and positively charged proteins in the plasma membrane. They tend to inhibit GM1 lipid raft function.

== Chemical properties ==
Phosphatidylinositol 4,5-bisphosphate (PIP2) is an anionic signaling lipid. Its polyunsaturated acyl chains exclude it from GM1 lipid rafts. The multiple negative charges on PIP2 are thought to cluster proteins with positive charges residing in the plasma membrane leading to nanoscale clusters. PIP3 is also clustered away from PIP2 and away from GM1 lipid rafts.

== Biological function ==
PIP2 domains inhibit GM1 domain function by attracting palmitoylated proteins away from GM1 lipid rafts. For this to occur, a protein must be both palmitoylated and bind PIP2. Presumably PIP2 could also antagonize PIP3 localization but this has not been shown directly.

=== PLD2 ===
Phospholipase D2 (PLD2) binds PIP2 and localizes with lipid rafts. Increases in cholesterol overcome PIP2 binding and sequester PLD2 into GM1 lipid rafts away from its substrate phosphatidylcholine. Efflux of cholesterol causes PLD2 to translocate to PIP2 domains where it is activated by substrate presentation. Both PIP2 signaling and cholesterol signaling regulate the enzyme.

=== ACE2 receptor ===
Angiotensin converting enzyme (ACE2) is regulated by PIP2 localization. The ACE2 enzyme is palmitoylated which drives the protein into GM1 lipids. The enzyme also bind to PIP2 which moves it out of the endocytic pathway. The drug hydroxychloroquine blocks ACE2 interaction with PIP2 in multiple cell types shifting its localization.

== Other ==
PIP2 binding proteins

- PH domain

PIP2/palmitate proteins

- GABAA receptor
