= Theories of general anaesthetic action =

How drugs induce reversible suppression of consciousness

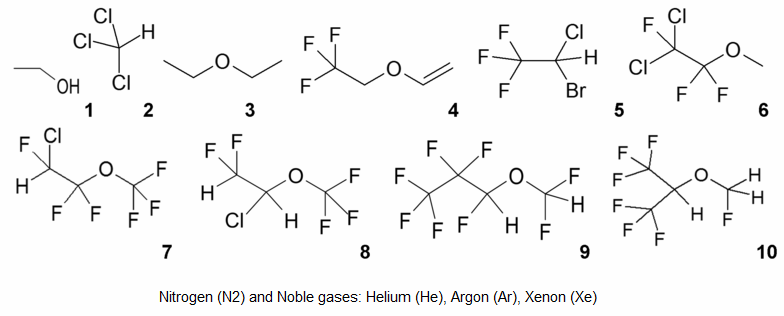
Structures of general anaesthetics widely used in medicine. 1 - ethanol, 2 - chloroform, 3 - diethyl ether, 4 - fluroxene, 5 - halothane, 6 - methoxyflurane, 7 - enflurane, 8 - isoflurane, 9 - desflurane, 10 - sevoflurane

A general anaesthetic (or anesthetic) is a drug that brings about a reversible loss of consciousness. These drugs are generally administered by an anaesthetist/anesthesiologist to induce or maintain general anaesthesia to facilitate surgery.

General anaesthetics have been widely used in surgery since 1842 when Crawford Long for the first time administered diethyl ether to a patient and performed a painless operation. It has long been believed that general anaesthetics exert their effects (analgesia, unconsciousness, immobility) through a membrane mediated mechanism or by directly modulating the activity of membrane proteins in the neuronal membrane. In general, different anaesthetics exhibit different mechanisms of action such that there are numerous non-exclusionary molecular targets at all levels of integration within the central nervous system. However, for certain intravenous anaesthetics, such as propofol and etomidate, the main molecular target is believed to be GABA_{A} receptor, with particular β subunits playing a crucial role.

The concept of specific interactions between receptors and drugs first introduced by Paul Ehrlich in 1897 states that drugs act only when they are bound to their targets (receptors). The identification of concrete molecular targets for general anaesthetics was made possible only with the modern development of molecular biology techniques for single amino acid mutations in proteins of genetically engineered mice.

== Lipid solubility-anaesthetic potency correlation (the Meyer-Overton correlation) ==
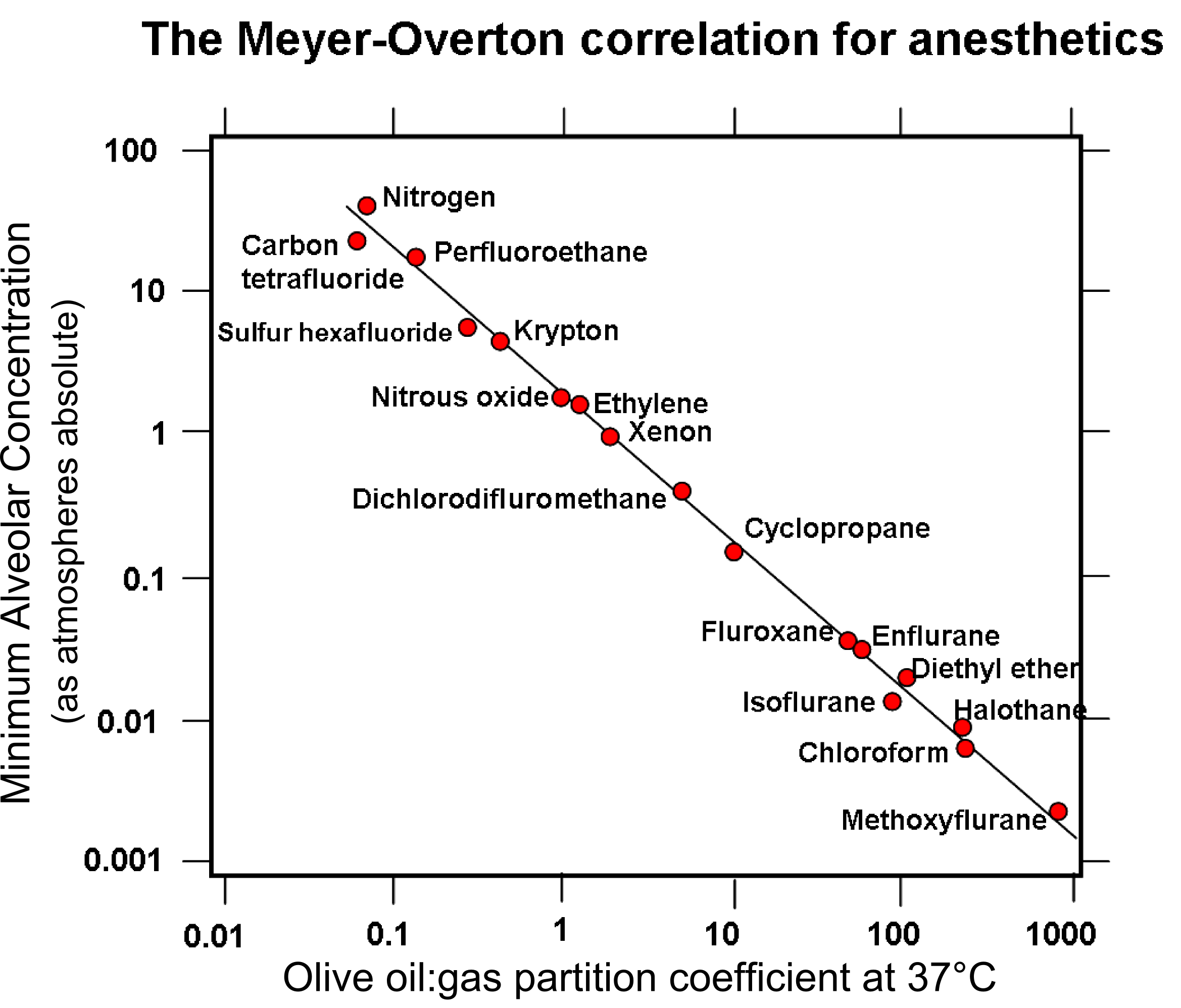
The Meyer-Overton correlation for anaesthetics

A nonspecific mechanism of general anaesthetic action was first proposed by Emil Harless and Ernst von Bibra in 1847. They suggested that general anaesthetics may act by dissolving in the fatty fraction of brain cells and removing fatty constituents from them, thus changing activity of brain cells and inducing anaesthesia. In 1899 Hans Horst Meyer published the first experimental evidence of the fact that anaesthetic potency is related to lipid solubility. Two years later a similar theory was published independently by Charles Ernest Overton.

Meyer compared the potency of many agents, defined as the reciprocal of the molar concentration required to induce anaesthesia in tadpoles, with their olive oil/water partition coefficient. He found a nearly linear relationship between potency and the partition coefficient for many types of anaesthetic molecules such as alcohols, aldehydes, ketones, ethers, and esters. The anaesthetic concentration required to induce anaesthesia in 50% of a population of animals (the EC_{50}) was independent of the means by which the anaesthetic was delivered, i.e., the gas or aqueous phase.

Meyer and Overton had discovered the striking correlation between the physical properties of general anaesthetic molecules and their potency: the greater the lipid solubility of a compound in olive oil, the greater its anaesthetic potency. This correlation is true for a wide range of anaesthetics with lipid solubilities ranging over 4-5 orders of magnitude if olive oil is used as the oil phase. This correlation can be improved considerably in terms of both the quality of the correlation and the increased range of anaesthetics if bulk octanol or a fully hydrated fluid lipid bilayer is used as the "oil" phase. It was also noted that volatile anaesthetics are additive in their effects. (A mixture of a half dose of two different volatile anaesthetics gave the same anaesthetic effect as a full dose of either drug alone.)

The best characterized anesthetics site accounting for the Meyer-Overton correlation resides in ordered lipid domains. Anesthetics adhere non-specifically to the surface of a palmitate specific binding site within the lipid membrane, displacing the palmitate from ordered GM1 lipids. The process gives rise to a component of membrane-mediated anesthesia. A similar mechanism was shown for luciferase. The anesthetics bound non-specifically to a hydrophobic surface and out-competed the specific binding of luciferin. However luciferase is not physiologically relevant to vertebrates as it is not endogenously expressed in vertebrates.

== Early lipid hypotheses of general anaesthetic action ==
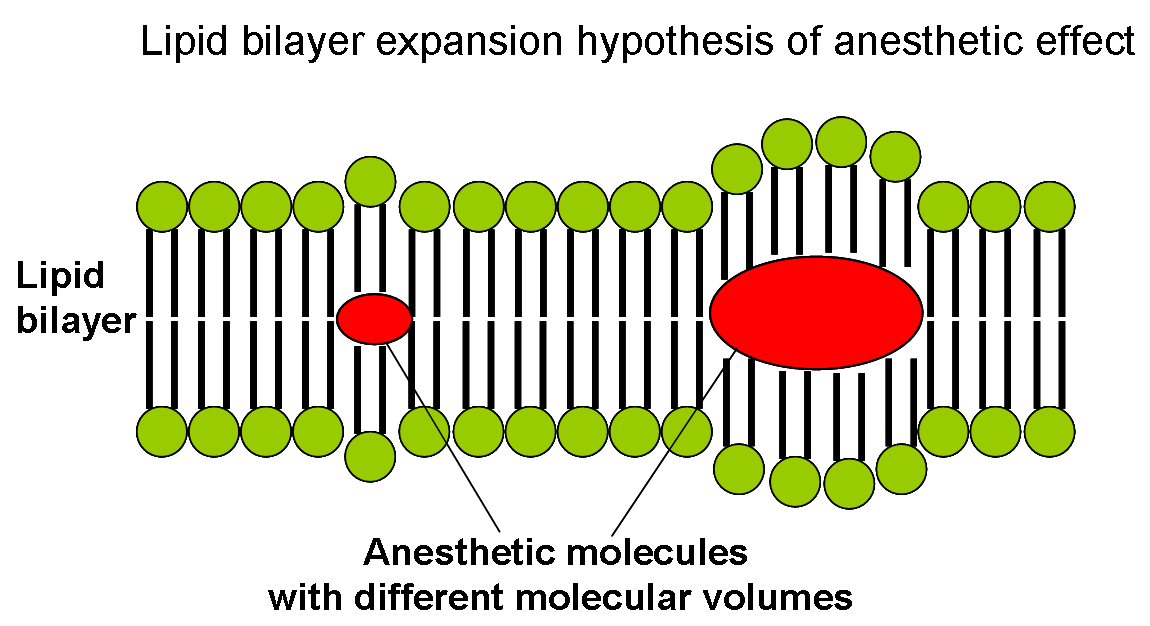
As bulky and hydrophobic anaesthetic molecules accumulate inside the neuronal cell membrane, this causes membrane distortion and expansion (thickening) due to volume displacement. Membrane thickening reversibly alters function of membrane ion channels thus providing anaesthetic effect. The actual chemical structure of the anaesthetic agent per se was not important, but its molecular volume plays the major role: the more space within membrane is occupied by anaesthetic, the greater is the anaesthetic effect.

From the correlation between lipid solubility and anaesthetic potency, both Meyer and Overton had surmised a unitary mechanism of general anaesthesia. They assumed that solubilization of lipophilic general anaesthetic in lipid bilayer of the neuron causes its malfunction and anaesthetic effect when critical concentration of anaesthetic is reached. Later in 1937 Miller and Smith suggested the critical volume hypothesis also called lipid bilayer expansion hypothesis. They assumed that bulky and hydrophobic anaesthetic molecules accumulate inside the hydrophobic (or lipophilic) regions of neuronal lipid membrane causing its distortion and expansion (thickening) due to volume displacement. Accumulation of critical amounts of anaesthetic causes membrane thickening sufficient to reversibly alter function of membrane ion channels thus providing anaesthetic effect. Actual chemical structure of the anaesthetic agent per se is not important, but its molecular volume plays the major role: the more space within membrane is occupied by anaesthetic - the greater is the anaesthetic effect. Based on this theory, in 1954 Mullins suggested that the Meyer-Overton correlation with potency can be improved if molecular volumes of anaesthetic molecules are taken into account. This theory existed for over 60 years and was supported by experimental fact that increases in atmospheric pressure reverse anaesthetic effect (pressure reversal effect).

Then other, physicochemical theories of anaesthetic action emerged that took into account the diverse chemical nature of general anaesthetics and suggested that anaesthetic effect is exerted through some perturbation of the lipid bilayer. Several types of bilayer perturbations were proposed to cause anaesthetic effect, including (1) changes in phase separation, (2) changes in bilayer thickness, (3) changes in order parameters, or (4) changes in curvature elasticity.

According to the lateral phase separation theory anaesthetics exert their action by fluidizing nerve membranes to a point when phase separations in the critical lipid regions disappear. This anaesthetic-induced fluidization makes membranes less able to facilitate the conformational changes in proteins that may be the basis for such membrane events as ion gating, synaptic transmitter release, and transmitter binding to receptors. More recent techniques with super resolution imaging show that the anesthetics do not overcome phase separation—the phase separation persists. Rather saturated lipids within the phase separation can undergo a transition from ordered to disordered which is dramatically affected by anesthetics. Nonetheless the concept of proteins moving between phase separated lipids in response to anesthetic has now been shown to be correct.

All these early lipid theories were generally thought to suffer from four weaknesses (full description with rebuttals see in sections below):

- Stereoisomers of an anaesthetic drug have very different anaesthetic potency whereas their oil/gas partition coefficients are similar.
- Certain drugs that are highly soluble in lipids, therefore expected to act as anaesthetics, exert convulsive effect instead (and therefore were called nonimmobilizers).
- A small increase in body temperature affects membrane density and fluidity as much as general anaesthetics, yet it does not cause anaesthesia.
- Increasing the chain length in a homologous series of straight-chain alcohols or alkanes increases their lipid solubility, but their anaesthetic potency stops increasing beyond a certain cutoff length.

The correlation between lipid solubility and potency of general anaesthetics was thought to be a necessary but insufficient condition for inferring a lipid target site. General anaesthetics could equally well be binding to hydrophobic target sites on proteins in the brain, but given the chemical diversity of anesthetics this would likely need to include more than one site and those sites would not inherently preclude a site in the membrane. For proteins, one reason that more polar general anaesthetics could be less potent is that they have to cross the blood–brain barrier to exert their effect on neurons in the brain.

== Modern lipid hypothesis ==
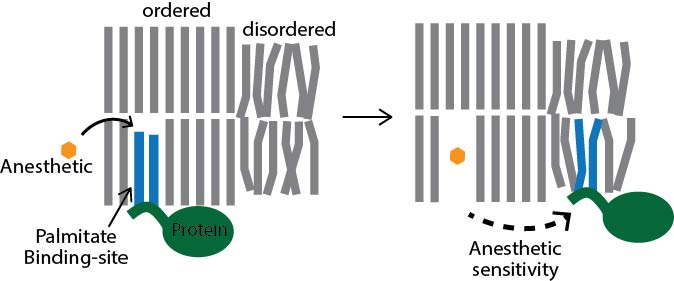
Anesthetic (orange) is shown competing with the palmitates (blue) of a palmitoylated protein (green). The displacement of the protein from the ordered lipids in the membrane (grey) renders the protein anesthetic sensitivity. The palmitate site is selective and structured similarly to a protein despite being composed of lipids.

There are two modern lipid hypotheses which are non-exclusionary with direct protein binding. The most recent hypothesis postulates that ordered lipids in the plasma membrane contain a structured binding site for the lipid palmitate. It is a lipid binding site within a lipid structure, not a protein structure. Proteins that contain a covalently attached palmitate (palmitoylation) are targeted to the ordered lipids through a specific lipid-lipid interaction. The binding of palmitate to the lipid domain is cholesterol dependent and the cell regulates the protein by nanoscopic localization.

Anesthetics work by binding non-specifically to the palmitate binding site, which disrupts the ability of the cholesterol to bind to and sequester the protein into an inactive state. This membrane mediated mechanism was demonstrated experimentally by Pavel and colleagues in 2020. They showed that the enzyme phospholipase D2 (PLD2) is anesthetic sensitive and activates the potassium channel TREK-1 through a membrane mediated mechanism. The anesthetics displaced PLD2 from ordered lipid domains, allowing the enzyme to be activated by substrate presentation and activate the channel.

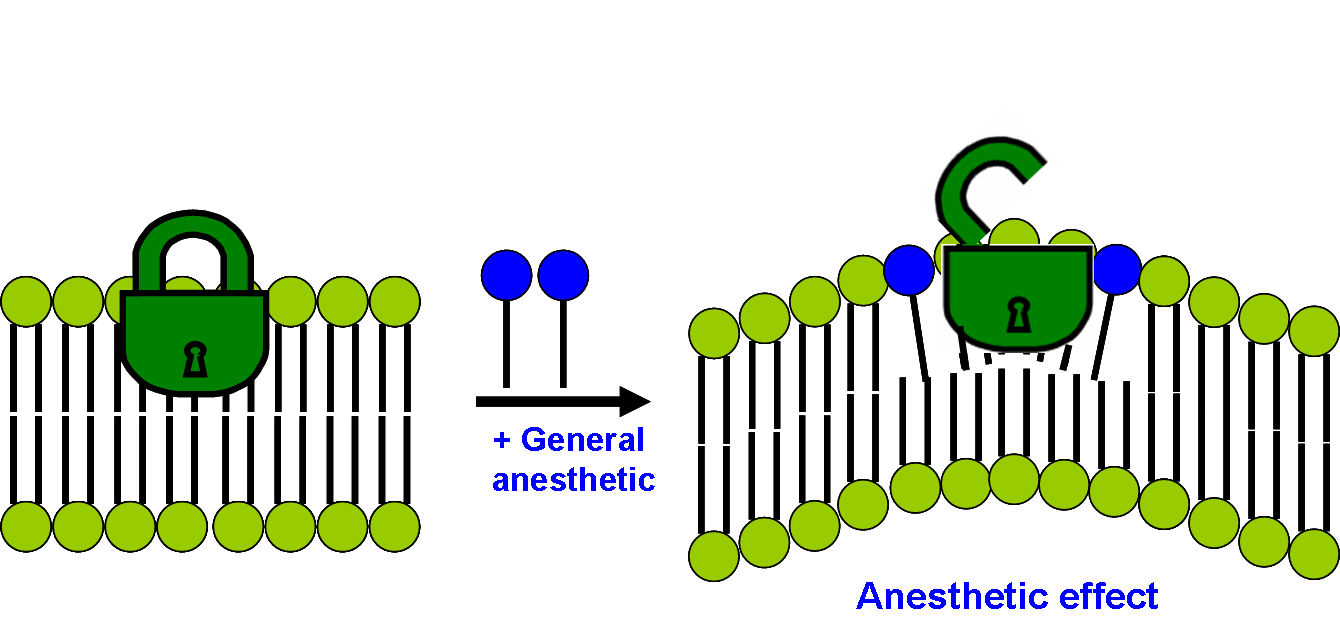
General anaesthetic changes membrane lateral pressure profile which determines conformation of membrane ion channel (green lock).

The second lipid hypothesis states that anaesthetic effect happens if solubilization of general anaesthetic in the bilayer causes a redistribution of membrane lateral pressures.

Each bilayer membrane has a distinct profile of how lateral pressures are distributed within it. Most membrane proteins (especially ion channels) are sensitive to changes in this lateral pressure distribution profile. These lateral stresses are rather large and vary with depth within the membrane. According to the modern lipid hypothesis a change in the membrane lateral pressure profile shifts the conformational equilibrium of certain membrane proteins known to be affected by clinical concentrations of anaesthetics such as ligand-gated ion channels. This mechanism is also nonspecific because the potency of the anaesthetic is determined not by its actual chemical structure, but by the positional and orientational distribution of its segments and bonds within the bilayer.

In 1997, Cantor suggested a detailed mechanism of general anesthesia based on lattice statistical thermodynamics. It was proposed that incorporation of amphiphilic and other interfacially active solutes (e.g. general anaesthetics) into the bilayer increases the lateral pressure selectively near the aqueous interfaces, which is compensated by a decrease in lateral pressure toward the centre of the bilayer. Calculations showed that general anaesthesia likely involves inhibition of the opening of the ion channel in a postsynaptic ligand-gated membrane protein by the following mechanism:

- A channel tries to open in response to a nerve impulse, thus increasing the cross-sectional area of the protein more near the aqueous interface than in the middle of the bilayer;
- Then the anaesthetic-induced increase in lateral pressure near the interface shifts the protein conformational equilibrium back to the closed state, since channel opening will require greater work against the higher pressure at the interface.

This is the first hypothesis that provided not just correlations of potency with structural or thermodynamic properties, but a detailed mechanistic and thermodynamic understanding of anaesthesia.

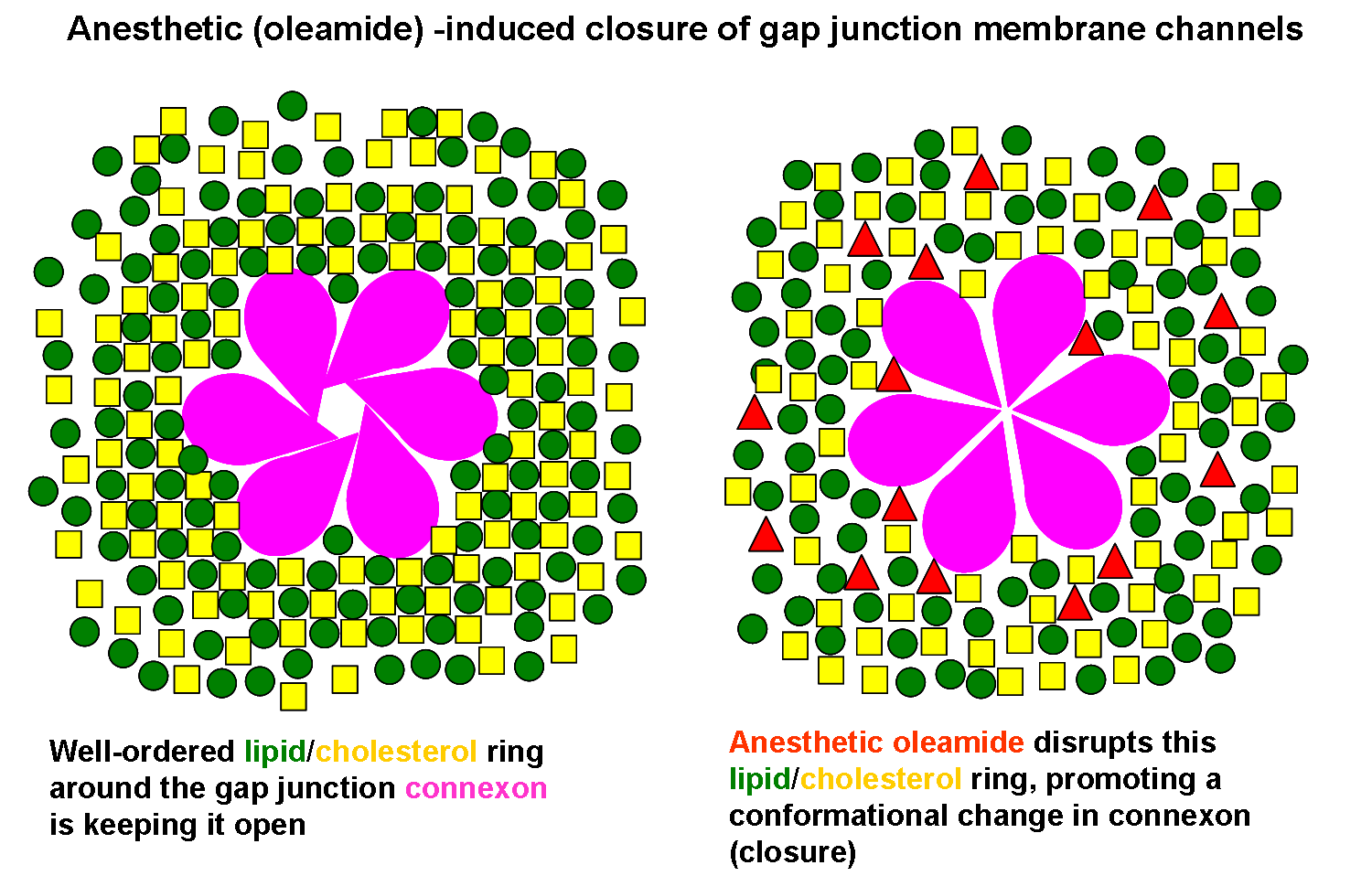

Thus, according to the modern lipid hypothesis anaesthetics do not act directly on their membrane protein targets, but rather perturb specialized lipid matrices at the protein-lipid interface, which act as mediators. This is a new kind of transduction mechanism, different from the usual key-lock interaction of ligand and receptor, where the anaesthetic (ligand) affects the function of membrane proteins by binding to the specific site on the protein. Thus some membrane proteins are proposed to be sensitive to their lipid environment.

A slightly different detailed molecular mechanism of how bilayer perturbation can influence the ion channel was proposed in the same year. Oleamide (fatty acid amide of oleic acid) is an endogenous anaesthetic found in vivo (in the cat's brain) and it is known to potentiate sleep and lower the temperature of the body by closing the gap junction channel connexion. The detailed mechanism is shown on the picture: the well-ordered lipid(green)/cholesterol(yellow) ring that exists around connexon (magenta) becomes disordered on treatment with anaesthetic (red triangles), promoting a closure of the connexon ion channel. This decreases brain activity and induces lethargy and anaesthetic effect.

Recently super resolution imaging showed direct experimental evidence that volatile anesthetics disrupt the ordered lipid domains as predicted. In the same study, a related mechanism emerged where the anesthetics released the enzyme phospholipase D (PLD) from lipid domains and the enzyme bound to and activated TREK-1 channels by the production of phosphatidic acid. These results showed experimentally that the membrane is a physiologically relevant target of general anesthetics.

== Membrane protein hypothesis of general anaesthetic action ==
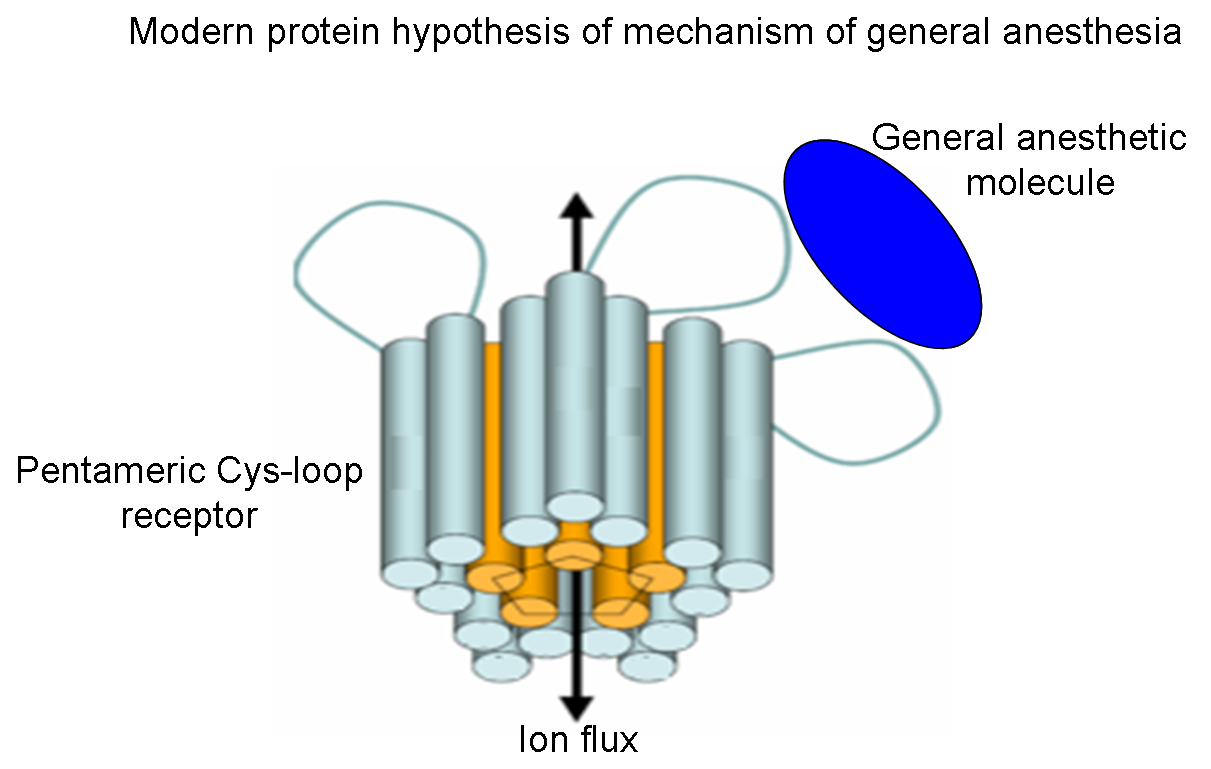
Inhaled general anaesthetics frequently do not change structure of their target protein (of Cys-loop receptor here) but change its dynamics especially dynamics in the flexible loops that connect α-helices in a bundle thus disrupting modes of motion essential for the protein function.

In the early 1980s, Nicholas P. Franks and William R. Lieb demonstrated that the Meyer-Overton correlation can be reproduced using a soluble protein. They found that two classes of proteins are inactivated by clinical doses of anaesthetic in the total absence of lipids. These are luciferases, which are used by bioluminescent animals and bacteria to produce light, and cytochrome P450, which is a group of heme proteins that hydroxylate a diverse group of compounds, including fatty acids, steroids, and xenobiotics such as phenobarbital. Remarkably, inhibition of these proteins by general anaesthetics was directly correlated with their anaesthetic potencies. Luciferase inhibition also exhibits a long-chain alcohol cutoff, which is related to the size of the anaesthetic-binding pocket.

These observations were important because they demonstrated that general anaesthetics exert their effect non-specifically including when binding to proteins. This also opened up the possibility that anesthetics could work through direct binding to proteins, rather than affect membrane proteins indirectly through nonspecific interactions with lipid bilayer as mediator. It was shown that anaesthetics alter the functions of many cytoplasmic signalling proteins, including protein kinase C.

However, the proteins considered the most likely molecular targets of anaesthetics are ion channels. According to this theory general anaesthetics are much more selective than in the lipid hypotheses, and they bind directly only to a small number of targets in the central nervous system, mostly ligand-gated ion channels in synapses and G-protein coupled receptors, altering their ion flux. Particularly Cys-loop receptors are plausible targets for general anaesthetics that bind at the interface between the subunits. The Cys-loop receptor superfamily includes inhibitory receptors (GABA_{A} receptors, GABA_{C} receptors, glycine receptors) and excitatory receptors (nicotinic acetylcholine receptor and 5-HT3 serotonin receptor). General anaesthetics can inhibit the channel functions of excitatory receptors or potentiate functions of inhibitory receptors, respectively.

The location of non-specific binding sites in ion channels is still a major question in the field. In particular, how does a compound that follows Overton-Meyer directly cause a conformational change in the protein? Typically, allosteric regulation involves a change in protein shape that accommodates the binding of the ligand. This mechanism is distinct from the luciferase mechanism. A second important question, how are the non-specific protein binding sites conserved across species and why do they generally inhibit excitatory receptors and potentiate inhibitory receptors?

A number of experimental and computational studies have shown that general anaesthetics could alter the dynamics in the flexible loops that connect α-helices in a bundle and are exposed to the membrane-water interface of Cys-loop receptors. The main binding pockets of general anaesthetics, however, are located within transmembrane four-α-helix bundles of Cys-loop receptors.

== GABA_{A} receptor as a major target of general anaesthetics ==
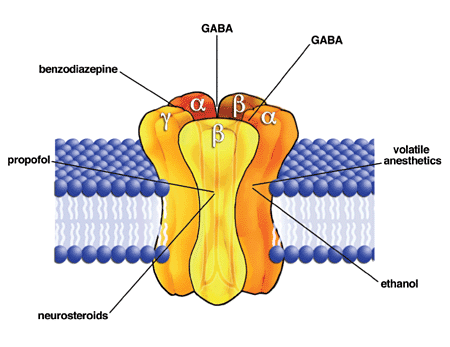
GABA_{A} receptor and where various ligands bind

The GABA_{A} receptor (GABA_{A}R) is an ionotropic receptor activated by the inhibitory neurotransmitter γ-aminobutyric acid (GABA). Activation of the GABA_{A} receptor leads to an influx of chloride ions, which causes hyperpolarization of the neuronal membranes.

The GABA_{A} receptor has historically been investigated as a major target of intravenous anesthetics such as propofol and etomidate. The binding site of propofol on mammalian GABA_{A} receptors has been identified by photolabeling using a diazirine derivative. Strong activation of tonic GABA_{A} receptor conductance by clinical concentrations of propofol has been confirmed with electrophysiological recordings from hippocampal CA1 neurons in adult rat brain slices.

GABA_{A} receptors that contain β3-subunits are the main molecular targets for the anesthetic actions of etomidate, whereas the β2-containing GABA_{A} receptors are involved in the sedation elicited by this drug. Electrophysiological experiments with amnestic concentrations of etomidate have also shown enhancement of tonic GABA_{A} conductance of CA1 pyramidal neurons in hippocampal slices.

Potent activation of GABA_{A} receptor-mediated inhibition with resulting strong depression of firing rates of neocortical neurons has also been demonstrated for clinical concentrations of volatile anesthetics such as isoflurane, enflurane and halothane.

== Other molecular targets ==
Enhancement of GABA_{A} receptor activity is very unlikely to be the sole mechanism underlying the wide range of behavioural effects of general anaesthetics. Most anaesthetic agents are in fact highly "promiscuous", i.e., they bind non-selectively to several receptor targets with similar potency. Notably, propofol, often described as a "GABAergic" agent, shows higher potency at nicotinic acetylcholine receptors (nAChR) and hyperpolarization-activated cyclic nucleotide-gated (HCN) channels than at GABA_{A}R. Accumulating experimental data suggest that modulation of non-GABA_{A}R targets (such as two-pore domain potassium channels, voltage-gated sodium channels, etc.) can account for some anaesthetic effects. For some agents (mainly ketamine, xenon, and nitrous oxide), inhibition of glutamate-gated N-methyl-D-aspartate receptors (NMDAR) is said to be the primary mechanism of action (with little to no effect on GABA_{A}R).

== Historical objections to the early lipid hypotheses ==
=== 1. Stereoisomers of an anaesthetic drug ===
Stereoisomers that represent mirror images of each other are termed enantiomers or optical isomers (for example, the isomers of R-(+)- and S-(−)-etomidate). Physicochemical effects of enantiomers are always identical in an achiral environment (for example in the lipid bilayer). However, in vivo enantiomers of many general anaesthetics (e.g. isoflurane, thiopental, etomidate) can differ greatly in their anaesthetic potency despite the similar oil/gas partition coefficients. For example, the R-(+) isomer of etomidate is 10 times more potent anaesthetic than its S-(-) isomer. This means that optical isomers partition identically into lipid, but have differential effects on ion channels and synaptic transmission. This objection provides a compelling evidence that the primary target for anaesthetics is not the achiral lipid bilayer itself but rather stereoselective binding sites on membrane proteins that provide a chiral environment for specific anaesthetic-protein docking interactions.

Rebuttal to the objection: 1) Stereo selective transport of the anesthetic was never considered. Anesthetics are hydrophobic and transported bound to proteins in the blood. Any stereo selective binding to the transport protein would change the concentration at the site of action. Furthermore a protein sink in the membrane could bind one of the isomers slightly better and reduce the effective concentration the membrane experiences. All stereo isomers are effective anesthetics, they only shifted the sensitivity, suggesting selective transport and selective protein sinks need to be considered. 2) Lipids are chiral, the same as proteins. And like proteins, lipids have ordered and disordered regions. The field failed to investigate the chirality of ordered lipids due to a lack of knowledge of their existence.

=== 2. Nonimmobilizers ===
All general anaesthetics induce immobilization (absence of movement in response to noxious stimuli) through depression of spinal cord functions, whereas their amnesic actions are exerted within the brain. According to the Meyer-Overton correlation the anaesthetic potency of the drug is directly proportional to its lipid solubility, however, there are many compounds that do not satisfy this rule. These drugs are strikingly similar to potent general anaesthetics and are predicted to be potent anaesthetics based on their lipid solubility, but they exert only one constituent of the anaesthetic action (amnesia) and do not suppress movement (i.e. do not depress spinal cord functions) as all anaesthetics do. These drugs are referred to as nonimmobilizers. The existence of nonimmobilizers suggests that anaesthetics induce different components of anaesthetic effect (amnesia and immobility) by affecting different molecular targets and not just the one target (neuronal bilayer) as it was believed earlier. An example of non-immobilizers are halogenated alkanes that are very hydrophobic, but fail to suppress movement in response to noxious stimulation at appropriate concentrations. See also: flurothyl.

==== Rebuttal to the objection ====
This is a logical fallacy. The hypothesis does not require that every molecule ever tested obeys the hypothesis for the hypothesis to be true. The existence of less than 10-20 related compounds that are known to disobey the Meyer-Overton hypothesis in no way negates the hundreds if not thousands of chemically diverse compounds that do obey the Overton-Meyer hypothesis. Exceptions can exist for reasons unrelated to the mechanism underlying the Meyer-Overton hypothesis.

=== 3. Temperature increases do not have anaesthetic effect ===
Experimental studies have shown that general anaesthetics including ethanol are potent fluidizers of natural and artificial membranes. However, changes in membrane density and fluidity in the presence of clinical concentrations of general anaesthetics are so small that relatively small increases in temperature (~1 °C) can mimic them without causing anaesthesia. The change in body temperature of approximately 1 °C is within the physiological range and clearly it is not sufficient to induce loss of consciousness per se. Thus membranes are fluidized only by large quantities of anaesthetics, but there are no changes in membrane fluidity when concentrations of anaesthetics are small and restricted to be pharmacologically relevant.

Rebuttal to the objection: Early studies only considered the fluidity of the bulk lipid membrane. Recent work has shown that temperature changes can occur over several degrees in ordered nanoscopic lipid domains. Furthermore, fluidity is actively regulated by fatty acid desaturases. And lastly, competition of anesthetics with palmitoylated proteins occurs independent of temperature and despite increased ordered lipids.

=== 4. Effect vanishes beyond a certain chain length ===
According to the Meyer-Overton correlation, in a homologous series of any general anaesthetic (e.g. n-alcohols, or alkanes), increasing the chain length increases the lipid solubility, and thereby should produce a corresponding increase in anaesthetic potency. However, beyond a certain chain length the anaesthetic effect disappears. For the n-alcohols, this cutoff occurs at a carbon chain length of about 13 and for the n-alkanes at a chain length of between 6 and 10, depending on the species.

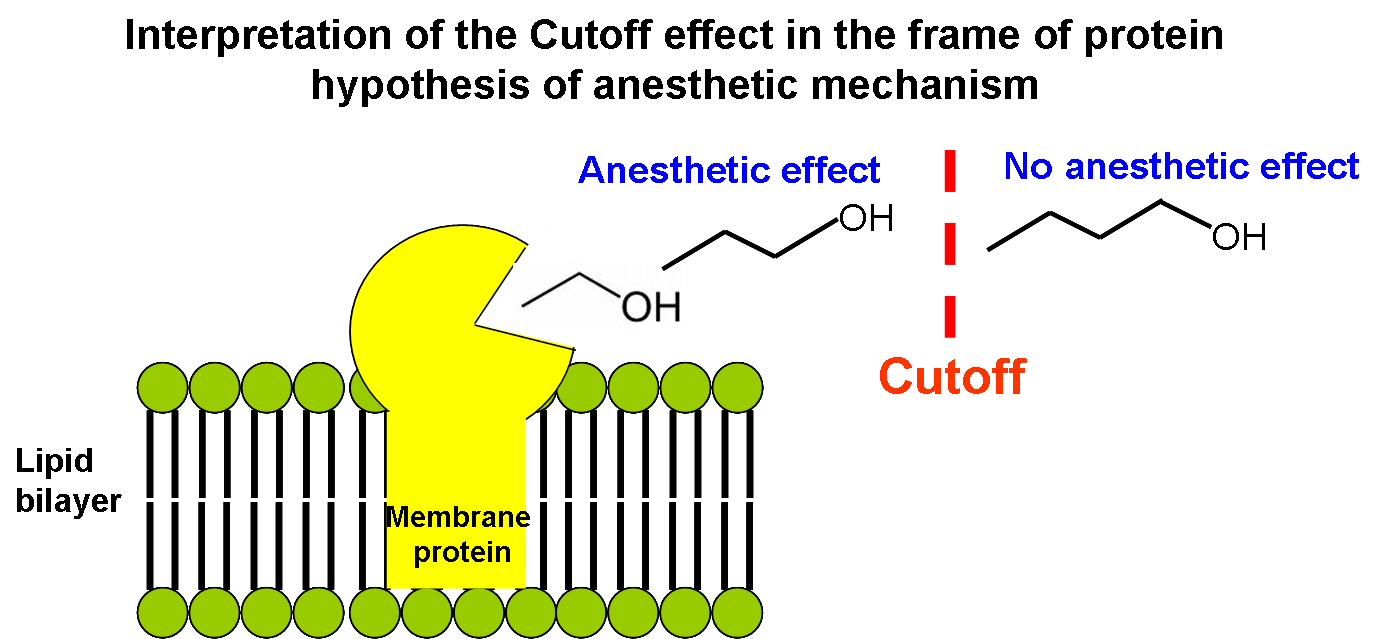
The Meyer-Overton rule predicts the constant increase of anaesthetic potency of n-alkanols with increasing chain length. However, above certain length the potency vanishes.

If general anaesthetics disrupt ion channels by partitioning into and perturbing the lipid bilayer, then one would expect that their solubility in lipid bilayers would also display the cutoff effect. However, partitioning of alcohols into lipid bilayers does not display a cutoff for long-chain alcohols from n-decanol to n-pentadecanol. A plot of chain length vs. the logarithm of the lipid bilayer/buffer partition coefficient K is linear, with the addition of each methylene group causing a change in the Gibbs free energy of -3.63 kJ/mol.

The cutoff effect was first interpreted as evidence that anaesthetics exert their effect not by acting globally on membrane lipids but rather by binding directly to hydrophobic pockets of well-defined volumes in proteins. As the alkyl chain grows, the anaesthetic fills more of the hydrophobic pocket and binds with greater affinity. When the molecule is too large to be entirely accommodated by the hydrophobic pocket, the binding affinity no longer increases with increasing chain length. Thus the volume of the n-alkanol chain at the cutoff length provides an estimate of the binding site volume. This objection provided the basis for protein hypothesis of anaesthetic effect (see below).

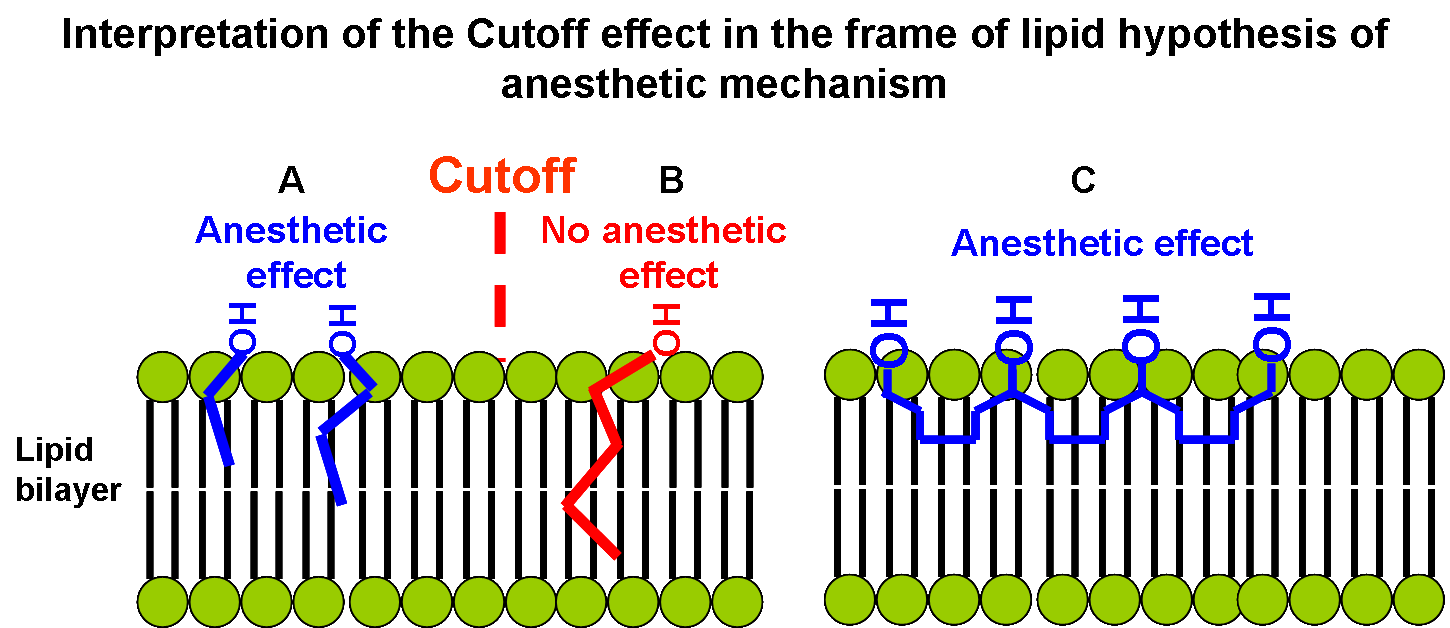
A) Short hydrocarbon chains are relatively rigid in terms of conformational enthropy and are close to alkanol hydroxyl group ("buoy") tethered to the interface. This makes short chain alkanols efficient mediators that redistribute lateral stress from membrane interior to its interface. B) This ability decreases in the row of n-alkanols since longer chains are more flexible and are not so tightly tethered to the hydroxyl group. C) Polyhydroxyalkanes 1,6,11,16-hexadecanetetraol and 2,7,12,17-octadecanetetraol exhibit significant anaesthetic potency as was predicted by cutoff effect because the length of the hydrocarbon chain between hydroxyl groups is smaller than the cutoff.

However, cutoff effect can still be explained in the frame of lipid hypothesis. In short-chain alkanols (A) segments of the chain are rather rigid (in terms of conformational enthropy) and very close to hydroxyl group tethered to aqueous interfacial region ("buoy"). Consequently, these segments efficiently redistribute lateral stresses from the bilayer interior toward the interface. In long-chain alkanols (B) hydrocarbon chain segments are located further from hydroxyl group and are more flexible than in short-chain alkanols. Efficiency of pressure redistribution decreases as the length of hydrocarbon chain increases until anaesthetic potency is lost at some point. It was proposed that polyalkanols (C) will have anaesthetic effect similar to short-chain 1-alkanols if the chain length between two neighbouring hydroxyl groups is smaller than the cutoff. This idea was supported by the experimental evidence because polyhydroxyalkanes 1,6,11,16-hexadecanetetraol and 2,7,12,17-octadecanetetraol exhibited significant anaesthetic potency as was originally proposed.

Rebuttal to the objection: The argument assumes that all classes of anaesthetics must work the same on the membrane. It is quite possible that one or two classes of molecules could work through a non-membrane mediated mechanism. For example, the alcohols were shown to incorporate into the lipid membrane via an enzymatic transphosphatidylation reaction. The ethanol metabolite bound to and inhibited an anesthetic channel. And while this mechanism may contradict a single unitary mechanism of anaesthesia, it does not preclude a membrane mediated one.
