= DESI1 =

Protein-coding gene in humans

Identifiers
- Aliases: DESI1, D15Wsu75e, DESI2, DJ347H13.4, DeSI-1, FAM152B, PPPDE2, desumoylating isopeptidase 1, POST
- External IDs: OMIM: 614637; MGI: 106313; GeneCards: DESI1
Available structures
PDB	Ortholog search: PDBe RCSB
PDB	List of PDB id codes 3EBQ
Enzyme activity
EC #	BRENDA	ExPASy	KEGG	MetaCyc
3.1.2.22	↗	↗	↗	↗

Gene location (Human)
Chr.	Chromosome 22 (human)
Band	22q13.2	Start	41,598,028 bp
Band	22q13.2	End	41,621,043 bp

Gene location (Mouse)
Chr.	Chromosome 15 (mouse)
Band	15 E1|15 38.34 cM	Start	81,876,724 bp
Band	15 E1|15 38.34 cM	End	81,918,063 bp
RNA expression pattern
Bgee	Human / Mouse (ortholog); Top expressed in: left testis; right testis; right lobe of liver; right auricle of heart; epithelium of colon; internal globus pallidus; prefrontal cortex; right frontal lobe; nucleus accumbens; external globus pallidus / Top expressed in: seminiferous tubule; thymus; deep cerebellar nuclei; globus pallidus; lateral geniculate nucleus; nucleus of stria terminalis; islet of Langerhans; central gray substance of midbrain; anterior horn of spinal cord; pontine nuclei; More reference expression data
BioGPS	n/a
Gene ontology
Molecular function	peptidase activity; hydrolase activity; identical protein binding
Cellular component	cytoplasm; nucleus
Biological process	proteolysis
Sources:Amigo / QuickGO
Orthologs
Databases	NCBI: entry; OMA: entry
Species	Human	Mouse
Entrez	27351	28075
Ensembl	ENSG00000100418	ENSMUSG00000022472
UniProt	Q6ICB0	Q9CQT7
RefSeq (mRNA)	NM_015704	NM_134095; NM_001356541
RefSeq (protein)	NP_056519	NP_598856; NP_001343470
Location (UCSC)	Chr 22: 41.6 – 41.62 Mb	Chr 15: 81.88 – 81.92 Mb
PubMed search
- Wikidata
View/Edit Human	View/Edit Mouse

Desumoylating isopeptidase 1 is a protein that in humans is encoded by the DESI1 gene. Desumoylating isopeptidase 1 is a dual-function hydrolase enzyme that removes two post-translational modifications from target proteins: SUMOylation and S-palmitoylation.
