= Correlation (disambiguation) =

Correlation is a measure of relationship between two mathematical variables or measured data values, which includes the Pearson correlation coefficient as a special case.

Correlation may also refer to:

- Electronic correlation, a description of the interaction between electrons in a quantum system
- Phase correlation, an analysis of translative movement between images
- Correlation (projective geometry), a type of duality amongst subspaces of a vector space
- Correlation (geology) is the scientific study of lithological or chronological equivalence between geological phenomena in different regions.
- Cross-correlation, a measure of similarity between two signals, used e.g. in seismology, to analyse seismic waves to determine the location of earthquakes
- Priesthood Correlation Program, a systematic approach for maintaining consistency in The Church of Jesus Christ of Latter-day Saints (LDS Church)
- Correlations (album), a 1979 album by Ashra

== See also ==
- Correlation function (disambiguation)
