= Palmitate mediated localization =

Biological process

Palmitate mediated localization is a biological process that traffics a palmitoylated protein to ordered lipid domains.

== Biological function ==
One function is thought to cluster proteins to increase the efficiency of protein-protein interactions and facilitate biological processes. In the opposite scenario palmitate mediated localization sequesters proteins away from a non-localized molecule. In theory, disruption of palmitate mediated localization then allows a transient interaction of two molecules through lipid mixing. In the case of an enzyme, palmitate can sequester an enzyme away from its substrate. Disruption of palmitate mediated localization then activates the enzyme by substrate presentation.

== Mechanism of sequestration ==
Palmitate mediated localization is integral to spatial biology; in particular, lipid partitioning and the formation of lipid rafts. Sequestration of palmitoylated proteins is regulated by cholesterol. Depletion of cholesterol with methyl-beta cyclodextrin disrupts palmitate mediated localization.
