= Acyl-protein thioesterase =

Enzymes that cleave off lipid modifications on proteins

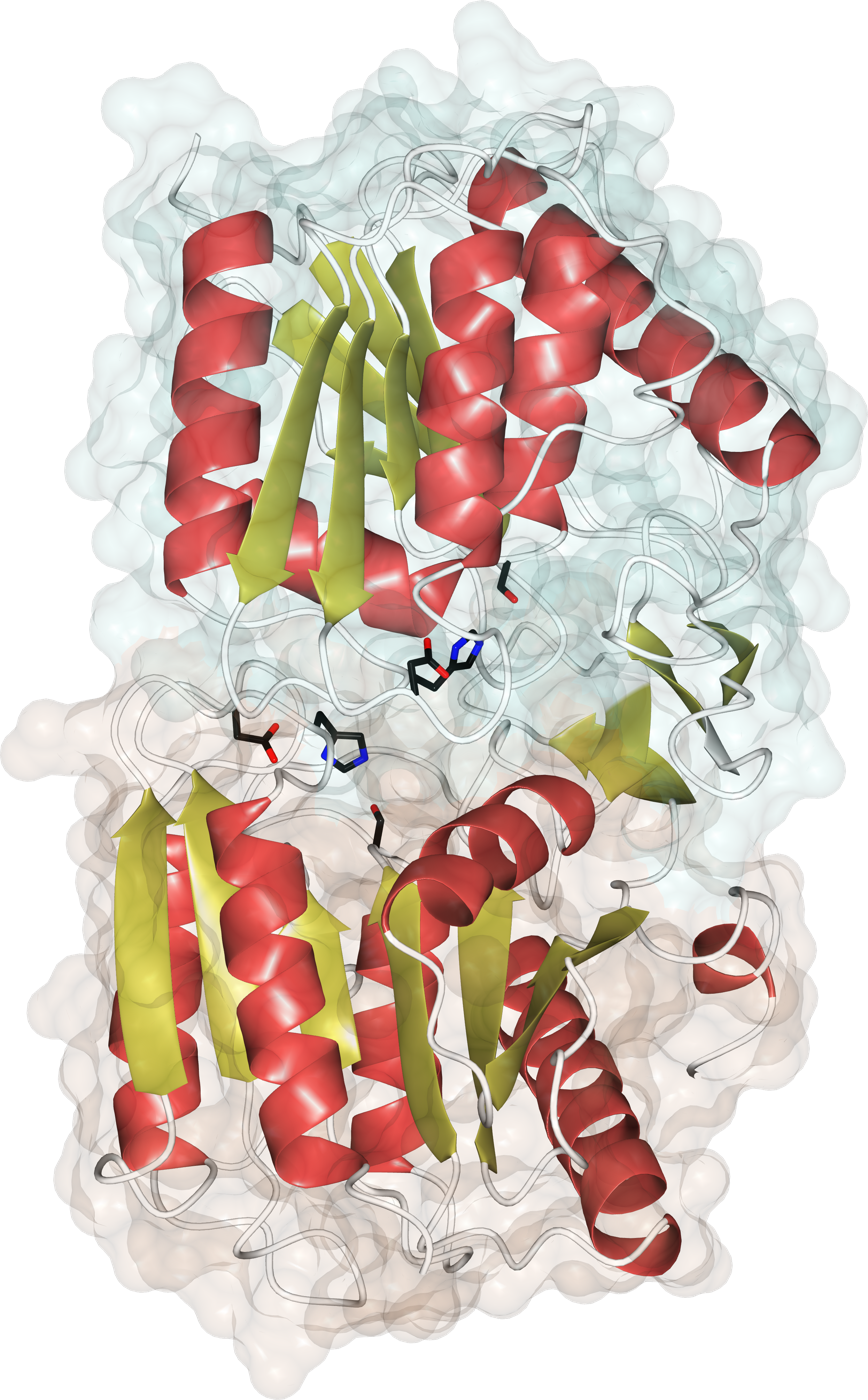
- Crystal structure of human APT1, PDB code 1fj2. Alpha helices are in red, beta strands in gold, catalytic site residues in black. The 2 different monomers of the dimer are shaded in green and brown.

Identifiers
- Symbol: Acyl-protein thioesterases (APTs)
- Pfam: PF02230
- InterPro: IPR029058
Available protein structures:
- PDB: IPR029058 PF02230 (ECOD; PDBsum)
- AlphaFold: IPR029058; PF02230

Acyl-protein thioesterases are enzymes that cleave off lipid modifications on proteins, located on the sulfur atom of cysteine residues linked via a thioester bond. Acyl-protein thioesterases are part of the α/β hydrolase superfamily of proteins and have a conserved catalytic triad. For that reason, acyl-protein thioesterases are also able to hydrolyze oxygen-linked ester bonds.

== Function ==
Acyl-protein thioesterases are involved in the depalmitoylation of proteins, meaning they cleave off palmitoyl modifications on proteins' cysteine residues. Cellular targets include trimeric G-alpha proteins, ion channels and GAP-43. Moreover, human acyl-protein thioesterases 1 and 2 have been identified as major components in controlling the palmitoylation cycle of the oncogene Ras. Depalmitoylation of Ras by acyl-protein thioesterases potentially reduces Ras' affinity to endomembranes, allowing it to be palmitoylated again at the Golgi apparatus and to be directed to the plasma membrane. Acyl-protein thioesterases, therefore, are thought to correct potential mislocalization of Ras.

== Known enzymes ==
Acyl-protein thioesterase 1

Identifiers
- Symbol: LYPA1
- Alt. symbols: APT1
- HGNC: 6737
- OMIM: 605599
- PDB: 5SYM
- RefSeq: NP_001266285.1
- UniProt: O75608

Other data
- EC number: 3.1.2.-
Search for
- Structures: Swiss-model
- Domains: InterPro

Acyl-protein thioesterase 2

Identifiers
- Symbol: LYPA2
- Alt. symbols: APT2
- HGNC: 6738
- OMIM: 616143
- PDB: 5SYN
- RefSeq: NC_000001.11
- UniProt: O95372

Other data
- EC number: 3.1.2.-
Search for
- Structures: Swiss-model
- Domains: InterPro

Currently fully validated human acyl-protein thioesterases are APT1 and APT2 which share 66% sequence homology. Additionally there are a handful of putative acyl-protein thioesterases reported, including the ABHD17 enzyme family. In the lysosome, PPT1 of the palmitoyl protein thioesterase family has similar enzymatic activity as acyl-protein thioesterases.

== Structure ==
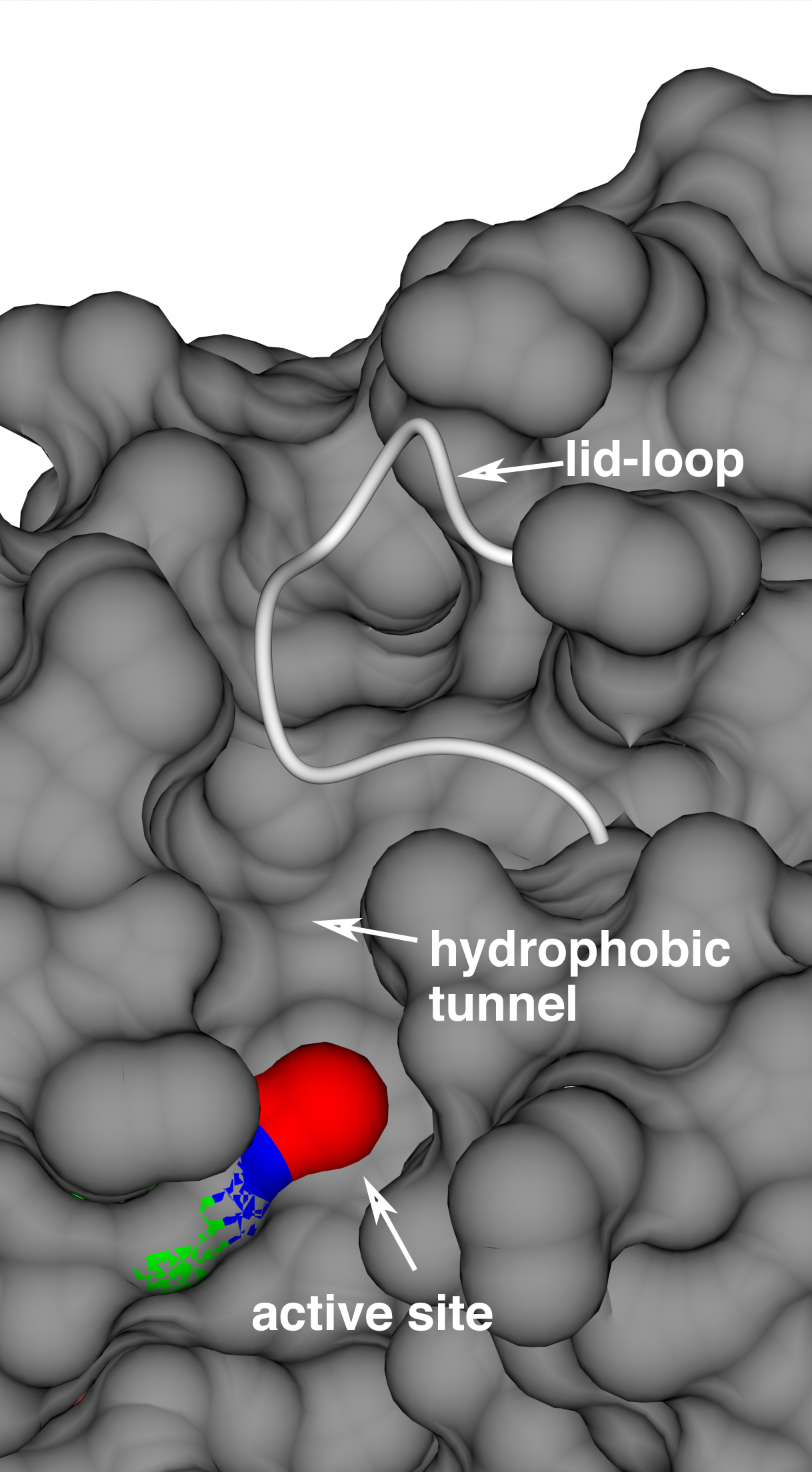
Active site, hydrophobic tunnel and lid-loop of acyl-protein thioesterases.

Acyl-protein thioesterases feature 3 major structural components that determine protein function and substrate processing: 1. A conserved, classical catalytic triad to break ester and thioester bonds; 2. A long hydrophobic substrate tunnel to accommodate the palmitoyl moiety, as identified in the crystal structures of human acyl-protein thioesterase 1, human acyl-protein thioesterase 2 and Zea mays acyl-protein thioesterase 2; 3. A lid-loop that covers the catalytic site, is highly flexible and is a main factor determining the enzyme's product release rate.

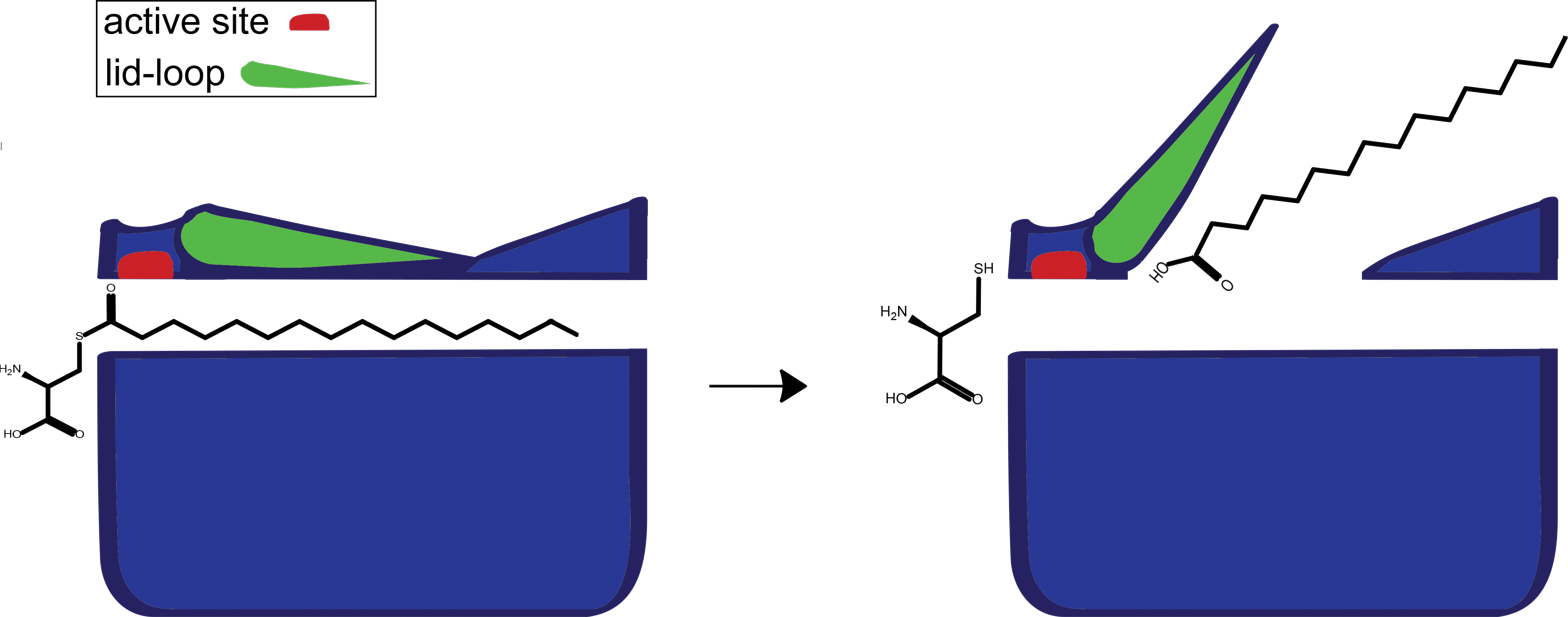
Mechanism of how acyl-protein thioesterases release their product by using a flexible lid-loop covering the substrate binding tunnel. Nature Communications 8(1):2201, Creative Commons Attribution 4.0 International License, https://creativecommons.org/licenses/by/4.0/

== Inhibition ==
The involvement in controlling the localization of the oncogene Ras has made acyl-protein thioesterases potential cancer drug targets. Inhibition of acyl-protein thioesterases is believed to increase mislocalization of Ras at the cell's membranes, eventually leading to a collapse of the Ras cycle. Inhibitors for acyl-protein thioesterases have been specifically targeting the hydrophobic substrate tunnel, the catalytic site serine or both.

== Research ==
Current approaches to study the biological activity of Acyl-protein Thioesterases include proteomics, monitoring the trafficking of microinjected fluorescent substrates, the use of cell-permeable substrate mimetics, and cell permeable small molecule fluorescent chemical tools.
