= Substrate presentation =

Activation of a protein by exposure to its substrate

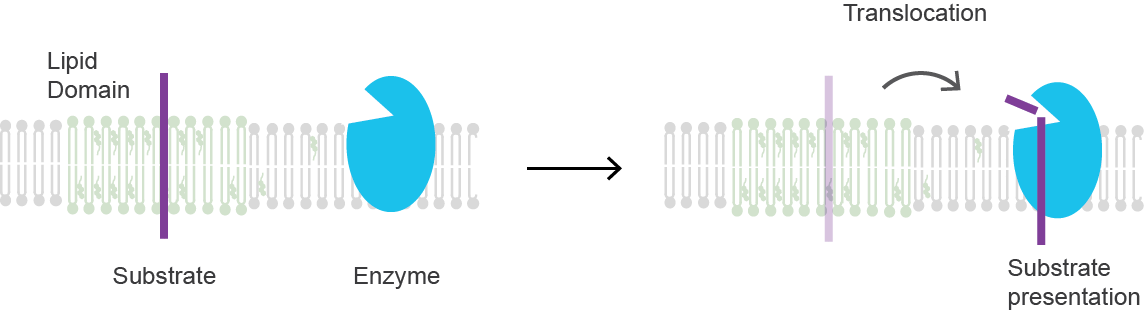
Substrate presentation; A substrate (purple rectangle) is shown sequestered into a lipid domain (green lipids). The substrate's translocation to the disordered region (grey lipids) presents it to its enzyme (blue oval) where it is hydrolyzed.

In molecular biology, substrate presentation is a biological process that activates a protein. The protein is sequestered away from its substrate and then activated by release and exposure to its substrate. A substrate is typically the substance on which an enzyme acts but can also be a protein surface to which a ligand binds. In the case of an interaction with an enzyme, the protein or organic substrate typically changes chemical form. Substrate presentation differs from allosteric regulation in that the enzyme need not change its conformation to begin catalysis. Substrate presentation is best described for domain partitioning at nanoscopic distances (<100 nm).

== Examples ==
=== Amyloid precursor protein ===
Amyloid precursor protein (APP) is cleaved by beta and gamma secretase to yield a 40-42 amino acid peptide responsible for amyloid plaques associated with Alzheimer's disease. The secretase enzymes are regulated by substrate presentation. The substrate APP is palmitoylated and moves in and out of GM1 lipid rafts in response to astrocyte cholesterol. Cholesterol delivered by apolipoprotein E (ApoE) drives APP to associate with GM1 lipid rafts. When cholesterol is low, the protein traffics to the disordered region and is cleaved by alpha secretase to produce a non-amylogenic product. The enzymes do not appear to respond to cholesterol, only the substrate moves.

Hydrophobicity drives the partitioning of molecules. In the cell, this gives rise to compartmentalization within the cell and within cell membranes. For lipid rafts, palmitoylation regulates raft affinity for the majority of integral raft proteins. Raft regulation is regulated by cholesterol signaling and spatial biology

=== Phospholipase D2 ===
(PLD2) is a well-defined example of an enzyme activated by substrate presentation. The enzyme is palmitoylated causing the enzyme to traffic to GM1 lipid domains or "lipid rafts". The substrate of phospholipase D is phosphatidylcholine (PC) which is unsaturated and is of low abundance in lipid rafts. PC localizes to the disordered region of the cell along with the polyunsaturated lipid phosphatidylinositol 4,5-bisphosphate (PIP2). PLD2 has a PIP2 binding domain. When PIP2 concentration in the membrane increases, PLD2 leaves the GM1 domains and associates with PIP2 domains where it then gains access to its substrate PC and commences catalysis based on substrate presentation. Presumably, the enzyme is capable of catalyzing a reaction in a lipid raft but lacks a substrate for activity.

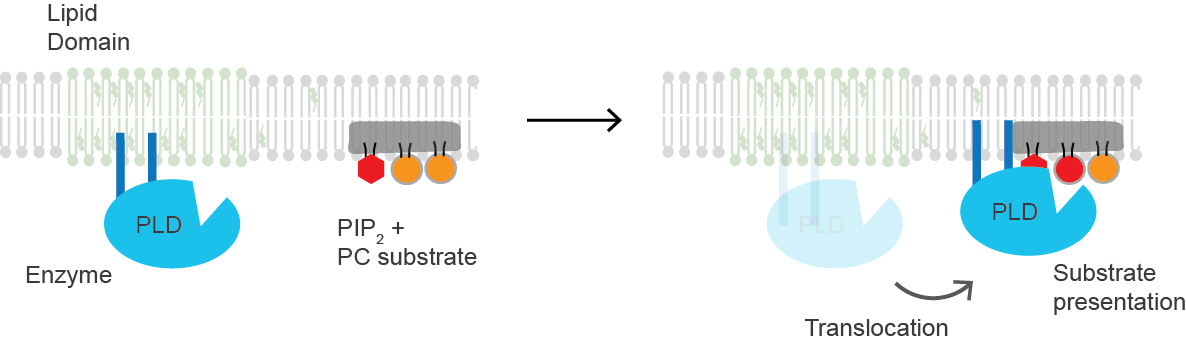
Enzyme translocation; PLD (blue oval) is sequestered into cholesterol-dependent lipid domains (green lipids) by palmitoylation. PLD also binds PIP2(red hexagon) domains (grey shading) located separate from GM1 clusters in the plasma membrane and near phosphatidylcholine (PC). When PIP2 increases in the cell PLD translocates to PIP2 where it is exposed to and hydrolyzes PC to phosphatidic acid (red spherical lipid).

=== Inflammation ===
(ADAM17), also called TACE, is sequestered into lipid rafts away from its substrate, membrane bound tumor necrosis factor (mTNF). Cholesterol causes mTNF to cluster with ADAM17 in lipid rafts and shed soluble TNF (sTNF) which is an inflammatory cytokine.

=== Kinase Signaling ===
Receptor Tyrosine Kinases are cell surface receptors that bind to various polypeptide growth factors, cytokines, and hormones. Activation of RTKs is driven by palmitoylation and dimerization, a process facilitated by cholesterol within lipid rafts. Once dimerized, the receptor undergoes autophosphorylation, which triggers a subsequent phosphorylation cascade. This is a specific case where the substrate and the enzyme are the same molecule.

Protein Kinase C (PKC) is a class of enzymes that phosphorylates proteins. Its substrates are typically on the membrane surface where the enzyme is recruited by the lipid diacylglycerol. Thus a portion of PKC activation is through substrate presentation, i.e., by localization with its substrate on the membrane.

=== SARS-CoV-2 ===
(Furin) (producing cell, replication). When cells are loaded with cholesterol furin traffics to GM1 lipid rafts where it is localized with the palmitoylated spike protein of SARS-CoV-2 and primes it for viral entry.

(ACE2) (target Cell, viral entry), the receptor for SARS-CoV-2 ACE2 traffics SARS-CoV-2 to GM1 lipid rafts where it is endocytosed and exposed to cathepsin for cleavage and optimal cells fusion. In low cholesterol ACE2 traffics the virus to TMPRSS2 which also cleaves and allows viral entry but through a putative surface mechanism that is much less efficient. The sensitivity of ACE2 to cholesterol is thought to contribute to less severe COVID19 symptoms in children.

== Mechanisms of activation ==
=== Sequestration ===
Sequestration is the process of moving a molecule to a lipid raft. Within the plasma membrane, sequestration is primarily driven by packing of saturated lipid with cholesterol or phase separation at very small distances (< 100 nm). At a macroscopic level, organelles and vesicle can limit access of an enzyme with to substrate.

Sequestration can both elevate and reduce the concentration of a protein in proximity to its substrate. When the substrate is present within a lipid raft, sequestration leads to an increased concentration of the protein near the substrate. Conversely, if the substrate is excluded from a lipid raft, sequestration results in decreased interaction between the protein and the substrate, as seen with PLD2.

Either the substrate of the enzyme can move. Movement is typically the disruption of palmitate mediated localization or organelle trafficking. For proteins that are both palmitoylated and bind PIP2, increasing the concentration of PIP2 favors trafficking of the enzyme out of lipid rafts to PIP2. PIP2 is primarily polyunsaturated which causes the lipid to localize away from lipid rafts and allows the PIP2 to oppose palmitate mediated localization.

== Regulation ==
=== Cholesterol ===
Cholesterol and polyunsaturated fatty acids (PUFAs) regulate lipid raft formation, hence the biological function of rafts. When saturated lipids and cholesterol increase in the membrane, lipid rafts increase their affinity for palmitoylated proteins. PUFAs have the opposite effect, they fluidize the membrane.

=== PUFAs ===
PUFAs may also increase the concentration of signaling lipids. The arachidonic acid, a very common PUFA in the brain, incorporates into PC and PIP2. Arachidonyl PC is a preferred substrate of PLD likely increasing the amount of PA in a cell. Regulation of raft function by cholesterol effectively regulates substrate presentation and the many palmitoylated proteins that utilize substrate presentation as a mechanism of activation. While speculative, the profound effect of cholesterol and PUFAs on human health is likely through physiological regulation of lipid raft function in cells.

== Role in biology ==
=== Mechanosensation ===
Mechanical force (shear or swell) can independently disrupt the packing and resultant affinity of palmitate to lipid rafts. This disruption also causes PLD2 to favor trafficking to PIP2 domains. The mechanosensitive ion channel TREK-1 is released from cholesterol dependent lipid rafts in response to mechanical force. This has the effect of dampening pain.

=== Anaesthesia ===
Membrane-mediated anesthesia employs substrate presentation. General anesthetics propofol and inhaled anesthetics xenon, chloroform, isoflurane, diethyl ether disrupt lipid raft function and palmitate mediated localization of PLD2 to lipid rafts. Activation of PLD then activates TREK-1 channels. The membrane mediated PLD2 activation could be transferred to an anesthetic insensitive homolog TRAAK, rending the channel anesthetic sensitive.
