= Palmitoleoylation =

Biochemical reaction

In palmitoleoylation, a palmitoleoyl group (derived from palmitoleic acid, pictured above) is added.

Palmitoleoylation is type of protein lipidation where the monounsaturated fatty acid palmitoleic acid is covalently attached to serine or threonine residues of proteins. Palmitoleoylation appears to play a significant role in trafficking and targeting and function of Wnt proteins.

O-Palmitoleoylation of Wnt proteins is catalysed by PORCN. The inverse reaction is done by NOTUM.
