= PORCN =

Protein-coding gene in the species Homo sapiens

Identifiers
- Aliases: PORCN, DHOF, FODH, MG61, PORC, PPN, porcupine homolog (Drosophila), porcupine O-acyltransferase
- External IDs: OMIM: 300651; MGI: 1890212; GeneCards: PORCN
Enzyme activity
| EC # | BRENDA | ExPASy | KEGG | MetaCyc |
|---|---|---|---|---|
| 2.3.1.250 | ↗ | ↗ | ↗ | ↗ |

Gene location (Human)
| Chr. | X chromosome (human) |
| Band | Xp11.23 | Start | 48,508,959 bp |
| Band | Xp11.23 | End | 48,520,814 bp |

Gene location (Mouse)
| Chr. | X chromosome (mouse) |
| Band | X A1.1|X 3.7 cM | Start | 8,060,087 bp |
| Band | X A1.1|X 3.7 cM | End | 8,072,764 bp |
RNA expression pattern
| Bgee | Human / Mouse (ortholog); Top expressed in: right adrenal cortex; left adrenal cortex; right hemisphere of cerebellum; right frontal lobe; stromal cell of endometrium; anterior cingulate cortex; right auricle of heart; prefrontal cortex; granulocyte; apex of heart / Top expressed in: primary visual cortex; dentate gyrus of hippocampal formation granule cell; esophagus; superior frontal gyrus; cerebellar cortex; neural layer of retina; morula; lip; urethra; muscle of thigh; More reference expression data |
| BioGPS | n/a |
Gene ontology
| Molecular function | transferase activity; Wnt-protein binding; acyltransferase activity; palmitoleoyltransferase activity |
| Cellular component | integral component of membrane; integral component of endoplasmic reticulum membrane; AMPA glutamate receptor complex; endoplasmic reticulum membrane; endoplasmic reticulum; membrane; glutamatergic synapse |
| Biological process | canonical Wnt signaling pathway; protein lipidation; glycoprotein metabolic process; Wnt signaling pathway; protein palmitoleylation; regulation of postsynaptic membrane neurotransmitter receptor levels |
Sources:Amigo / QuickGO
Orthologs
| Databases | NCBI: entry; OMA: entry |
| Species | Human | Mouse |
| Entrez | 64840 | 53627 |
| Ensembl | ENSG00000102312 | ENSMUSG00000031169 |
| UniProt | Q9H237 | Q9JJJ7 |
| RefSeq (mRNA) | NM_001282167; NM_022825; NM_203473; NM_203474; NM_203475 NM_203476 | NM_016913; NM_023638; NM_145907; NM_145908; NM_001308474 |
| RefSeq (protein) | NP_001269096; NP_073736; NP_982299; NP_982300; NP_982301 | NP_001295403; NP_058609; NP_076127; NP_665914; NP_665915 |
| Location (UCSC) | Chr X: 48.51 – 48.52 Mb | Chr X: 8.06 – 8.07 Mb |
| PubMed search |
- Wikidata
| View/Edit Human | View/Edit Mouse |

PORCN (porcupine homolog – Drosophila) is a human gene. The protein is homologous to other membrane-bound O-acyltransferases.

== Function ==
The protein encoded by this gene is an endoplasmic reticulum transmembrane protein involved in processing of wingless proteins such as WNT7A. It performs O-Palmitoleoylation of these proteins.

== Clinical significance ==
Mutations in this gene are associated with focal dermal hypoplasia.

Mutations in PORCN are associated to Goltz-Gorlin syndrome.

== Ligands ==
=== Inhibitors ===
- WNT974 (LGK-974) - 1243244-14-5, researched for anti-cancer effects in Wnt-pathway sensitive tumours. Also investigated for influencing cardiac tissue remodelling following infarction.

IWP (1-4)

RXC004
