= Palmitoylation =

Post-translational modification

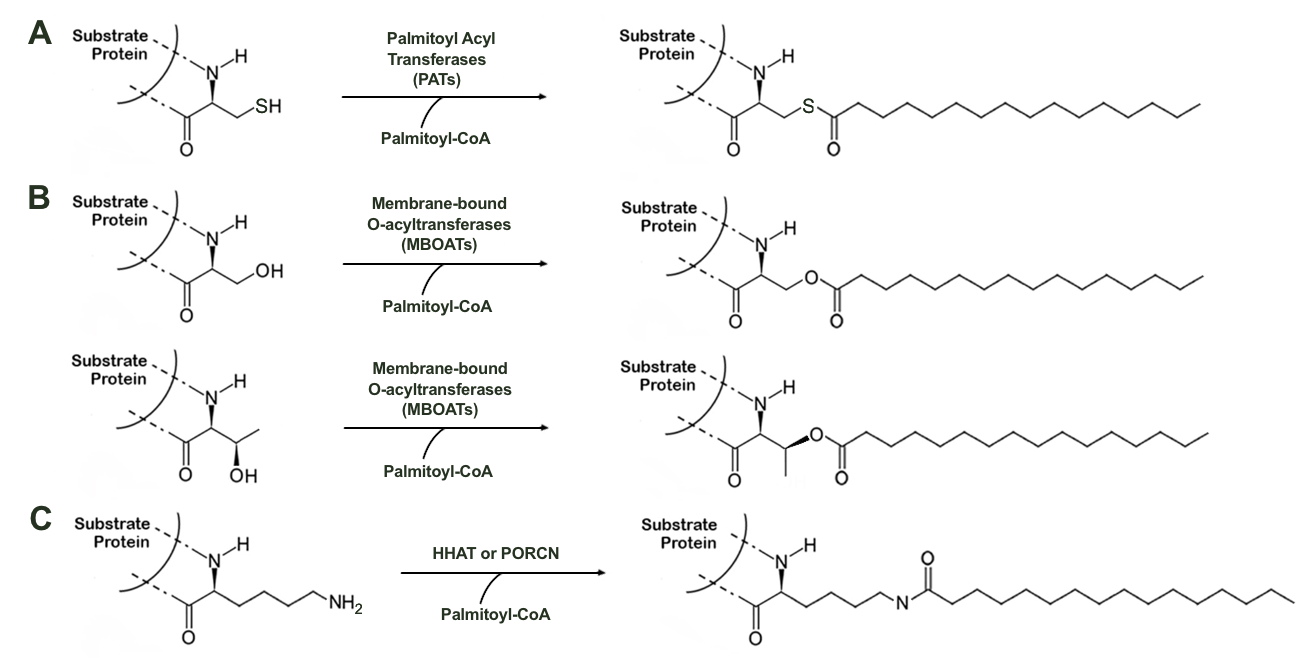
- Post-translational modification in which palmitate is covalently attached to a target protein via acyltransferases.

Biochemical Reaction
- Part of: Cell
- Located: Nucleus, Cytoplasm
- Category: Post-translational Modification
- Type: Acylation, Lipidation

Central Functions
- Promotion of Membrane Association Regulation of Membrane Protein Stability Modulation of Protein Trafficking

Donor Molecule
- Palmitoyl-CoA

Key Enzymes
- MBOATs, HHAT, PORCN Palmitoyl acyltransferases (PATs) Acyl-protein thioesterases

Discovered
1979	Schmidt & Schlesinger; Discover palmitoylation as a novel post-translational modification
- Category

Protein palmitoylation refers to the post-translational modification in which palmitate is covalently attached to an amino acid residue on a target protein via palmitoyl acyltransferases. Palmitoylation itself refers to the overall class of post-translational modifications involving palmitate; however, these reactions are further classified by the individual amino acid residue for which they occur (ie., S-palmitoylation, N-palmitoylation, O-palmitoylation).

Protein palmitoylation relies upon the intracellular availability of the donor molecule palmitoyl-CoA, which is synthesized in the cytosol of the cell. As a fatty acylation reaction, protein palmitoylation is classified as both an acylation and a lipidation post-translational modification.

Notably, the reversibility of protein palmitoylation is determined by the amino acid residue on which the modification occurs. O- and N-palmitoylation are stable, irreversible modifications comparable to that of N-myristoylation. However, S-palmitoylation is a highly dynamic reversible modification, in which the reverse reaction is catalyzed by palmitoyl-protein thioesterases (PPTs).

Palmitoylation is known to enhance the hydrophobicity of substrate proteins and thereby allows soluble proteins to associate with cellular membranes. Palmitoylation also plays a significant role in regulating the stability and subcellular trafficking of proteins between membrane compartments, and is known to modulate protein–protein interactions.

Palmitoylation has been reported for both histone and non-histone protein substrates, and thus represents a distinct epigenetic regulatory mechanism with various implications in health and disease. Recent studies have unveiled the critical role of palmitoylation in mediating a wide range of physiological processes, including neurotransmission and immune responses.

Palmitoylation is known to contribute to several significant diseases, including Huntington's disease and various cancers. To date, palmitoylation is known to modify as many as 6,000 protein substrates, including a large body of immunity-associated proteins, metabolic transporters, and synaptic proteins.

== Mechanism ==
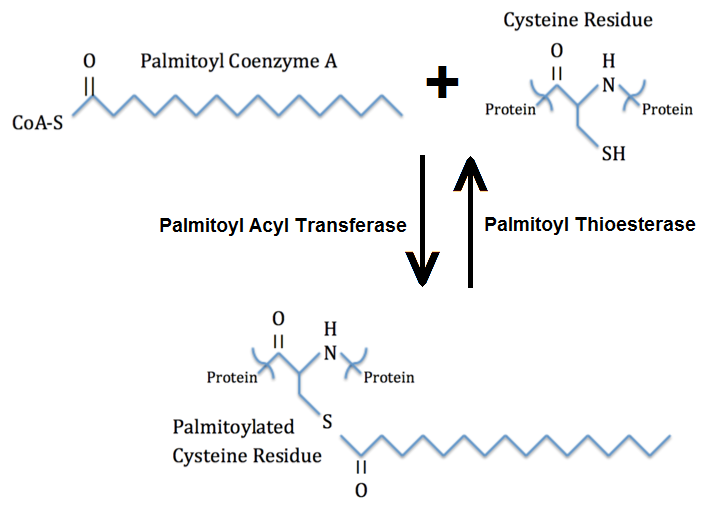
Palmitoylation of a cysteine residue

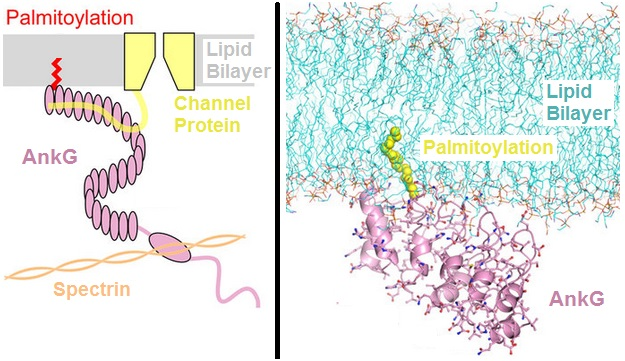
Left Palmitoylation (red) anchors Ankyrin G to the plasma membrane. Right Close up. Palmityl residue in yellow.

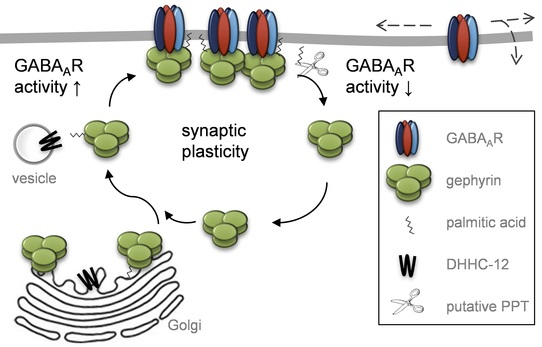
Palmitoylation of Gephyrin Controls Receptor Clustering and Plasticity of GABAergic Synapses

S-palmitoylation is generally done by proteins with the DHHC domain. Exceptions exist in non-enzymatic reactions. Acyl-protein thioesterase (APT) catalyses the reverse reaction. Other acyl groups such as stearate (C18:0) or oleate (C18:1) are also frequently accepted, more so in plant and viral proteins, making S-acylation a more useful name.

Several structures of the DHHC domain have been determined using X-ray crystallography. It contains a linearly-arranged catalytic triad of Asp153, His154, and Cys156. It runs on a ping-pong mechanism, where the cysteine attacks the acyl-CoA to form an S-acylated DHHC, and then the acyl group is transferred to the substrate. DHHR enzymes exist, and it (as well as some DHHC enzymes) may use a ternary complex mechanism instead.

An inhibitor of S-palmitoylation by DHHC is 2-Bromopalmitate (2-BP). 2-BP is a nonspecific inhibitor that also halts many other lipid-processing enzymes.

== The palmitoylome ==
A meta-analysis of 15 studies produced a compendium of approximately 2,000 mammalian proteins that are palmitoylated. The highest associations of the palmitoylome are with cancers and disorders of the nervous system. Approximately 40% of synaptic proteins were found in the palmitoylome.

== Biological function ==
=== Substrate presentation ===
Palmitoylation mediates the affinity of a protein for lipid rafts and facilitates the clustering of proteins. The clustering can increase the proximity of two molecules. Alternatively, clustering can sequester a protein away from a substrate. For example, palmitoylation of phospholipase D sequesters the enzyme away from its substrate phosphatidylcholine. When cholesterol levels decrease or PIP_{2} levels increase the palmitate mediated localization is disrupted, the enzyme trafficks to PIP_{2} where it encounters its substrate and is active by substrate presentation.

=== General Anesthesia ===
Palmitoylation is necessary for the inactivation of anesthesia, inducing potassium channels and the localization of GABA_{A} receptors in synapses. Anesthetics compete with palmitate in ordered lipids and this release gives rise to a component of membrane-mediated anesthesia. For example, channel TREK-1 is activated by anesthetic displacement from GM1 lipids. The palmitoylation site is specific for palmitate over prenylation. However, the anesthetics appear to compete non-specifically. This non-selective competition of anesthetic with palmitate likely gives rise to the Myer-Overton correlation.

=== Synapse formation ===
Scientists have appreciated the significance of attaching long hydrophobic chains to specific proteins in cell signaling pathways. A good example of its significance is in the clustering of proteins in the synapse. A major mediator of protein clustering in the synapse is the postsynaptic density (95kD) protein PSD-95. When this protein is palmitoylated it is restricted to the membrane. This restriction to the membrane allows it to bind to and cluster ion channels in the postsynaptic membrane. Also, in the presynaptic neuron, palmitoylation of SNAP-25 directs it to partition in the cell membrane and allows the SNARE complex to dissociate during vesicle fusion. This provides a role for palmitoylation in regulating neurotransmitter release.

Palmitoylation of delta catenin seems to coordinate activity-dependent changes in synaptic adhesion molecules, synapse structure, and receptor localizations that are involved in memory formation.

Palmitoylation of gephyrin has been reported to influence GABAergic synapses.

== See also ==
- DHHC domain
- Myristoylation
- Myelin proteolipid protein
- Palmitoleoylation
- Prenylation
- Membrane-mediated anesthesia
