= LGK974 =

Identifiers
- IUPAC name: 2-[5-methyl-6-(2-methylpyridin-4-yl)pyridin-3-yl]-N-(5-pyrazin-2-ylpyridin-2-yl)acetamide
- CAS Number: 210826-47-4
- PubChem CID: 46926973
- IUPHAR/BPS: 11167
- DrugBank: DB12561
- ChemSpider: 30507712
- UNII: U27F40013Q
- ChEBI: CHEBI:78030
- ChEMBL: ChEMBL3188386
- PDB ligand: O50 (PDBe, RCSB PDB)

Chemical and physical data
- Formula: C_{23}H_{20}N_{6}O
- Molar mass: 396.454 g·mol^{−1}
- 3D model (JSmol): Interactive image
- SMILES: CC1=CC(=CN=C1C2=CC(=NC=C2)C)CC(=O)NC3=NC=C(C=C3)C4=NC=CN=C4
- InChI: InChI=1S/C23H20N6O/c1-15-9-17(12-28-23(15)18-5-6-25-16(2)10-18)11-22(30)29-21-4-3-19(13-27-21)20-14-24-7-8-26-20/h3-10,12-14H,11H2,1-2H3,(H,27,29,30); Key:XXYGTCZJJLTAGH-UHFFFAOYSA-N

LGK974 (WNT974) is an experimental drug which acts as an inhibitor of the porcupine O-acyltransferase enzyme, which plays an important part in the growth of certain types of cancer, especially colorectal cancer, pancreatic cancer, hepatocellular carcinoma and head and neck cancers. It is in early stage clinical trials for a number of cancer types.

LGK974 has recently shown promise in preclinical models of the ultra-rare disease sclerosteosis, providing an alternative to invasive surgeries commonly required to the management of pathologies.
