= Palmitoyl acyltransferase =

Protein family

Palmitoyl acyltransferases are a group of enzymes that transfer palmityl group to -SH group on cysteine on a protein. This modification increases the hydrophobicity of the protein, thereby increasing the association to plasma membrane or other intramembraneous compartments.

== Domain structure ==
The palmitoyl acyltransferase was isolated and identified in 1999. The catalytic domain of the protein has aspartate-histidine-histidine-cysteine (DHHC) in the core and therefore is called DHHC domain.

== Substrate proteins ==
The example of substrate includes H-Ras, N-ras, R-Ras, RhoB, Cdc42 inform 2, Rab10, Galpha subunit of trimeric GTP binding proteins, Src family tyrosine kinases, GAP53, eNOS, AMPA receptor subunit GluR1 and GluR2, GABA_{A} receptor gamma2 subunit, aquaporin, KV1.1, rhodopsin, beta2-adrenergic receptor, and PSD-95. https://swisspalm.org/enzymes

== Physiological Functions ==
The protein palmitoylation is a reversible process. The addition of palmitoyl group increase the membrane association of the substrate protein while the removal by palmitoyl thioesterase decreases the membrane association.
