= Spatial DNA methylation profiling =

Technology for examining cells

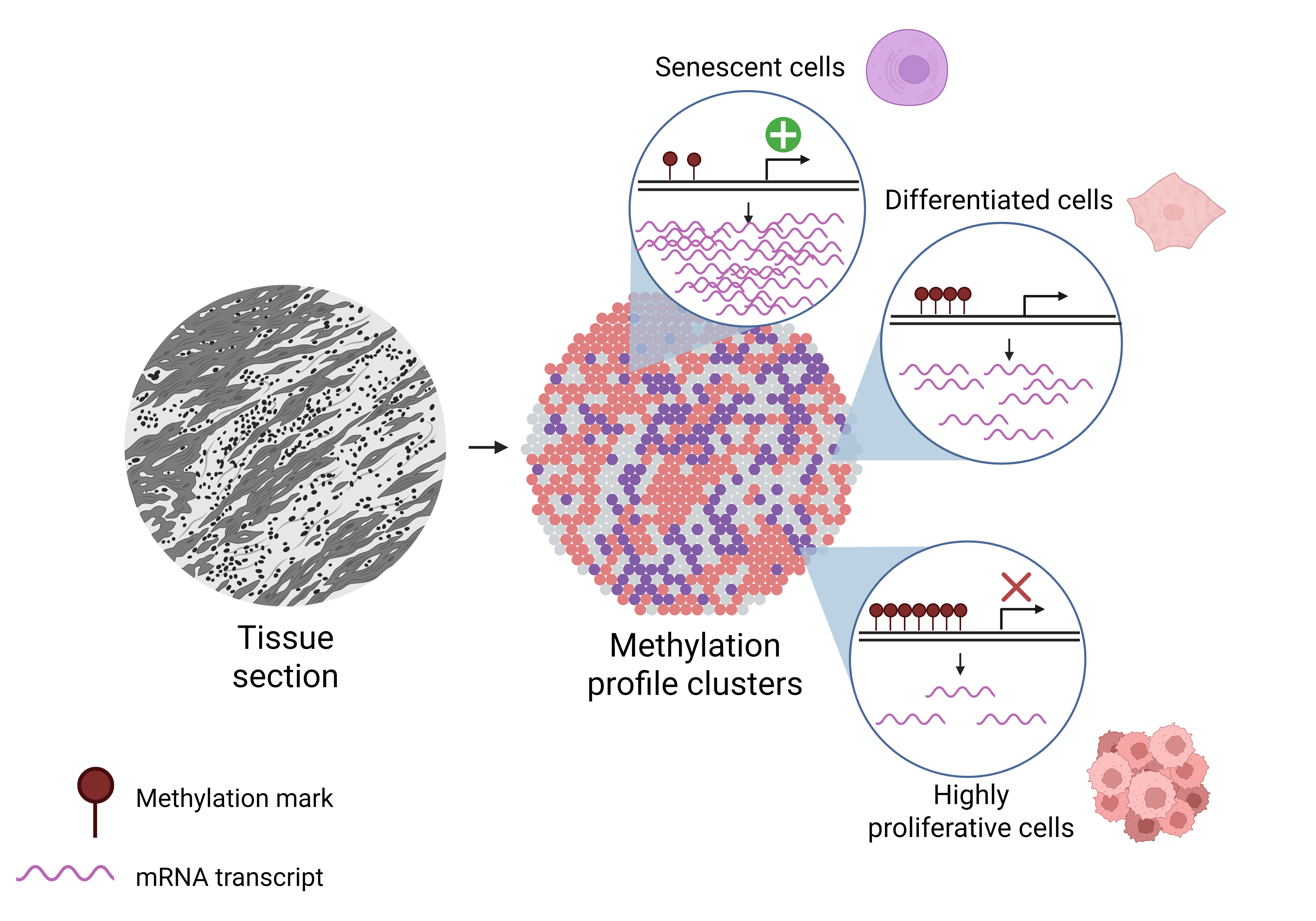
Illustration demonstrating cellular heterogeneity in tissues due to differences in DNA methylation that impacts gene expression, cellular state, and phenotype to demonstrate the importance of capturing the spatial context of DNA methylation. The tissue section on the left is represented as methylation profile clusters on the right, which capture the spatial context of DNA methylation differences for selected genes. Each methylation profile corresponds to a particular cellular phenotype, where the pink clusters exhibit hypomethylation, leading to highly active transcription of specific genes to promote proliferation, the beige clusters represent moderate levels of methylation, leading to cell differentiation, and the purple clusters represent a senescent cell state caused by hypermethylation of specific regions that leads to transcriptional repression. The impact methylation has on cellular phenotype is context-specific across the genome, leading to unique patterns in overall gene expression that influence cell function. Created in https://BioRender.com

Spatial DNA methylation profiling refers to technologies that combine the measurements of DNA methylation and the spatial information of cells. These experimental technologies are used to gather insight into these distinct patterns and how they can impact gene regulation in individual cells, from visualizing the overall pattern of specific methylation marks within tissues, to identifying the location of these methylation marks both in the genome and within a tissue. DNA methylation is one of multiple major epigenetic factors that influence genetic expression. Traditional bulk and newer single-cell methylation assays measure methylation levels but lose important information about where cells reside, thus losing a level of analysis on outside influences on cells.

By incorporating spatial information, researchers can use spatial DNA methylation profiling to investigate the influence of epigenetic regulation across various tissue environments and how it varies between them. Key methods include imaging-based approaches like antibody staining of methylation marks followed by visualization using microscopy, and sequencing-based methods like assigning unique barcodes to DNA or tissue dissection followed by traditional methylation sequencing approaches.

The technologies are still being developed and tested, and although these methods vary in resolution, interpretation, and throughput, they promise to enable a more comprehensive understanding of tissue biology and its influences on development and disease.

== Background ==
=== DNA methylation ===
DNA methylation is a direct chemical modification to the DNA molecule that influences mechanisms such as cell differentiation as well as gene regulation. The amount of DNA methylation within the genome varies to mediate cell-specific processes, meaning that gene expression differs within and across tissues, despite having the same DNA sequence. DNA methylation is catalysed by a family of proteins called DNA methyltransferases, which work by transferring a methyl group from an S-adenyl methionine to the fifth carbon of a cytosine to form a 5-methylcytosine (5mC). DNA methylation accounts for only ~1% of nucleic acids in the human genome, with the majority occurring on cytosines preceding a guanine, creating a CpG site. Methylation is found more in intergenic regions to silence transposable and viral elements that have inserted themselves into the human genome over time. CpG islands are associated with promoters and transcription factors, where methylation can cause stable silencing of gene expression. DNA methylation of the gene body acts differently, being associated with active transcription, not silencing. Functionally, DNA methylation plays a role in:

- Silencing transposable and viral elements
- Tissue-specific gene regulation
- Genomic imprinting
- X-chromosome inactivation

=== Early DNA methylation assays ===
DNA methylation was discovered in mammals almost as early as DNA was identified, with Rolin Hotchkiss discovering modified cytosine or 5-methylcytosine (5mC). But, 5mC was reported in bacteria in 1925 by Johnson and Coghill. 5mC was shown to be found across a variety of species and cell types in the 1970s, and further studies showed it lagged behind DNA replication in 1971. Initial assays used restriction enzymes to see where DNA methylation occurred and if any changes occurred. Early DNA methylation assays did not show what methylation was associated with, but they understood it was associated with a change in cell identity. Once it was understood to have a function in bacteria, other types of assays were used to explore the methylation content using mass spectrometry. A culmination of these assays and studies into DNA methylation concluded that 5mC plays a role in gene expression. In the 1990s, bisulfite sequencing was invented, allowing for bases in nucleic acids to be detected, which led to microarrays being created in the 2000s to have large-scale, high-throughput studies of specific CpG sites.

=== Bulk DNA Methylation sequencing ===
Bulk DNA methylation sequencing is similar to bulk single-cell sequencing, taking an average of measurements. In this, measurements are of the level of 5mC across a population of cells, showing averages of methylation, to understand the current epigenetic regulation and gene expression in a specific tissue. Typically, bulk DNA methylation analysis uses bisulfite conversion or nanopore sequencing technologies to measure methylation. Some of these analyses have been used to identify abnormal methylation patterns associated with cancer.

=== Single-Cell Methylation sequencing ===
In recent years, many fields have begun utilizing single-cell technologies, ranging from single-cell sequencing to single-cell ATAC-seq. Following this technology boom, single-cell methylation studies have been produced; some of these are Q-RRBS, snmC-seq, and scMspJI. These kits and assays are not as powerful - meaning rapid, cost-effective, and simultaneous - as Bulk DNA methylation or other standard methylation analyses; however, they have started to be used to analyse and profile rare cells and disease states, to capture the underlying differences in rarer cell types that are missed in bulk analyses that average methylation across a population of cells.

== Scientific principles ==
=== Preservation of spatial information in analyses ===
Tissues are organised into structured microenvironments within the body. They are composed of diverse cell types, extracellular components, and signalling gradients. Certain elements of spatial information influence DNA methylation, like cell lineage, environmental exposures, cell-cell interactions, and disease microenvironments. Conventional assays cannot determine the ways epigenetic differences are influenced by physical location, which has been linked to differences in disease severity. Preserving spatial information allows for better analysis of methylation states and allows linkage between physical states and methylation states.

=== Relevance of Spatial DNA methylation ===
Identifying spatial differences in DNA methylation captures the underlying biology and diversity of methylation patterns observed in the genome. For example, tumours exhibit different patterns compared to healthy cells, such as CpG islands exhibiting hypermethylation, with differences between tumours also identified at the genome level and within the same origin. Furthermore, senescent cells have disorganized methylation compared to normal cells, environmental factors cause DNA methylation changes, and different cell types themselves exhibit complex methylation patterns. Cellular DNA methylation heterogeneity occurs to regulate gene expression for the conservation of cell-specific phenotypes and morphology. Hypermethylation and hypomethylation cause gene suppression and activation, respectively. This can uncover unique cellular patterns that genetic data alone cannot provide, such as in Ewing sarcoma, where patients exhibit similar mutations in their genome, but methylation differences influenced gene expression in specific cells and influenced disease severity.

=== Technological advances to preserve spatial information ===
Sequencing technologies have emerged that aim to capture the underlying biology of the cell and its interaction with its surroundings. For example, bulk sequencing captures tissue-level properties and single-cell sequencing technologies improves resolution, addressing the major limitation of bulk sequencing, which averages data to its tissue of origin. Although single-cell technologies can improve the scientific understanding of cell types and tissues, the spatial context with which these cells reside cannot be inferred, which led to the development of spatial technologies which incorporate tissue imaging, barcoding of DNA, and sequencing together.

Spatial transcriptomics, spatial epigenomics, and spatial proteomics are prominent examples of spatial technologies that have provided novel insight into expression, epigenetic, and protein differences within tissues, respectively. These work by either barcoding the molecule of interest to be sequenced so that the original location in the tissue can be identified, or through imaging of tissues with probes bound to targeted molecules.

== Methods ==
=== Sequencing-based methods ===
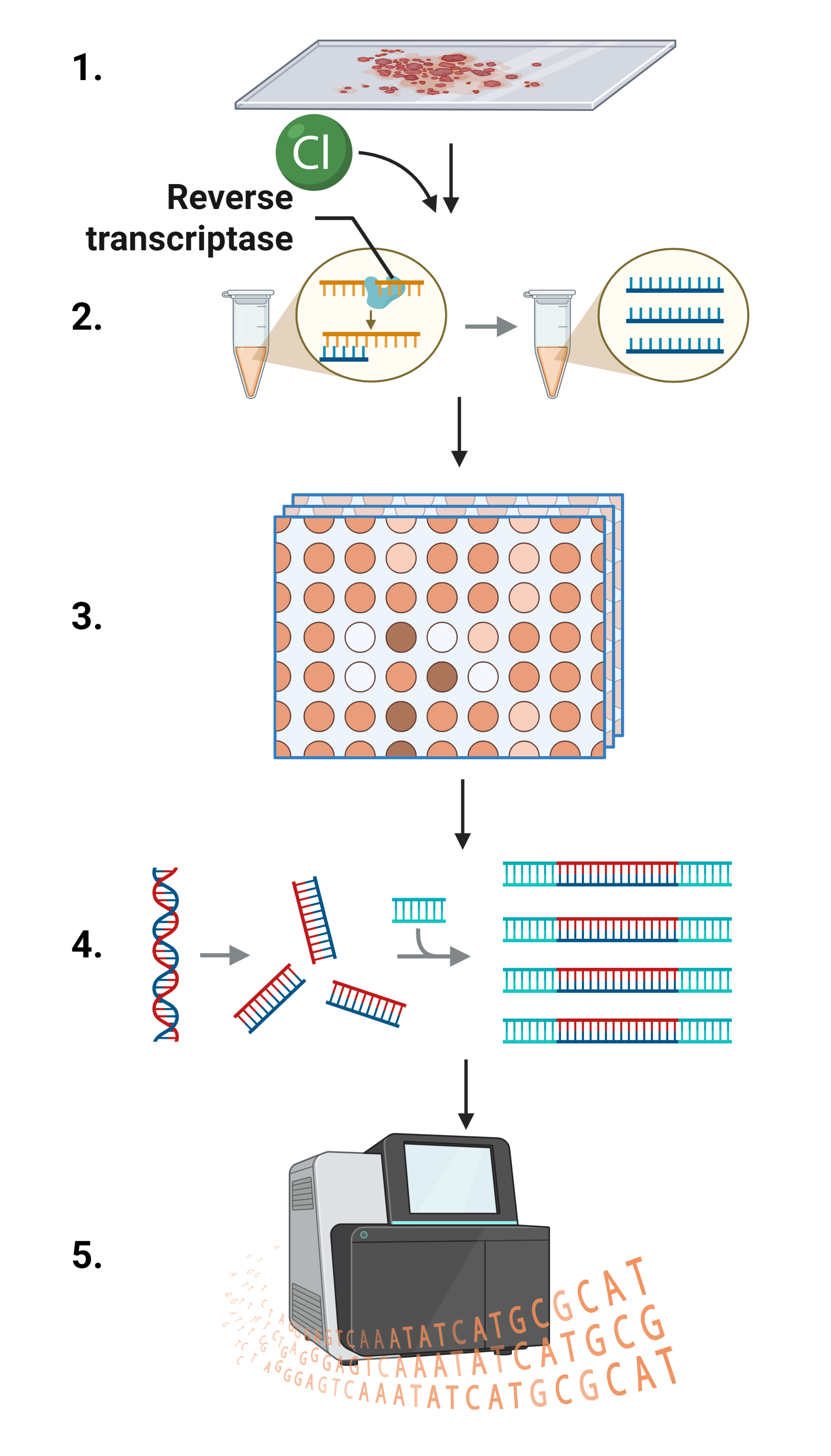
Spatial DMT Chemistry Workflow: Created in https://www.biorender.com/. Spatial DMT is a technique for mapping DNA methylation marks to spatial sections. Here, we diagram the chemistry workflow of the technique as described in Lee et al. 2025. (1) Tissue samples are fixed and permeabilized for better access to DNA and for spatial mapping. Tissue samples are treated with HCl to remove histones for better accessibility of chromatin by Tn5. (2) Tn5, a transposase, will integrate sequencing adaptors into genomic DNA or into cDNA that has been reverse transcribed by In Situ Reverse Transcription. (3) gDNA or cDNA samples are ligated along the sequence to encode their spatial coordinates into a microfluidic system. (4) cDNA and gDNA samples are then separated using streptavidin beads and processed either via template switching (cDNA) or NEBNext EM-seq conversion (gDNA) to prepare for library construction and detecting 5mC. (5) Libraries are then sent off for sequencing, and the data is analyzed.

==== Spatial Joint Profiling of the DNA methylome and transcriptome ====
Spatial joint profiling of the DNA methylome and transcriptome, or spatial-DMT, is a recently developed protocol for sequencing both DNA methylation and expression simultaneously in tissues by the Deng laboratory at the University of Pennsylvania. This is the first to capture spatial DNA methylation at high resolution, similar to other spatial sequencing technologies. Motivation for this protocol arose from the lack of sequencing technologies that specifically measure spatial DNA methylation patterns. Furthermore, it is used to investigate transcription and methylation together to understand the relationship between them that cannot be accurately captured with other technologies.

In summary, the protocol begins with fixing the tissue and adaptor ligation to genomic DNA (gDNA) using the Tn5 transposome, as well as the simultaneous generation of a cDNA library from mRNAs. Next, spatial barcodes are added to the cDNA and gDNA to capture the location of these molecules using microfluidic in situ barcoding, then the two DNA types are separated to individually sequence the methylome and transcriptome.

For methylome profiling, they chose enzymatic methyl-seq, which involves a preparation step that uses the enzyme ten-eleven translocation methylcytosine dioxygenase 2 (TET2) to preserve methylated cytosines. Afterwards, they add a PCR adaptor to these gDNA fragments to create the finalised product for sequencing. This fragment has the information that can be sequenced and analysed to uncover tissue-specific methylation differences in conjunction with expression levels of RNA at the same coordinates.

This protocol has been used for the investigation of whole-genome spatial DNA methylation patterns in conjunction with the transcriptome with success at high resolution. However, it cannot be used to identify different types of methylation marks, highlighting a need to advance this technology for improved specificity.

==== Laser capture microdissection & DNA methylation profiling ====
Laser capture microdissection (LCM) followed by DNA methylation profiling has been used in various contexts. This involves the selection of a region of interest within tissue, DNA extraction, conversion of unmethylated cytosines to uracil through bisulfite conversion, and either investigation of a specific region through PCR amplification or next-generation sequencing.

Laser capture microdissection-reduced representation bisulfite sequencing (LCM-RRBS) is one example of an approach to capture spatial DNA methylation patterns, developed by the Mitra lab at the Washington University School of Medicine. This technique involves the extraction of tissue from specific regions within a fixed tissue sample using LCM. Next, adaptors are added to the DNA following extraction and preparation, and the DNA fragments undergo bisulfite conversion to capture the methylation patterns. Last, sample barcodes are added to track the region from which the sample was obtained. Although this method does provide some spatial context in order to resolve differences across tissues, resolution is low as the patterns acquired are limited to the size of the sample obtained using LCM.

=== Imaging-Based methods ===
==== Methylation Mark immunostaining ====
Antibody binding to 5mC was one of the first DNA methylation marker assays that could be used to detect DNA methylation differences between cells and tissues. This method involves immunostaining using the antibody to target the 5mC marks in a tissue section, fluorescence imaging, and measuring signal intensity to determine 5mC localization. Other work has also utilised antibodies targeting other DNA methylation marks such as 5-formylcytosine and 5-carboxylcytosine, to identify methylation differences at the tissue and cell levels. This approach provides a visual representation of DNA methylation abundance for the markers of interest; however, it is not fully quantitative and it cannot be used to identify the DNA sequence the methylation marks come from.

==== Methylation-Specific Fluorescence in situ Hybridization ====
Methylation-specific fluorescence in situ hybridization (MeFISH) is a technique that also targets methylation marks such as 5mC and 5-Hydroxymethylcytosine (5hmC), but instead is used to target methylation in satellite DNA repeats. Fluorescent labels are attached to Interstrand Complexes formed by Osmium and Nucleic Acids ("ICON") probes that bind to the 5mC or 5hmC methylation marks using in situ hybridization, and are visualized using microscopy to identify these sites within tissues. This is similar to methylation mark immunostaining in that it uses fluorescence to detect methylation marks; however, it can also provide insight into the sequence itself, as it specifically targets satellite DNA repeats. MeFISH cannot be used to detect other sites, relies solely on fluorescence, and accessibility can be limited.

=== Related technologies ===
==== Spatial Epigenomic profiling ====
Spatial DNA methylation profiling is still in its infancy, with the techniques described above providing a glimpse into the beginning of a new field to understand gene regulation. However, other technologies exist to address numerous other epigenetic marks that are of interest. For example, spatial-CUT&Tag and Epigenomic MERFISH are techniques used to profile histone modifications while capturing the spatial and cell context the modifications are in. Spatial ATAC-seq is used for determining chromatin accessibility in the genome while preserving spatial context.

== Characteristics & Properties ==
=== Resolution ===
Resolution in this context refers to the ability to distinguish DNA methylation patterns and its spatial context. Imaging-based approaches are low-resolution methods, as fluorescently labelling methylation marks can help identify overall methylation patterns but cannot provide base-pair resolution. Sequencing-based methods approach this level of resolution, providing insight into the distribution of these methylation marks at the single-base and can also approach single-cell level.

=== Spatial context ===
Spatial DNA methylation profiling techniques provide the preservation of spatial context in different ways. Some techniques identify the location using barcodes that assign coordinates or labels to the DNA molecules to map the location back to the original tissue, whereas others allow researchers to visualize the exact spatial context directly.

=== Type of Methylation marks captured ===
Spatial DNA methylation profiling mostly focus on identifying 5mC and 5hmC in the genome; however, the ability to differentiate between them depends on the methods used, as some techniques do such as methylation mark staining and others do not, such as spatial-DMT. Methylation mark staining offers additional flexibility, by using antibodies that target 5-formylcytosine and 5-carboxylcytosine. Assessing with these marks also allows for sub-populations of cells to be identified, as well as partially methylated regions which may hold significant information. The methylation marks can also be mapped over time, allowing researchers to better understand developmental processes.

=== Throughput ===
As spatial DNA methylation profiling techniques have developed over time with the introduction of sequencing technologies, this led to increasing throughput, improving the understanding of DNA methylation patterns with the larger amounts of data obtained. There is also increasing complexity with respect to data analysis and interpretation, as opposed to imaging-based methods which focus on overall methylation patterns making it more easily interpretable.

== Applications & limitations ==
=== Developmental biology ===
Spatial DMT has been applied to mouse embryos to map tissue-specific methylation patterns in early development. Targeting embryos during development allows tracking of lineage-specific epigenetic modifications and understanding the coordination of methylation and transcription. Also, researchers can observe how epigenetic modifications can shape organogenesis.

=== Cancer biology ===
Tumours exhibit changing methylation patterns in different spatial contexts.

=== Disease modelling & aging ===
5mC immunostaining has been used to look at the changing methylation states during both embryonic development and cellular senescence. Spatial approaches can help add information to distinguish between localized epigenetic modifications that cause disruptions associated with aging and disease.

=== Limitations ===
Despite the rapid advances and promise the field holds, several limitations remain:

- Trade-offs between resolution and genome coverage
- Limited ability to detect diverse methylation changes
- High cost
- High technical complexity
- DNA degradation during tissue processing

Until spatial DMT was created, measurements of spatial DNA measurements had to be inferred from histone modifications, chromatin changes, and transcriptomics. Spatial DMT and other spatial DNA methylation technologies struggle with low-input samples, as they require bisulfite sequencing to get high quality data. Bisulfite sequencing also has a tradeoff with coverage and resolution. Other limitations found with Spatial DMT include challenges with degraded states of DNA and paraffin fixing.

== Note ==
ChatGPT was used as a search engine to search for sources related to the topic. All sources were read and verified by authors of this article.
