= Correlation function (disambiguation) =

Correlation function may refer to:

- Correlation function, correlation between random variables at two different points in space or time
- Correlation function (quantum field theory), matrix element computed by inserting a product of operators between two states
- Correlation function (statistical mechanics), measure of the order in a system
- Correlation function (astronomy), distribution of galaxies in the universe
