= Zipalertinib =

Clinical data
- Other names: CLN-081, TAS-6417, TPC-064
- Drug class: EGFR inhibitor

Identifiers
- IUPAC name: N-[(8S)-4-amino-6-methyl-5-quinolin-3-yl-8,9-dihydropyrimido[5,4-b]indolizin-8-yl]prop-2-enamide
- CAS Number: 1661854-97-2
- PubChem CID: 117918742
- ChemSpider: 71117518
- UNII: T4YMU8TW9H
- KEGG: D13062
- ChEBI: CHEBI:233402
- ChEMBL: ChEMBL4650281

Chemical and physical data
- Formula: C_{23}H_{20}N_{6}O
- Molar mass: 396.454 g·mol^{−1}
- 3D model (JSmol): Interactive image
- SMILES: CC1=C[C@@H](CN2C1=C(C3=C(N=CN=C32)N)C4=CC5=CC=CC=C5N=C4)NC(=O)C=C
- InChI: InChI=InChI=1S/C23H20N6O/c1-3-18(30)28-16-8-13(2)21-19(15-9-14-6-4-5-7-17(14)25-10-15)20-22(24)26-12-27-23(20)29(21)11-16/h3-10,12,16H,1,11H2,2H3,(H,28,30)(H2,24,26,27)/t16-/m0/s1; Key:MKCYPWYURWOKST-INIZCTEOSA-N

Seo D, Lim JH (May 2024). "Targeted Therapies for EGFR Exon 20 Insertion Mutation in Non-Small-Cell Lung Cancer". International Journal of Molecular Sciences. 25 (11): 5917. doi:10.3390/ijms25115917. PMC 11172945. PMID 38892105.

Zipalertinib is an investigational new drug that is being evaluated for the treatment of non-small cell lung cancer (NSCLC) with EGFR mutations, particularly exon 20 insertion mutations.
