= Spatial biology =

Subfield

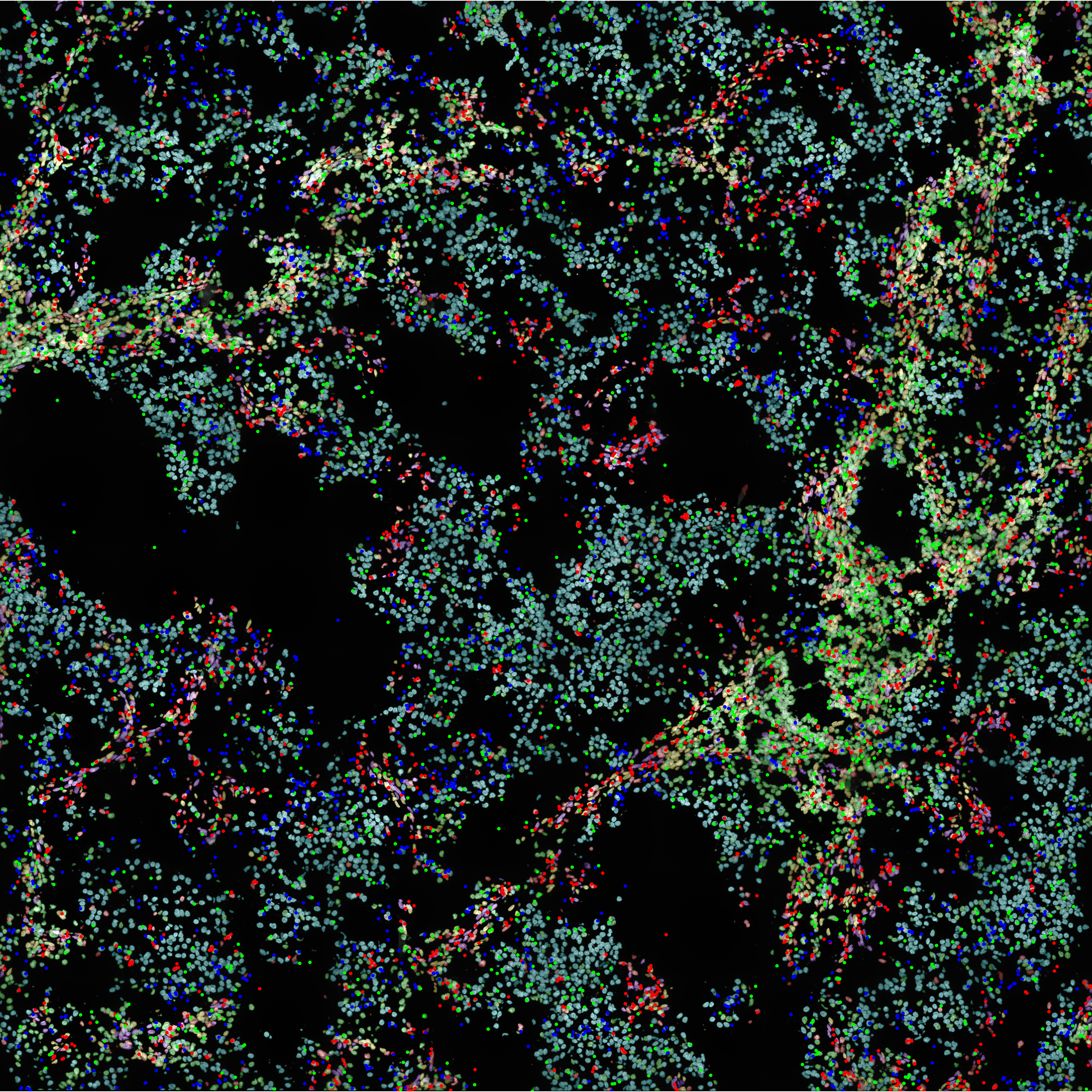
Integration of data from a confocal microscopy image and spatial transcriptomics data on human medulloblastoma.

Spatial biology is the field of biology that visualizes the spatial organization of biomolecules in tissues.The term "spatial biology" is mostly used in the context of high-throughput techniques that detect distribution of biomolecules, a field also called spatial omics.

Spatial biology encompasses different levels of cellular resolution including (1) subcellular localization of DNA, RNA, and proteins, (2) single-cell resolution and in situ communications like cell-cell interactions and cell signaling, (3) cellular neighborhoods, regions, or microenvironments, and (4) tissue architecture and organization in organs. Dysregulation of tissue organization is a common feature in human disease progression including tumorigenesis and neurodegeneration.

== Spatial omics ==
Spatial omics imaging methods include multiple techniques combining spatial information with omics data. They include spatial transcriptomics (Nature Method of the Year 2020), spatial proteomics (Nature Method of the Year 2024), spatial lipidomics, peptidomics, metabolomics (all usually enabled through mass spectrometry imaging such as MALDI or DESI), and spatial methylomics.

=== Spatial transcriptomics ===
Spatial transcriptomics measures mRNA transcript abundance and distribution in situ across a tissue. Spatial method for RNA in situ detection is first described in a 1969 landmark paper by Joseph G. Gall and Mary-Lou Pardue. Previous to spatial transcriptomics techniques, whole transcriptome profiling lacked spatial context because tissues were ground up in bulk RNA-seq or dissociated into single cells suspensions in single cell RNA-seq. Although some literature refers to "spatial genomics" for RNA, growing consensus has settled on usage of "spatial transcriptomics" or "spatially resolved transcriptomics."

=== Spatial proteomics ===
Spatial proteomics measures the localization and abundance of proteins at the subcellular level across a tissue. Immunohistochemistry-based spatial proteomic methods include oligo barcoded antibodies, cyclic immunofluorescence (cycIF), co-detection by indexing (CODEX), iterative bleaching extends multiplicity (IBEX), multiplexed ion beam imaging (MIBI) and imaging mass cytometry (IMC). Other methods includes deep visual proteomics that profile protein expression in single cells by laser capture microdissection and mass spectroscopy. The term "spatial medicine" is recently coined by Eric Topol to refer to a study that used deep visual proteomics to find a therapeutic treatment for patients with a rare skin condition.

=== Spatial genomics ===
Spatial genomics localizes the native three dimensional genome architecture within the nucleus. Nuclear organization of chromosomes and how chromosomes are positioned and folded has implications for gene regulation, transcription, DNA replication, DNA damage repair, and cell division.

=== Spatial multi-omics ===
Analysis of spatial multi-omics datasets first requires co-registration of the individual scans, so that they can be visualized as a stack and share a common coordinate system. This enables analyzing one modality (e.g. conventional hematoxylin-eaosin stained histology) and then utilizing the generated masks or polygons to compare statistics of another modality (e.g. transcriptome from a spatial transcriptomics scan)

== Spatial Fibrosis Quantification ==
Spatial fibrosis quantification refers to digital pathology computational approaches that measure not only the amount of fibrotic tissue in aggregate but use image analysis methods to segment single collagen fibers and resolve their quantitative features spatially (e.g. with specific tissue coordinates).

The amount of information associated to each fiber object vary depending on the image analysis strategies and analytical methods, and characteristics of the source image.

Recent advances in digital pathology and image analysis enable fibrosis to be resolved at the single-fiber level, allowing objective quantification of collagen fiber length, width, density, orientation, branching, and network complexity.

These spatial metrics provide insights into tissue remodeling, mechanical properties, and disease progression that are not captured by traditional semi-quantitative staging systems. Such fibrotypes can be used for patient stratification, disease subtyping, and evaluation of therapeutic response in clinical and translational studies.

In addition, single-fiber datasets (.phn open source format) can be integrated with other spatial biology modalities as described in this section enabling the registration of tissue architecture with molecular and cellular features and thereby bridging histology with biological mechanisms.

== See also ==
- Visible Embryo Project (VEP)
- Spatial transcriptomics
