= Herty =

Herty may refer to:

- Charles Herty (1867–1938), American academic, scientist, and businessman
- Herty Advanced Materials Development Center, a research facility in Savannah, Georgia
- Herty Field, a sports facility at the University of Georgia
- Herty Lewites (1939–2006), a Nicaraguan politician
- Herty Medal, an award presented by the American Chemical Society
- Herty, Texas, an unincorporated community in Angelina County, Texas
- SS Charles H. Herty, a United States Marine Corps ship
