= Dust Cave =

Archaeological site in Alabama

Coordinates: 34°46′41″N 87°43′26″W

Dust Cave is a Paleoindian archaeology site located in northern Alabama. It is in the Highland Rim in the limestone bluffs that overlook Coffee Slough, a tributary of the Tennessee River. The site was occupied during the Pleistocene and early Holocene eras. 1LU496, another name for Dust Cave, was occupied seasonally for 7,000 years. The cave was discovered in 1984 by Dr. Richard Cobb and initially excavated in 1989 under Dr. Boyce Driskell from the University of Alabama.

Other major Paleoindian sites in northern Alabama include Stanfield-Worley, Mulberry Creek, the Quad site and Heaven's Half Acre.

== Site description ==
The cave became habitable at 10,600 B.P. due to the water tables dropping and flushing river sediment that once filled and buried the cave between 17,000 and 15,000 B.P. The site represents five cultural components. These are Quad/Beaver Lake/Dalton (10,650-9200 cal B.C.), Early Side-Notched (10,000-9000 cal B.C.), Kirk Stemmed (8200-5800 cal B.C.), Eva/Morrow Mountain (6400-4000 cal B.C.), and Benton (4500-3600 cal B.C.). The stratigraphic profile of the cave is made up of zones labeled A through Y. A is considered the youngest and Y, determined to have been from the Pleistocene, the oldest.

== Excavation ==
During the first field season (1989) five 30 by 30 centimeter test units were excavated that were one meter deep. The test unit A was enlarged to 160 centimeters by the end of the season. This unit exposed a complex layering that included 20 human and dog burials associated with a phase in the Middle Archaic.

In the 1990 and 1991 field seasons seven test units were excavated and they went down to bedrock. These units are labeled A through G. During the 1992, 1993, and 1994 seasons a 2 by 12 meter trench was excavated. This revealed the stratigraphic composition of the cave. Excavations still occurred from 1996 to 2002, with 2002 being the concluding field season for the site.

== Lithics ==
The first lithic analysis was conducted on 130 chipped stone tools from the test unit F. These stone tools came from one of the units that had been excavated down to bedrock. This unit was chosen for that reason and because it had representation from all of the five cultural components. Zones T and U represent the Paleoindian period. A reworked Cumberland point, Quad, Beaver Lake, Hardaway Side-Notched, and Dalton projectile points were found in these two units. These are all Paleoindian projectile points and date in between 12,650 and 11,200 cal B.P.

== Burials ==
Burials that were found in the cave originated in Zone N and extended into Zone P. These zones mark the period between the Kirk Stemmed occupation and the Eva/Morrow Mountain component. The Eva/Morrow Mountain occupations represent the most intensive periods of human activity at Dust Cave.

== Selected publications ==
2010 British Archaeological Reports “The Hunter-gatherer Use of Caves and Rockshelters”.

2009 Erin E. Pritchard "The Dust Cave Archaeological Project, Lauderdale County, Alabama" TVA Archaeology: Seventy-five Years of Prehistoric Site Research. Knoxville: University of Tennessee, 235.

2009 Kandace D. Hollenbach “Foraging in the Tennessee River Valley, 12,500 to 8,000 Years Ago” Tuscaloosa: University of Alabama.

2007 Renee Beauchamp Walker “Foragers of the Terminal Pleistocene in North America” Lincoln: University of Nebraska.

2001 S. C. Sherwood and P. Goldberg. A Geoarchaeological Framework for the Study of Karstic Cave Sites in the Eastern Woodlands. Midcontinental Journal of Archaeology. 26(2): 145–167.

2001 S. C. Sherwood and J. F. Simek (editors). Cave Archaeology in the Eastern Woodlands. Special issue of the Midcontinental Journal of Archaeology 26(2).

2001 S. C. Sherwood "The Geoarchaeology of the Late Pleistocene through Early Holocene at Dust Cave." Paper presented at the 58th Annual Meeting of the Southeastern Archaeological Conference, Chattanooga, TN.

2001 S. C. Sherwood and P. Goldberg "Recognition and Organization of Prepared Surfaces at Dust Cave: A Microstratigraphic Approach" Paper presented at the 66th Annual Meeting for the Society of American Archaeology, New Orleans, LA.

2000 S. C. Sherwood and P. Goldberg "The Stratigraphy Of Dust Cave And Basket Cave In The Context Of The Middle Tennessee River Valley" Paper presented at the National Speleological Society Convention, Elkins West Virginia.

2000 Scott C. Meeks “The Use and Function of Late Middle Archaic Projectile Points in the Midsouth” Moundville, Ala. (13075 Moundville Archaeological Park, Moundville 35474): Office of Archaeological Services, University of Alabama Museums.
