= Shoop Site (36DA20) =

- U.S. National Register of Historic Places
- Location within Pennsylvania Location within the United States
- Location: East of Enders, Jackson Township and Wayne Township, Pennsylvania
- Coordinates: 40°29′14″N 76°49′12″W
- Area: 90 acres (36 ha)
- NRHP reference No.: 86000241
- Added to NRHP: February 13, 1986

Shoop Site (designated 33DA20) is a prehistoric archaeological site in Jackson Township and Wayne Township, Dauphin County, Pennsylvania, United States. It is the site of a large Paleoindian campsite, dated to 9,000-9,500 BCE. It was first discovered in the 1930s by George Gordon, and also studied by Frank Soday who later discovered the Quad site. In the decades since its discovery, the site has yielded approximately 7,000 artifacts scattered over at least 37 acres for lithic analysis. Additionally, there is a large number of “astoundingly reworked” fluted Projectile points and endscrapers, and fully 98% of the artifacts are made from a lithic material that originates hundreds of miles away.

It was added to the National Register of Historic Places in 1986.
