= Methoxyflurane =

Volatile anaesthesia medication

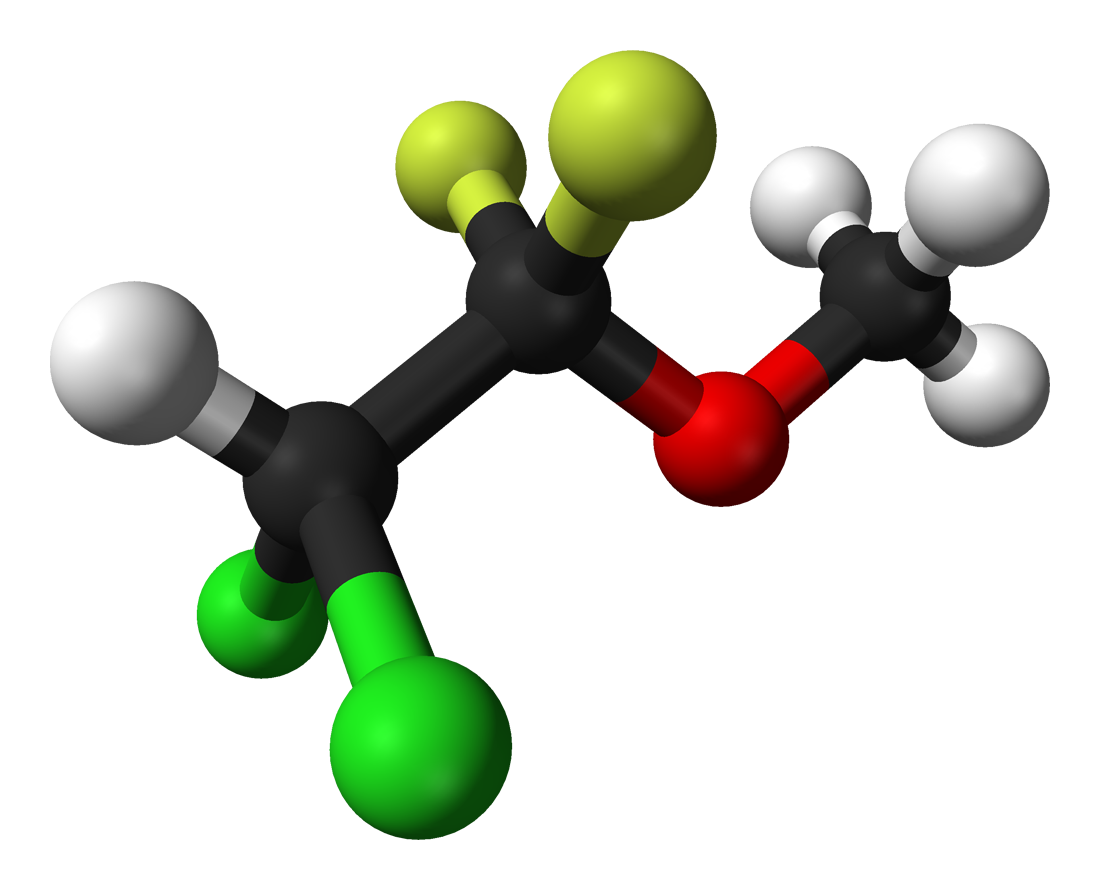

Clinical data
- Trade names: Penthrox, others
- Other names: 2,2-dichloro-1,1-difluoroethyl methyl ether
- AHFS/Drugs.com: Consumer Drug Information
- Pregnancy category: AU: C
- Routes of administration: Inhalation
- Drug class: Volatile anesthetic
- ATC code: N02BG09 (WHO)

Legal status
- Legal status: AU: S4 (Prescription only); BR: Class C1 (Other controlled substances); CA: ℞-only; UK: POM (Prescription only); US: Withdrawn from market; EU: Rx-only

Pharmacokinetic data
- Metabolism: 70%
- Onset of action: Rapid after 6-10 breaths
- Duration of action: Typically up to 30–60 minutes depending on the frequency of breaths

Identifiers
- IUPAC name: 2,2-dichloro-1,1-difluoro-1-methoxyethane
- CAS Number: 76-38-0
- PubChem CID: 4116
- DrugBank: DB01028
- ChemSpider: 3973
- UNII: 30905R8O7B
- KEGG: D00544
- ChEBI: CHEBI:6843
- ChEMBL: ChEMBL1341
- CompTox Dashboard (EPA): DTXSID7025556
- ECHA InfoCard: 100.000.870

Chemical and physical data
- Formula: C_{3}H_{4}Cl_{2}F_{2}O
- Molar mass: 164.96 g·mol^{−1}
- 3D model (JSmol): Interactive image
- SMILES: ClC(Cl)C(F)(F)OC
- InChI: InChI=1S/C3H4Cl2F2O/c1-8-3(6,7)2(4)5/h2H,1H3; Key:RFKMCNOHBTXSMU-UHFFFAOYSA-N

Methoxyflurane, sold under the brand name Penthrox (the "green whistle") among others, is an inhaled medication primarily used to reduce pain following an injury. It may also be used to reduce pain associated with minor medical procedures. Onset of pain relief is rapid and a standard dose typically lasts for up to 30 minutes. Use is only recommended with direct medical supervision.

Common side effects include anxiety, headache, sleepiness, cough, and nausea. Serious side effects may include kidney problems, liver problems, low blood pressure, and severe anaesthetic reactions such as malignant hyperthermia. It may be used during pregnancy or breastfeeding, however there may be additional harmful side effects. It is only recommended in those who have a normal level of consciousness and stable blood pressure and heart rate. It is classified as a volatile anaesthetic.

It was first made in 1948 by William T. Miller and came into medical use in the 1960s. It was used as a general anesthetic from its introduction in 1960 until the late 1970s. In 1999, the manufacturer discontinued methoxyflurane in the United States, and in 2005 the Food and Drug Administration withdrew it from the market, due to reports of nephrotoxicity and hepatotoxicity. As of April 2025, it is used in New Zealand, Australia, Canada, Ireland, and the United Kingdom for acute pain.

== Medical use ==
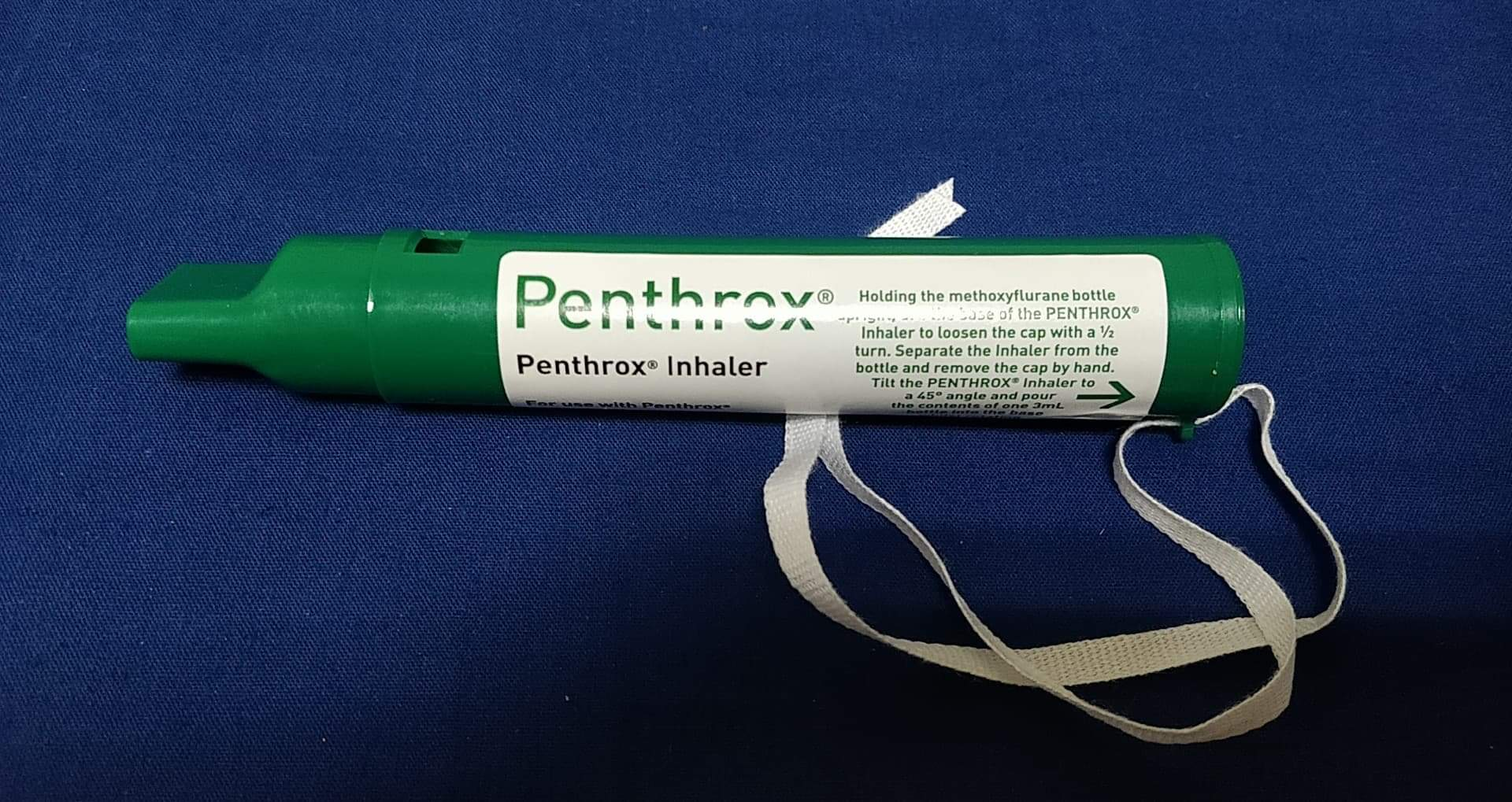
Methoxyflurane handheld inhaler

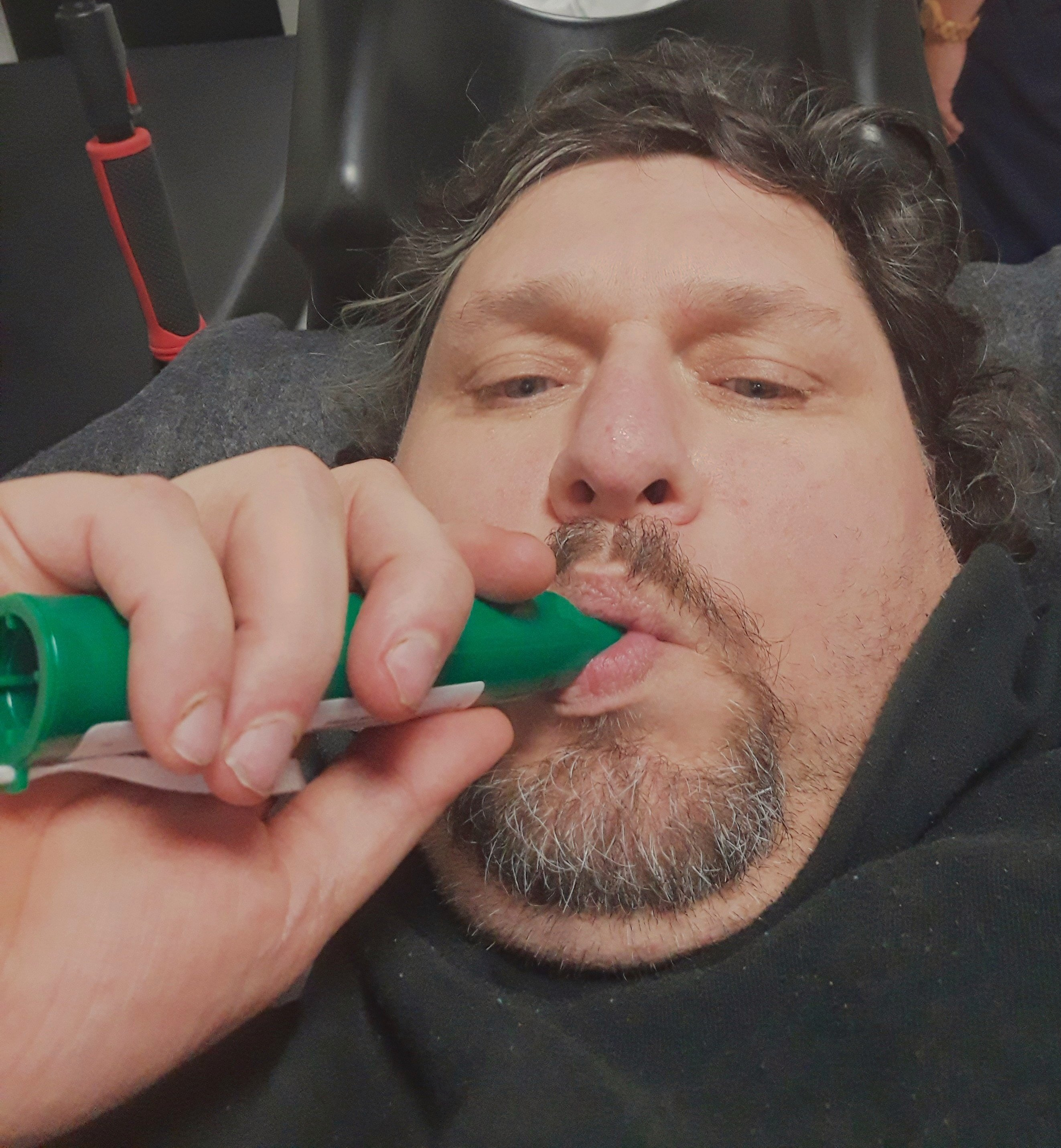
Patient self-administering Penthrox at a hospital in Australia

Methoxyflurane is used for relief of moderate or severe pain as a result of trauma. It may also be used for short episodes of pain as a result of procedures.

Each dose lasts approximately 30 minutes. Pain relief begins after 6–8 breaths and continues for several minutes after stopping inhalation. The maximum recommended dose is 6 milliliters per day or 15 milliliters per week because of the risk of kidney problems, and it is not recommended to be used on consecutive days. Despite the potential for kidney problems when used at anesthetic doses, no significant adverse effects have been reported when it is used at the lower doses (up to 6 milliliters) used for pain relief. Due to the risk of kidney toxicity, methoxyflurane is contraindicated in people with pre-existing kidney disease or diabetes mellitus, and is not recommended to be administered in conjunction with tetracyclines or other potentially nephrotoxic or enzyme-inducing drugs.

It is self-administered to children and adults using a hand-held inhaler device. A non-opioid alternative to morphine, it is also easier to use than nitrous oxide. A portable, disposable, single-use inhaler device, along with a single 3 milliliter brown glass vial of methoxyflurane allows people who are conscious and hemodynamically stable (including children over the age of 5 years) to self-administer the medication, under supervision.

In prehospital care Penthrox offers an alternative to Entonox, it being smaller, lighter and not contraindicated with chest injuries.

== Side effects ==
The current consensus is that the use of methoxyflurane should be restricted only to healthy individuals and only at dosages less than 2.5 MAC hours. The National Institute for Occupational Safety and Health maintains a recommended exposure limit for methoxyflurane as waste anesthetic gas of 2 ppm (13.5 mg/m^{3}) over 60 minutes. The Australian Medicines Handbook recommends no more than 6mL in one day, and no more than 15mL in a 7-day period.

=== Kidney ===
An association between methoxyflurane and acute kidney injury was first reported in a 1964 case study of three patients. Another report was published in 1966, in which 17 of 95 patients (18%) who received methoxyflurane as a general anaesthetic developed vasopressin and fluid challenge-resistant high-output kidney failure (production of large volumes of poorly concentrated urine) and deranged serum electrolytes. Most of these cases resolved within 2–3 weeks, but evidence of renal dysfunction persisted in some patients for more than one year.

Compared with halothane, methoxyflurane produces dose-dependent abnormalities in kidney function. The authors showed that subclinical nephrotoxicity occurred following methoxyflurane at minimum alveolar concentration (MAC) for 2.5 to 3 hours (2.5 to 3 MAC hours), while overt toxicity was present in all patients at dosages greater than 5 MAC hours. This study provided a model that would be used for the assessment of the nephrotoxicity of volatile anesthetics for the next two decades. Furthermore, the concurrent use of tetracyclines and methoxyflurane has been reported to result in fatal renal toxicity.

=== Liver ===
Reports of severe and even fatal hepatotoxicity related to the use of methoxyflurane began to appear in 1966.

=== Mechanism ===
The biodegradation of methoxyflurane begins immediately. The kidney and liver toxicity observed after anesthetic doses is attributable to one or more metabolites produced by O-demethylation of methoxyflurane. Products of this catabolic process include methoxyfluoroacetic acid (MFAA), dichloroacetic acid (DCAA), and inorganic fluoride. Methoxyflurane nephrotoxicity is dose dependent and irreversible, resulting from O-demethylation of methoxyflurane to fluoride and DCAA. It is not entirely clear whether the fluoride itself is toxic—it may simply be a surrogate measure for some other toxic metabolite. The concurrent formation of inorganic fluoride and DCAA is unique to methoxyflurane biotransformation compared with other volatile anesthetics, and this combination is more toxic than fluoride alone. This may explain why fluoride formation from methoxyflurane is associated with nephrotoxicity, while fluoride formation from other volatile anesthetics (such as enflurane and sevoflurane) is not.

== Pharmacokinetics ==
Methoxyflurane has a very high lipid solubility, which gives it very slow pharmacokinetics (induction and emergence characteristics); this being undesirable for routine application in the clinical setting. Initial studies performed in 1961 revealed that in unpremedicated healthy individuals, induction of general anesthesia with methoxyflurane-oxygen alone or with nitrous oxide was difficult or even impossible using the vaporizers available at that time. It was found to be necessary to administer an intravenous anesthetic agent such as sodium thiopental to ensure a smooth and rapid induction. It was further found that after thiopental induction, it was necessary to administer nitrous oxide for at least ten minutes before a sufficient amount of methoxyflurane could accumulate in the bloodstream to ensure an adequate level of anesthesia. This was despite using high flow (litres per minute) of nitrous oxide and oxygen, and with the vaporizers delivering the maximum possible concentration of methoxyflurane.

Similar to its induction pharmacokinetics, methoxyflurane has very slow and somewhat unpredictable emergence characteristics. During initial clinical studies in 1961, the average time to emergence after discontinuation of methoxyflurane was 59 minutes after administration of methoxyflurane for an average duration of 87 minutes. The longest time to emergence was 285 minutes, after 165 minutes of methoxyflurane administration.

== Pharmacodynamics ==
=== Heart ===
The effects of methoxyflurane on the circulatory system resemble those of diethyl ether. In dogs, methoxyflurane anesthesia causes a moderate decrease in blood pressure with minimal changes in heart rate, and no significant effect on blood sugar, epinephrine, or norepinephrine. Bleeding and increased arterial partial pressure of carbon dioxide (PaCO_{2}) both induce further decreases in blood pressure, as well as increases in blood glucose, epinephrine and norepinephrine. In humans, methoxyflurane produces some decrease in blood pressure, but cardiac output, stroke volume, and total peripheral resistance are only minimally depressed. Its effect on the pulmonary circulation is negligible, and it does not predispose the heart to cardiac dysrhythmias.

=== Lungs ===
Unlike diethyl ether, methoxyflurane is a significant respiratory depressant. In dogs, methoxyflurane causes a dose-dependent decrease in respiratory rate and a marked decrease in respiratory minute volume, with a relatively mild decrease in tidal volume. In humans, methoxyflurane causes a dose-dependent decrease in tidal volume and minute volume, with respiratory rate relatively constant. The net effect of these changes is profound respiratory depression, as evidenced by CO_{2} retention with a concomitant decrease in arterial pH (this is referred to as a respiratory acidosis) when anesthetized subjects are allowed to breathe spontaneously for any length of time.

=== Pain ===
Although the high blood solubility of methoxyflurane is often undesirable, this property makes it useful in certain situations—it persists in the lipid compartment of the body for a long time, providing sedation and analgesia well into the postoperative period. There is substantial data to indicate that methoxyflurane is an effective analgesic and sedative agent at subanesthetic doses. Supervised self-administration of methoxyflurane in children and adults can briefly lead to deep sedation, and it has been used as a patient controlled analgesic for painful procedures in children in hospital emergency departments. During childbirth, administration of methoxyflurane produces significantly better analgesia, less psychomotor agitation, and only slightly more somnolence than trichloroethylene.

Penthrox, commonly known as the "green whistle", has been offered in hospital to women for painful intrauterine device procedures (insertion and removal).

=== Central nervous system ===
Similar to other inhalational anesthetics, the exact mechanism of action is not clearly defined and likely involves multiple molecular targets in the brain and spinal cord. Methoxyflurane is a positive allosteric modulator of GABA_{A} and glycine receptors as demonstrated in electrophysiology studies. This mechanism is shared with alcohols that produce general anesthesia.

== Chemical properties ==
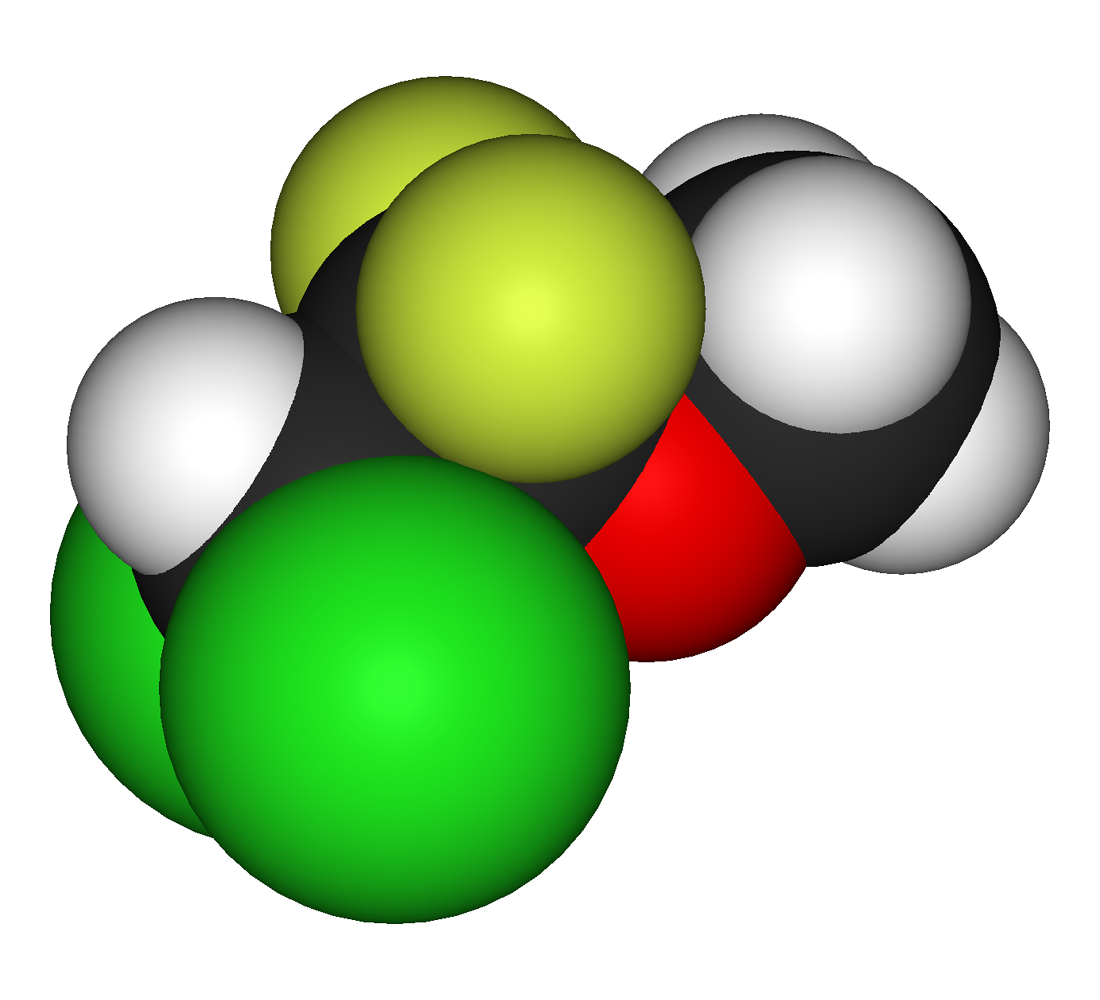
Space-filling model (three-dimensional molecular structure) of methoxyflurane

With a molecular formula of C_{3}H_{4}Cl_{2}F_{2}O and a condensed structural formula of CHCl_{2}CF_{2}OCH_{3}, the International Union of Pure and Applied Chemistry (IUPAC) name for methoxyflurane is 2,2-dichloro-1,1-difluoro-1-methoxyethane. It is a halogenated ether in form of a clear, colorless liquid, and its vapor has a strong fruity aroma. It is miscible with ethanol, acetone, chloroform, diethyl ether, and fixed oils. It is soluble in rubber.

With a minimum alveolar concentration (MAC) of 0.16%, methoxyflurane is an extremely potent anesthetic agent. It is a powerful analgesic agent at well below full anesthetic concentrations. Because of its low volatility and very high boiling point (104.8 °C at 1 atmosphere), methoxyflurane has a low vapor pressure at ambient temperature and atmospheric pressure. It is therefore quite difficult to vaporize methoxyflurane using conventional anesthetic vaporizers.

Property	Value
Boiling point (at 1 atmosphere)	104.8 °C
Minimum alveolar concentration (MAC)	0.16%
Vapor pressure (mmHg at 20 °C)	22.5
Partition coefficient (Blood:Gas)	12
Partition coefficient (Oil:Gas)	950
Partition coefficient (Oil:Water)	400
Specific gravity at 25 °C	1.42
Flash point	63 °C
Molecular weight (g mol^{−1})	164.97
Vapor-liquid equilibrium (mL)	208
Flammability limits	7% in air
Chemical stabilizer necessary	Yes

The carbon–fluorine bond, a component of all organofluorine compounds, is the strongest chemical bond in organic chemistry. Furthermore, this bond becomes shorter and stronger as more fluorine atoms are added to the same carbon on a given molecule. Because of this, fluoroalkanes are some of the most chemically stable organic compounds.

== History ==
Methoxyflurane has been used since the 1970s in Australia as an emergency analgesic for short-term use by the Australian Defence Force and New Zealand Defence Force, the Australian ambulance services, and both St John Ambulance and Wellington Free Ambulance in New Zealand. Since 2018, it has also been used by some emergency medical services in Germany and Austria. Methoxyflurane inhalers are nicknamed 'green whistles' due to the green colour of their casing.

All of the currently used volatile anesthetic agents are organofluorine compounds. Aside from the synthesis of Freon (Thomas Midgley Jr. and Charles F. Kettering, 1928) and the discovery of Teflon (Roy J. Plunkett, 1938), the field of organofluorine chemistry had not attracted a great deal of attention up to 1940 because of the extreme reactivity of elemental fluorine, which had to be produced in situ for use in chemical reactions. The development of organofluorine chemistry was a spin-off from the World War 2 nuclear Manhattan Project, during which elemental fluorine was produced on an industrial scale for the first time.

The need for fluorine arose from the need to separate the isotope uranium-235 (^{235}U) from uranium-238 (^{238}U) because the former, present in natural uranium at a concentration of less than 1% is fissile (capable of sustaining a nuclear chain reaction of nuclear fission with thermal neutrons), whereas the latter is not. Members of the MAUD Committee (especially Francis Simon and Nicholas Kurti) proposed the use of gaseous diffusion for isotope separation, since, according to Graham's law the rate of diffusion is inversely proportional to molecular mass. After an extensive search, uranium hexafluoride (UF_{6}) was determined to be the most suitable compound of uranium to be used for the gaseous diffusion process. Elemental fluorine is needed in the production of UF_{6}.

Obstacles had to be overcome in the handling of both fluorine and UF_{6}. Before the K-25 gaseous diffusion enrichment plant could be built, it was first necessary to develop non-reactive chemical compounds that could be used as coatings, lubricants and gaskets for the surfaces which would come into contact with the UF_{6} gas (a highly reactive and corrosive substance). William T. Miller, professor of organic chemistry at Cornell University, was co-opted to develop such materials, because of his expertise in organofluorine chemistry. Miller and his team developed several novel non-reactive chlorofluorocarbon polymers that were used in this application.

Miller and his team continued to develop organofluorine chemistry after the end of World War II and methoxyflurane was made in 1948.

In 1968, Robert Wexler of Abbott Laboratories developed the Analgizer, a disposable inhaler that allowed the self-administration of methoxyflurane vapor in air for analgesia. The Analgizer consisted of a polyethylene cylinder 5 inches long and 1 inch in diameter with a 1 inch long mouthpiece. The device contained a rolled wick of polypropylene felt which held 15 milliliters of methoxyflurane. Because of the simplicity of the Analgizer and the pharmacological characteristics of methoxyflurane, it was easy for patients to self-administer the drug and rapidly achieve a level of conscious analgesia which could be maintained and adjusted as necessary over a period of time lasting from a few minutes to several hours. The 15 milliliter supply of methoxyflurane would typically last for two to three hours, during which time the user would often be partly amnesic to the sense of pain; the device could be refilled if necessary. The Analgizer was found to be safe, effective, and simple to administer in obstetric patients during childbirth, as well as for patients with bone fractures and joint dislocations, and for dressing changes on burn patients. When used for labor analgesia, the Analgizer allows labor to progress normally and with no apparent adverse effect on Apgar scores. All vital signs remain normal in obstetric patients, newborns, and injured patients. The Analgizer was widely utilized for analgesia and sedation until the early 1970s, in a manner that foreshadowed the patient-controlled analgesia infusion pumps of today. The Analgizer inhaler was withdrawn in 1974, but use of methoxyflurane as a sedative and analgesic continues in Australia and New Zealand in the form of the Penthrox inhaler. During 2020 trials of methoxyflurane as an analgesic in emergency medicine were held in the UK.

In 2021, Oslo University Hospital and Innlandet Hospital Trust in Norway initiated a study showing that inhaled methoxyflurane is as effective as intravenous morphine for acute moderate to severe pain. The study was published in The Lancet. As of 2026, the fire service in Nordre Land Municipality has implemented the use of methoxyflurane inhalers for pain relief in cases of acute injury as part of its first-responder medical services.

== Legal status ==
Methoxyflurane has a varied legal status worldwide depending on its use. It was initially used as a general anesthetic in the 1960s and 1970s; however, its anesthetic application was discontinued due to risks of nephrotoxicity and hepatotoxicity at high doses. At lower doses, it has been approved as an analgesic for moderate-to-severe pain in many countries. In Australia and New Zealand, methoxyflurane has been widely used for over 40 years in emergency medicine and minor procedures. It is also authorized in the European Union, including the United Kingdom and Ireland, for trauma-related pain relief via a self-administered inhaler device (Penthrox). Methoxyflurane was withdrawn from the United States market in 2005, due to safety concerns but is now undergoing clinical trials for reintroduction as an analgesic. In Canada, it is approved for pain relief under strict guidelines. Its use remains prescription-only in most regions, reflecting ongoing caution regarding potential side effects like kidney and liver toxicity.
