= La Grange Rock Shelter =

Archaeological site in Alabama, United States

- U.S. National Register of Historic Places
- Nearest city: Leighton, Alabama
- Area: 1 acre (0.40 ha)
- NRHP reference No.: 74000406
- Added to NRHP: June 13, 1974

The LaGrange Rock Shelter is an archaeological site located on private property between Leighton and Muscle Shoals in Colbert County, Alabama, United States, near the original campus of LaGrange College. The shelter measures 70 feet long by 15 feet deep (21m by 4.5m) and is located beneath a sandstone outcrop overlooking a dense series of Paleoindian sites in the valley below, which may have led to it being chosen for excavation.

Excavations of the site occurred over two seasons, beginning in 1972 with Charles Hubbert as principal investigator and ending in 1975 with Vernon J. Knight Jr as principal investigator, with both seasons under the direction of David L. DeJarnette of the University of Alabama. Lower levels of the shelter produced charcoal samples that were radiocarbon dated to approximately 11,280 BC, placing estimates of the site's habitation within what is believed to be the Paleoindian Period. At the time of the discovery, only one other site east of the Mississippi River had been dated to that age.

The charcoal consisted of small flecks associated with light debitage below a definitive Early Archaic to Late Paleoindian (Dalton culture) zone. After careful consideration, DeJarnette and Knight suggested that the charcoal originated from an upper level and migrated to the lower level due to breakdown of the original shelter floor. Although the Paleoindian date may be questioned, the site also contained a remarkable Early Archaic burial, one of the oldest burials uncovered in the State of Alabama.

The site was listed on the National Register of Historic Places in 1974.
