= Jan Aaseth =

Norwegian physician and academic

- Born: 20 October 1943 (age 82); Norway
- Occupations: Research adviser and professor at Innlandet Hospital & Inland Norway University of Applied Sciences

Jan Olav Aaseth (born 20 October 1943) is a Norwegian physician, doctor of philosophy, professor, and research advisor in internal medicine, endocrinology, toxicology, and medical biochemistry. He worked at Oslo University Hospital and became an approved specialist in medical biochemistry in 1979, and later also approved in internal medicine and endocrinology.

Aaseth was appointed professor and head of the Department of Occupational Medicine at the University of Tromsø. Later he was head of the Medical Biochemistry and Endocrinology units at Innlandet Hospital, combined with an appointment as a professor at Inland Norway University of Applied Sciences.

In 1984, Aaseth became a member of the steering group of the Committee for Geomedicine of the Norwegian Academy of Science and Letters. He has been president of the Norwegian Association for the Study of Obesity.
