= William T. Miller =

American organic and nuclear chemist (1911–1998)

- Born: William Taylor Miller; August 24, 1911; Winston-Salem, North Carolina
- Died: November 15, 1998 (aged 87); Ithaca, New York
- Education: Duke University, Stanford University (Lilly Fellowship)
- Known for: Developed the polymer used in the first gaseous diffusion plant, making possible the separation of uranium-235 (^{235}U) from uranium-238 (^{238}U)
- Awards: American Chemical Society award for Creative Work in Fluorine Chemistry (1974); Moissan Centenary Medal (1986)
- Scientific career
- Fields: Chemistry
- Workplaces: Cornell University
- Doctoral advisor: Lucius A. Bigelow (1892–1973)
- Doctoral students: Fred Warren McLafferty (b. 1923)

William Taylor Miller (August 24, 1911 – November 15, 1998) was an American professor of organic chemistry at Cornell University. His experimental research included investigations into the mechanism of addition of halogens, especially fluorine, to hydrocarbons. His work focused primarily on the physical and chemical properties of fluorocarbons and chlorofluorocarbons, and the synthesis of novel electrophilic reagents.

Miller carried out research into chemically resistant materials from which he developed the chlorofluorocarbon polymer used in K-25, the first gaseous diffusion plant constructed for the separation of uranium isotopes. The K-25 plant was a crucial factor in the development of "Little Boy" and other early nuclear weapons. Miller was also the first to synthesize methoxyflurane, a volatile inhalational anesthetic.

== Early life and education ==
Miller was born in Winston-Salem, North Carolina, in 1911. He earned a bachelor's degree in 1932 and a doctoral degree in 1935, both from Duke University. He was a Lilly Fellow at Stanford University from 1935 until 1936.

== Early career ==
Miller came to the Chemistry Department at Cornell University as an instructor in late 1936. His research focused on organofluorine chemistry, especially the synthesis of chemically non-reactive chlorofluorocarbons.

== Manhattan Project ==
In 1942, at the outset of the Manhattan Project, three methods of uranium enrichment were under consideration: gaseous diffusion, thermal diffusion, and electromagnetic separation. The gaseous diffusion method involves passing uranium hexafluoride (UF_{6}) gas through a series of semipermeable membranes to achieve the separation of the fissionable uranium-235 (^{235}U) isotope from the more abundant but non-fissile isotope uranium-238 (^{238}U). It was first necessary however to develop non-reactive chemical compounds that could be used as coatings, lubricants and gaskets for the surfaces which would come into contact with the UF_{6} gas, which is a highly reactive and corrosive substance. Because of Miller's expertise in organofluorine chemistry, he was recruited by scientists of the Manhattan Project to synthesize and develop such materials. Miller and his team succeeded in developing several novel non-reactive chlorofluorocarbon polymers, making possible the construction of the K-25 gaseous diffusion plant in Oak Ridge, Tennessee that produced the uranium for some of the first nuclear weapons. For this effort, U.S. Army Major General Leslie Groves, the military leader of the Manhattan Project, sent Miller a letter of commendation, which read,

"I wish to express my appreciation to you for the contribution you made to the development of the atomic bomb. The engineering research work you carried out resulted in the development of certain materials needed in the large production plant and was essential to our success."

Miller's research during the Manhattan Project also included the first chemical synthesis of methoxyflurane, a halogenated ether that was in clinical use as an inhalational anesthetic from 1960 until around 1974.

== Later career ==
Miller became a full professor in 1947, and remained in that position until his retirement in 1977. Miller chaired the committees that planned the construction of the Spencer T. Olin Research tower and the renovation of Baker Laboratory which occurred from 1968 to 1975. Miller was also a founding member of Kendall at Ithaca, a residential retirement community organized by retired Cornell faculty.

== Selected publications ==
Click here to see a list of some of Miller's more important publications.

== Awards, honors and societies ==
In 1974, Miller received the American Chemical Society award for Creative Work in Fluorine Chemistry, and in 1986 in Paris he won the Moissan Centenary Medal (named for Henri Moissan, who discovered fluorine in 1886. To honor Miller's seventieth birthday, an entire issue of the Journal of Fluorine Chemistry was dedicated to Miller as a festschrift in 1981. A professorship in the Chemistry Department at Cornell University is named in his honor. Miller was a member of the American Chemical Society and the Royal Society of Chemistry.

== Legacy ==
Of the three competing uranium enrichment methods developed by the Manhattan Project, gaseous diffusion is the only one that continued to be used today.
