= Charles N. Reilley =

American analytical chemist (1925–1981)

- Born: Charles Norwood Reilley; March 2, 1925; Charlotte, North Carolina, U.S.
- Died: December 31, 1981 (aged 56); Chapel Hill, North Carolina, U.S.
- Education: University of North Carolina at Chapel Hill; Princeton University
- Known for: Contributions to electrochemistry, chemometrics, and analytical instrumentation
- Awards: American Chemical Society Award in Analytical Chemistry (1965); Herty Medal (1968); ANACHEM Award (1972); National Academy of Sciences (1977)
- Scientific career
- Fields: Analytical chemistry
- Workplaces: University of North Carolina at Chapel Hill
- Doctoral advisor: N. Howell Furman

Charles Norwood Reilley (March 2, 1925 – December 31, 1981) was an American chemist known for his contributions to analytical chemistry, particularly in electrochemistry, chemical instrumentation, and the development of modern quantitative methods. He was a professor at the University of North Carolina at Chapel Hill and was elected to the National Academy of Sciences in 1977.

== Early life and education ==
Reilley was born in Charlotte, North Carolina. His father died when he was young, and he was raised by his mother, a public school teacher. He developed an early interest in electronics and science, which led him to pursue chemistry.

He received a B.S. in chemistry from the University of North Carolina at Chapel Hill in 1947, followed by an M.A. (1951) and Ph.D. (1952) from Princeton University, where he worked under analytical chemist N. Howell Furman.

== Career ==
After completing his doctorate, Reilley returned to the University of North Carolina at Chapel Hill, where he spent his entire academic career. He rose through the ranks from instructor to professor and was appointed Kenan Professor in 1963.

Reilley played a role in modernizing chemical education, advocating for the early integration of instrumental analysis into undergraduate curricula. His reforms helped establish UNC as an institution for undergraduate chemistry education in the 1960s and 1970s.

He was widely regarded as a teacher and mentor, known for his ability to engage colleagues and students alike in intellectually stimulating discussions that advanced their understanding of science.

Over the course of his career, he made contributions across multiple areas of analytical chemistry, including electrochemistry, chromatography, complexation chemistry, nuclear magnetic resonance spectroscopy, and laboratory automation.

== Research and contributions ==
- Electrochemistry and titrimetry: He developed theoretical models for electrochemical detection methods, including high-frequency titrimetry and coulometric titrations, and designed instrumentation for precise current control.
- Metal complex chemistry: He advanced understanding of metal–ligand equilibria, including the thermodynamic basis of the chelate effect, and developed widely used analytical reagents and methods for metal ion detection.
- Spectroscopy and NMR: He pioneered the use of nuclear magnetic resonance spectroscopy to study metal complexes and protonation equilibria.
- Chromatography and separations: He contributed to developments in gas–liquid chromatography and related analytical separation and kinetic methods.
- Chemometrics and computing: He was among the first to apply pattern recognition and early computational methods to chemical data, helping to establish the field of chemometrics.

Reilley also developed practical analytical tools, including a galvanic electrode for measuring dissolved oxygen in natural waters, which was widely adopted in environmental chemistry.

== Honors and awards ==
- American Chemical Society Award in Analytical Chemistry (Fisher Award, 1965)
- Herty Medal (1968)
- Charles H. Stone Award (1971)
- ANACHEM Award (1972)
- Manufacturing Chemists Association College Chemistry Teaching Award (1975)
- In 1977, he was elected to the National Academy of Sciences.

== Legacy ==
Following his death in 1981, the Society for Electroanalytical Chemistry established the Charles N. Reilley Award in electroanalytical chemistry in his honor, first awarded in 1984.
