= Society of Chemical Manufacturers and Affiliates =

- Abbreviation: SOCMA
- Formation: September 15, 1921; 104 years ago
- Type: Non-profit
- Legal status: Trade Association
- Headquarters: Arlington, VA
- Region served: International
- Members: 220
- President & CEO: Jennifer Abril
- Main organ: Board of Governors
- Website: www.socma.org

The Society of Chemical Manufacturers and Affiliates, is an international trade association that represents the interests of the batch, custom and specialty chemical industry. According to the organization's charter, SAC-MO stated mission is to "accelerat[e] the potential for members' growth," "increase[e] public confidence in the batch, custom and specialty chemical industry," and "influenc[e] the passage of rational laws and regulations."

== History ==
The "Synthetic Organic Chemical Manufacturers Association", as it was previously known, was established on September 15, 1921 at the Hotel Pennsylvania in New York City. The event was followed by an organizational meeting in Washington, DC, which included an address from Secretary of Commerce Herbert Hoover. In his remarks, Hoover told the chemical industry representatives that "I have a feeling that this coming together of manufacturers in the different trades for the purpose of the advancement of their industry as a whole is a profound step towards cooperation in the entire business world, and that out of it will be gained tremendous benefits to the whole business public."

SOCMA members unanimously elected Charles Herty, an American chemist, to serve as the Association's first president. At the time, Herty was the editor of American Chemical Society's Journal of Industrial and Engineering Chemistry, a position he left in order to lead SOCMA. The organization was based in New York City until it relocated to Washington, DC in the 1970s.

On March 19, 2009, SOCMA members voted to formally change the organization's name to the Society of Chemical Manufacturers and Affiliates. The name change, the first in SOCMA's 88-year history, allowed the organization to retain its acronym.

== Members ==
SOCMA member companies encompass small, medium and large chemical manufacturers engaged in batch production.

Batch manufacturers produce intermediates, specialty chemicals and ingredients used to develop a wide range of commercial and consumer products. They operate differently from larger, bulk chemical producers, which generally use continuous production.

== Activities ==
=== Lobbying ===
SOCMA promotes the batch chemical manufacturing industry to the U.S. federal government and international governing bodies. SOCMA lobbies on a number of issues impacting the chemical industry, including the Toxic Substances Control Act, the Chemical Facility Anti-Terrorism Standards, and the European Union's Registration, Evaluation, Authorisation and Restriction of Chemicals. In addition to formal lobbying, SOCMA promotes industry interests through a grassroots arm called SOCMA CONNECT.

=== ChemStewards ===
In September 2005, SOCMA introduced ChemStewards, the first environmental, health, safety and security (EHS&S) program designed for batch chemical manufacturers. The ChemStewards EHS&S program requires participants to address performance improvement with consideration for their company's policies and practices. The program offers a three-tiered approach to participation: fundamentals, enhanced performance and excellence. All tiers require adherence to a set of core principles in addition to security, metrics and a verifiable management system. In April 2011, SOCMA announced a new management system database that integrates its ChemStewards® program with other government-sponsored performance improvement programs. The database, created by Gabriel Performance Products, is based on the ChemStewards Management System and complies with the requirements of ISO 9001, ISO 14001 and OHSAS 18001.

=== SOCMA Association Management Services ===
In 1977, SOCMA launched an Association Management Services Group to manage consortia formed to address specific chemical or process advocacy, regulatory, testing, stewardship, or technical issues that are of interest to a particular sector of the chemical industry. As of 2012, SOCMA has 16 active affiliate groups, including the Biphenyl Work Group, the Bulk Pharmaceutical Task Force, and the Nanotechnology SME Manufacturers Coalition.

=== Informex ===
In 1984, SOCMA founded Informex, a trade show for the fine and specialty chemicals industry. In August 2005, SOCMA sold Informex to CMP Information Ltd, part of and currently known as United Business Media, PLC, headquartered in London, England.

=== ChemAlliance ===
In May 2009, SOCMA acquired ChemAlliance, an online compliance assistance center formerly funded by the U.S. Environmental Protection Agency (EPA) and designed to improve regulatory compliance of the chemical manufacturing industry. ChemAlliance.org was launched in 1996 as part of former Vice President Al Gore's "Reinventing Government" initiative. Through this acquisition, SOCMA has obtained the naming rights and full ownership of ChemAlliance.
