= Heaven's Half Acre (archaeological site) =

The Heaven's Half Acre complex is a concentration of Paleoindian sites situated on a series of Pleistocene terraces overlooking a sinkhole in northeastern Colbert County, Alabama, near the town of Leighton. Over one hundred and fifty fluted points have been recovered on these sites, making it one of the most dense fluted point localities in North America.

== Setting ==
The complex was discovered by Horace Holland of Leighton, Alabama, a teacher at Colbert County High School and member of the Alabama Archaeological Society, who was interested in Alabama prehistory and often took his students on field trips to collect artifacts. The site Holland discovered is designated as Alabama State Site 1Ct161, and is located in the approximate center of the complex on an eroded knoll descending into the sinkhole.

The remaining twenty or so fluted point sites are located on an undulating series of small natural mounds surrounding this large karstic pond. The knolls vary in elevation from 550 feet 580 feet AMSL, and most of these spots would have been in view of one another through during the Pleistocene Period. A thousand meters or so in all directions, the land rises gently back to the valley floor, enclosing the sites in a karstic basin. Since Holland's discovery, professional and avocational archaeologists have been aware of the occurrence of Clovis and Cumberland fluted points in abundance within this complex, and almost every high spot within the locale exhibits evidence of culture.

== Professional study ==
In conjunction with the Office of Archaeological Research (OAR), the Alabama Archaeological Society (AAS) performed testing on 1Ct161 over two weekends in the summer of 1982. The first weekend focused on a controlled surface survey of four by four meter squares laid out over the site, with material collected, bagged and marked by square with the help of over 40 AAS members. The artifacts were taken to the Alabama Museum of Natural History to be cleaned and curated by the University of Alabama, but they have never been analyzed.

The second weekend of study was led by Lawrence Alexander of the University of Alabama and consisted of a series of backhoe trenches placed on areas containing the greatest density of debitage These trenches were placed on a slight rise in the south center of 1Ct161. Based on these tests, it was revealed that higher elevations had been negatively impacted by farming practices and erosion had completely removed any indication of habitation. In contrast, on the slopes of the site, test pits revealed a 10 cm thick dark soil that appeared to be redeposited from a higher level. The dark soil was situated directly above a second darkened 10 cm soil horizon that had survived apparently undisturbed. Charcoal was encountered with a number of broken tools and debitage in the lower portion of this layer, suggesting an association dating at least to the Early Archaic period.

== Legacy ==
Although Heaven's Half Acre has produced large quantities of fluted points and has been suggested to be a repeatedly occupied Clovis culture habitation complex, the locality has received very little publicity in comparison to sites like the Quad site, Stanfield-Worley Bluff Shelter and Brush Pond in Northern Alabama.

In 2020, a team of professional and avocational archaeologists began a study of the locality that is expected to significantly increase the data available on these sites.
