= Brooks Pate =

Brooks H. Pate is the William R. Kenan Jr. Professor of Chemistry at the University of Virginia.

He graduated from the University of Virginia with a B.S. in chemistry in 1987, and from Princeton University with a Ph.D. in 1992. He was a NRC Postdoctoral Fellow at NIST (Gaithersburg, MD) from 1992 to 1993. He heads the Pate Research Group.

== Awards ==
- 2016 William F. Meggers Award in Spectroscopy
- 2016 Herty Medal
- 2008 Fellow of the American Physical Society
- 2001 MacArthur Fellows Program
- 1999 Coblentz Award
- 1998 Camille Dreyfus Teacher Scholar

== Works ==
- "Distinguishing Tunneling Pathways for Two Chiral Conformer Pairs of 1,3-Propanediol from the Microwave Spectrum". Plusquellic DF, Lovas FJ, Pate BH, Neill JL, Muckle MT, Remijan AJ. J Phys Chem A. October 13, 2009.
- "Semiexperimental Equilibrium Structure for the C-6 Backbone of cis-1,3,5-Hexatriene; Structural Evidence for Greater pi-Electron Delocalization with Increasing Chain Length in Polyenes". Suenram RD, Pate BH, Lesarri A, Neill JL, Shipman S, Holmes RA, Leyden MC, Craig NC. J. Phys. Chem. A. 113, 1864-1868 (2009).
- "Conformational isomerization kinetics of pent-1-en-4-yne with 3,330 cm(-1) of internal energy measured by dynamic rotational spectroscopy". Dian BC, Brown GG, Douglass KO, Rees FS, Johns JE, Nair P, Suenram RD, Pate BH. PNAS. 105, 12696-12700 (2008).
- "Gas-phase conformational distributions for the 2-alkylalcohols 2-pentanol and 2-hexanol from microwave spectroscopy". Tubergen MJ, Conrad AR, Chavez RE, Hwang I, Suenram RD, Pajski JJ, Pate BH. J. Mol. Spec. 251, 330-338 (2008).
- "A broadband Fourier transform microwave spectrometer based on chirped pulse excitation". Brown GG, Dian BC, Douglass KO, Geyer SM, Shipman ST, Pate BH. Review of Scientific Instruments. 79, 053103 (2008)
