= Wayne Township, Dauphin County, Pennsylvania =

Township in Pennsylvania, US

Coordinates: 40°27′00″N 76°49′59″W

- Township
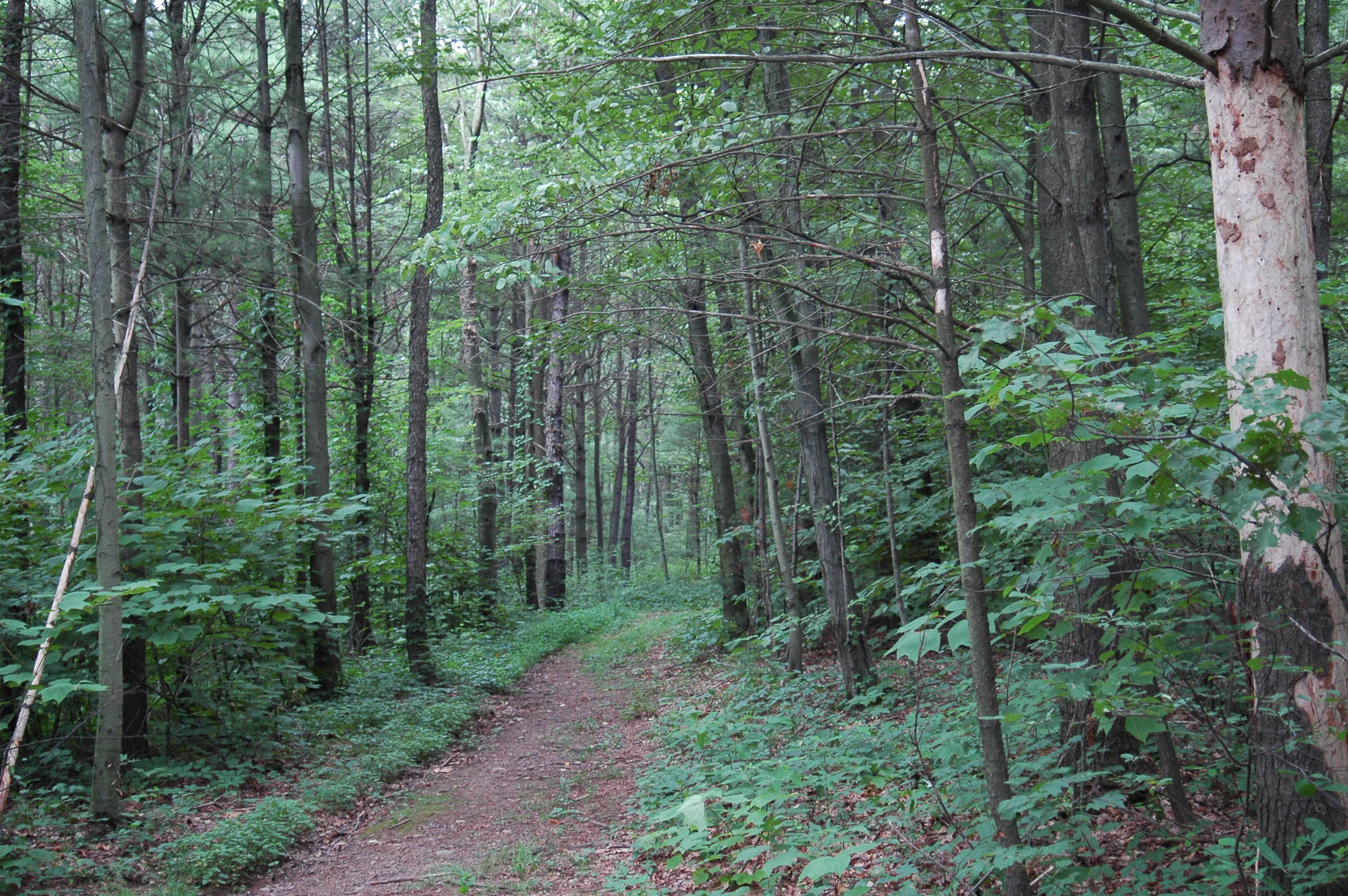
- Joseph E. Ibberson Conservation Area, partly within Wayne Township

- Location in Dauphin County and state of Pennsylvania.
- Country: United States
- State: Pennsylvania
- County: Dauphin
- Incorporated: 1878

Area
  - Total: 13.91 sq mi (36.02 km^{2})
  - Land: 13.91 sq mi (36.02 km^{2})
  - Water: 0 sq mi (0.00 km^{2})

Population (2020)
  - Total: 1,264 ▼
  - Estimate (2023): 1,272
  - Density: 97.6/sq mi (37.67/km^{2})
- Time zone: UTC-5 (Eastern (EST))
  - Summer (DST): UTC-4 (EDT)
- Area code: 717
- FIPS code: 42-043-81744
- Website: Township website

Wayne Township is a township that is located in Dauphin County, Pennsylvania, United States. The population was 1,264 at the time of the 2020 census.

== History ==
Wayne Township was named for Anthony Wayne.

The Shoop Site (36DA20) was listed on the National Register of Historic Places in 1986.

== Geography ==
According to the United States Census Bureau, the township has a total area of 13.9 square miles (36.0 km^{2}), all land.

== Demographics ==
Historical population
Census	Pop.	Note	%±
2010	1,341		—
2020	1,264		−5.7%
2023 (est.)	1,272		0.6%
U.S. Decennial Census

As of the census of 2000, there were 1,184 people, 411 households, and 355 families living in the township.

The population density was 84.9 inhabitants per square mile (32.8/km^{2}). There were 426 housing units at an average density of 30.5 per square mile (11.8/km^{2}).

The racial makeup of the township was 99.16% White, 0.08% Native American, 0.25% Asian, and 0.51% from two or more races. Hispanic or Latino of any race were 0.34% of the population.

There were 411 households, out of which 41.4% had children under the age of eighteen living with them; 78.6% were married couples living together, 4.6% had a female householder with no husband present, and 13.4% were non-families. Out of all of the households that were documented, 10.9% were made up of individuals, and 2.2% had someone living alone who was sixty-five years of age or older.

The average household size was 2.88 and the average family size was 3.08.

Within the township, the population was spread out, with 27.4% of residents who were under the age of 18, 6.4% from 18 to 24, 33.4% from 25 to 44, 24.5% from 45 to 64, and 8.3% who were 65 years of age or older. The median age was 36 years.

For every one hundred females, there were 109.6 males. For every one hundred females who were aged eighteen or older, there were 105.5 males.

The median income for a household in the township was $48,971, and the median income for a family was $50,917. Males had a median income of $39,375 compared with that of $26,731 for females.

The per capita income for the township was $19,279.

Approximately 4.1% of families and 4.8% of the population were living below the poverty line, including 3.0% of those who were under the age of eighteen and 2.2% of those who were aged sixty-five or older.
