= Frank Soday =

American chemist

Frank John Soday (March 10, 1908 – October 16, 1984) was an American chemist best known for his pioneering work on applications of synthetic fiber. Soday was awarded the Herty Medal in 1955 for outstanding contributions to the field of Chemistry. He was also known as an avocational archaeologist, with contributions to studies of Clovis culture in both Pennsylvania and Alabama.

== Life and career ==
Soday spent his childhood in Harrisville, Pennsylvania, and received a bachelor's degree in chemical engineering from Grove City College. He then studied at the Ohio State University, where he received both a Master of Science and a Doctor of Philosophy in chemistry.

Soday was a research and development executive scientist focusing on the uses of synthetic fiber. He filed over 125 patents and published over 150 reports during his career. Soday was instrumental in the development of AstroTurf, developed civilian gas masks for the Office of Emergency Management during World War II, and created the first successful artificial artery. After receiving the Herty Medal in 1955, he was awarded an Honorary Doctor of Science from Grove City College in 1956, and was a delegate to the White House Conference on Business Enterprises in 1957.

== Archaeological work ==
In addition to his career as a chemist, Soday was an instrumental avocational archaeologist best known for his research of two of the largest Paleoindian sites in the United States. As a young man, Soday studied the Shoop Site (36DA20) in Harrisville, Pennsylvania and in 1951, while working for Chemstrand Corporation (now Monsanto), recognized similar Clovis culture technology at the Quad site near Decatur, Alabama. In 1954, Soday facilitated the creation of the Alabama Archaeological Society and served as the first president of this organization. He remained influential in archaeological societies until his death in 1984, when his collection became curated by the Gilcrease Museum in Tulsa, Oklahoma.
