= David L. DeJarnette =

American archaeologist and professor, known as the "Father of Alabama Archaeology"

David Lloyd DeJarnette
- Born: October 18, 1907; Bessemer, Alabama, U.S.
- Died: October 10, 1991 (aged 83); Alabama, U.S.
- Education: University of Alabama; University of Chicago Field School
- Occupations: Archaeologist, Professor
- Years active: 1930–1975
- Employer: University of Alabama
- Known for: "Father of Alabama Archaeology"
- Notable work: TVA Salvage Archaeology; Stanfield-Worley Bluff Shelter excavation La Grange Rock Shelter excavation Handbook of Alabama Archaeology
- Title: Professor of Anthropology and Sociology

David Lloyd DeJarnette (1907–1991) was an American archaeologist and professor with the University of Alabama, generally considered the "Father of Alabama Archaeology".

== Education and early career ==
DeJarnette was born in Bessemer, Alabama in 1907 and studied Electrical Engineering at the University of Alabama, receiving a Bachelor of Science degree in 1929. In 1930, he became curator of the Alabama Museum of Natural History, and in 1932, he received archaeological training from the University of Chicago Field School.

In 1933, the Tennessee Valley Authority announced plans to construct a series of three hydroelectric dams in the Tennessee River which would lead to the flooding of millions of acres of property within the Tennessee Valley. William S. Webb of the University of Kentucky was chosen to direct archaeological salvage operations in Alabama and Tennessee and DeJarnette was hired to lead these efforts in Alabama. This Great Depression era effort employed hundreds of men and women via the Works Progress Administration, a New Deal agency, and resulted in the discovery and excavation of hundreds of archaeological sites now inundated in Wilson Lake, Wheeler Lake and Guntersville Lake.

The resulting studies published by Webb and DeJarnette on the Works Progress Administration salvage operations in Alabama ranged from Archaic Period to Woodland Period to Mississippian Period shell middens, mounds, towns and cemeteries and formed a primary database for a generation of future researchers.

During World War II, DeJarnette served as a coast artillery officer in New Guinea and the Philippines and kept a journal and photographs that were later published by his daughter. After this service, he became the first curator at the American Museum of Science and Energy in Oak Ridge, Tennessee for five years before returning to the University of Alabama in 1953, where he began his career as professor of sociology and anthropology and received his master's degree in 1959.

== University of Alabama career ==
Alabama archaeology soon became DeJarnette's kingdom, and he treated it much in that manner. After participating in the foundation of the Alabama Archaeological Society in 1954, he supported a joint effort between the University of Alabama, the Alabama Archaeological Society and the Archaeological Research Association of Alabama (ARAA) to identify buried Paleoindian remains. This research spanned almost two decades and resulted in numerous surface surveys and excavations, many of which had DeJarnette serving as primary investigator, most notably at Stanfield-Worley Bluff Shelter and La Grange Rock Shelter.

In 1962, Stanfield-Worley Bluff Shelter produced the first Dalton tradition radiocarbon date in Alabama, approximately 7,000 years BC. The shelter produced 11,395 lots of specimens and 157 cubic feet of collection. In 1972, a charcoal sample from La Grange Rock Shelter was dated to 11,280 BC, at the time of discovery one of the oldest dates east of the Mississippi River. Though the radiocarbon data could not be directly associated with a culture, the sample was taken from a stratum located below a Dalton zone and is believed to represent a Paleoindian occupation of the shelter.

DeJarnette was a founding member of the University of Alabama's Department of Anthropology, served as long time editor of the Alabama Archaeological Society's publication, the Journal of Alabama Archaeology, compiled the first summary of Alabama archaeology, and edited the Handbook of Alabama Archaeology. He also served as the Alabama delegate to the Southeastern Archaeological Conference, the Eastern States Archaeological Federation, the Society for American Archaeology and the American Anthropological Association among others. DeJarnette performed numerous studies of the Moundville Archaeological Site, but perhaps his most influential legacy was his annual field schools at the University of Alabama from 1958 to 1975, which produced an army of trained researchers that continued his legacy of successful investigation and reporting of Alabama's prehistory.
