= Herty Medal =

The Local Section of the American Chemical Society has awarded the Herty Medal since 1933 in honor of Charles Herty. The medallion is solid gold and is inscribed with the words "pro scientia et patria - Herty 1933." The Latin phrase translates roughly as "for science and country".

This yearly award recognizes outstanding chemists who have significantly contributed to their chosen fields. All chemists in academic, government, or industrial laboratories who have been residing in the southeastern United States for at least 10 years are eligible. (For this purpose Southeastern United States is defined as the union of the following states: Virginia, West Virginia, Kentucky, Tennessee, Mississippi, Louisiana, Alabama, Georgia, Florida, North Carolina, and South Carolina.)

As of 2025, 91 Herty Medalists have been honored. The 75th Herty Award was commemorated with a special celebration that included a special luncheon at the Coca-Cola Headquarters honoring over 10 Herty Medalists, a Graduate Student Symposium at Georgia Tech with several Medalists as speakers, Future Medalists Symposia at local high schools, and the first Herty Medal Undergraduate Research Symposium (HMURS). Notably, Charles Herty was awarded the second Herty Medal in 1934.

== Recipients ==
Year		Institution
2025	James D. Martin	North Carolina State University
2024	John A. McLean	Vanderbilt University
2023	C. David Sherrill	Georgia Institute of Technology
2022	H. N. Cheng	U.S. Department of Agriculture, New Orleans
2021	Anne-Frances Miller	University of Kentucky
2020	Susan D. Richardson	University of South Carolina
2019	Lisa McElwee-White	University of Florida
2018	Sandra Rosenthal	Vanderbilt University
2017	Rigoberto Hernandez	Georgia Institute of Technology and Johns Hopkins University
2016	Brooks H. Pate	University of Virginia
2015	David Beratan	Duke University
2014	Luigi G. Marzilli	Louisiana State University
2013	David G. Lynn	Emory University
2012	Alvin L. Crumbliss	Duke University
2011	R. Mark Wightman	University of North Carolina at Chapel Hill
2010	Ken B. Wagener	University of Florida
2009	Craig L. Hill	Emory University
2008	Gregory H. Robinson	University of Georgia
2007	Luis Echegoyen	Clemson University
2006	Gary B. Schuster	Georgia Institute of Technology
2005	Dennis C. Liotta	Emory University
2004	Michael T. Crimmins	University of North Carolina, Chapel Hill
2003	Alan G. Marshall	Florida State University
2002	Lanny S. Liebeskind	Emory University
2001	F. Ivy Carroll	Research Triangle Institute
2000	James C. Powers	Georgia Institute of Technology
1999	Richard D. Adams	University of South Carolina
1998	Gordon L. Nelson	Florida Institute of Technology
1997	Fredric M. Menger	Emory University
1996	David W. Boykin	Georgia State University
1995	R. Bruce King	University of Georgia
1994	William D. Ehmann	University of Kentucky
1993	Leon H. Zalkow	Georgia Institute of Technology
1992	Isiah M. Warner	Emory University
1991	Ernest L. Eliel	University of North Carolina, Chapel Hill
1988	Jett C. Arthur, Jr.	Milliken Research Corp. Spartanburgh, SC
1987	Charles K. Bradsher	Duke University
1986	Lockhart E. Rogers	University of Georgia
1985	Raymond B. Seymour	University of Southern Mississippi
1984	Eugene C. Ashby	Georgia Institute of Technology
1983	Albert Padwa	Emory University
1982	Norman L. Allinger	University of Georgia
1981	Jacob H. Goldstein	Emory University
1980	Irwin Fridovich	Duke University
1979	Mary E. Carter	Southern Regional Research Center, USDA, New Orleans
1978	George B. Butler	University of Florida
1977	William L. Marshall	Oak Ridge National Laboratory
1976	Henry C. R. McBay	Morehouse College
1975	Mary L. Good	Louisiana State University
1974	John Montgomery	Southern Research Institute, Birmingham
1973	D. Stanley Tarbell	Vanderbilt University
1972	Kent C. Brannock	Tennessee Eastman Company, Eastman Kodak, Kingsport, TN
1971	S. William Pelletier	U. of Georgia, Athens
1970	Robert E. Lutz	University of Virginia
1969	George L. Drake, Jr.	Southern Regional Research Center, USDA, New Orleans
1968	Charles N. Reilley	University of North Carolina at Chapel Hill
1967	G. H. Cartledge	Chemistry Division, Oak Ridge National Laboratory
1966	James E. Copenhaver (1896–1982)	University of South Carolina
1965	Charles T. Lester	Emory University
1964	S. Y. Tyree, Jr.	University of North Carolina at Chapel Hill
1963	Jack Hine	Georgia Institute of Technology
1962	Charles R. Hauser	Duke University
1961	Howard E. Skipper (1915–2006)	Southern Research Institute, Birmingham, AL
1960	Arthur E. Wood	Mississippi College
1959	C. Harold Fisher	USDA, New Orleans
1958	Lucius A . Bigelow	Duke University
1957	S. J. Floyd	
1956	M. P. Etheridge	Mississippi State
1955	Frank J. Soday	The Chemstrand Corp., Decatur, AL
1954	John R. Sampey	Furman University
1953	Raymond W. McNamee	Carbide & Carbon Chemical Company, WV
1952	Alton E. Bailey	Humko Company, Inc., Tennessee
1951	J. T. MacKenzie	American Cast Iron Pipe Company, Alabama
1950	R. W. Bost	University of North Carolina
1949	Osborne R. Quayle	University of Georgia
1948	W. F. Rudd	Medical School of Virginia
1947	E. Emmett Reid	Johns Hopkins University
1946	W. A. Lazier	Southern Research Institute
1945	P. M. Gross	Duke University
1944	J. E. Mills	Sonoco Products Company
1943	J. H. Yoe	University of Virginia
1942	T. R. Leigh	University of Florida
1941	W. F. Hand	Mississippi State College
1940	J. Sam Guy	Emory University
1939	F. K. Cameron	University of North Carolina
1938	C. E. Coates	Louisiana State University
1937	J. L. Howe	Washington and Lee University
1936	W. H. MacIntire	University of Tennessee
1935	F. P. Dunnington	University of Virginia
1934	Charles H. Herty (1867–1938)	Herty Laboratory
1933	Fred Allison	Alabama Polytechnic Institute, Alabama

== See also ==
- List of chemistry awards
