= SS Charles H. Herty =

World War II Liberty ship of the United States

History

United States
- Name: SS Charles H. Herty
- Namesake: Charles Herty
- Owner: United States Marine Corps
- Ordered: MCE hull 1069
- Builder: Southeastern Shipbuilding Corporation, Savannah, Georgia
- Way number: 4
- Laid down: 21 October 1943
- Launched: 17 November 1943
- In service: after 30 November 1943
- Fate: Sold for scrapping, 1967

General characteristics
- Class & type: Liberty ship; type EC2-S-C1, standard
- Beam: 57 feet (17 m)
- Draft: 27 ft 9.25 in (8.4646 m)
- Propulsion: 1 × triple-expansion steam engine, (manufactured by Vulcan Iron Works, Wilkes-Barre, Pennsylvania); 1 × screw propeller
- Speed: 11.5 knots (21.3 km/h; 13.2 mph)

SS Charles H. Herty was a Liberty ship built in the United States during World War II. It was named after American chemist Charles Herty.
