= Charles Herty =

American chemist, academic, entrepreneur, football coach (1867–1938)

Charles Holmes Herty Sr.
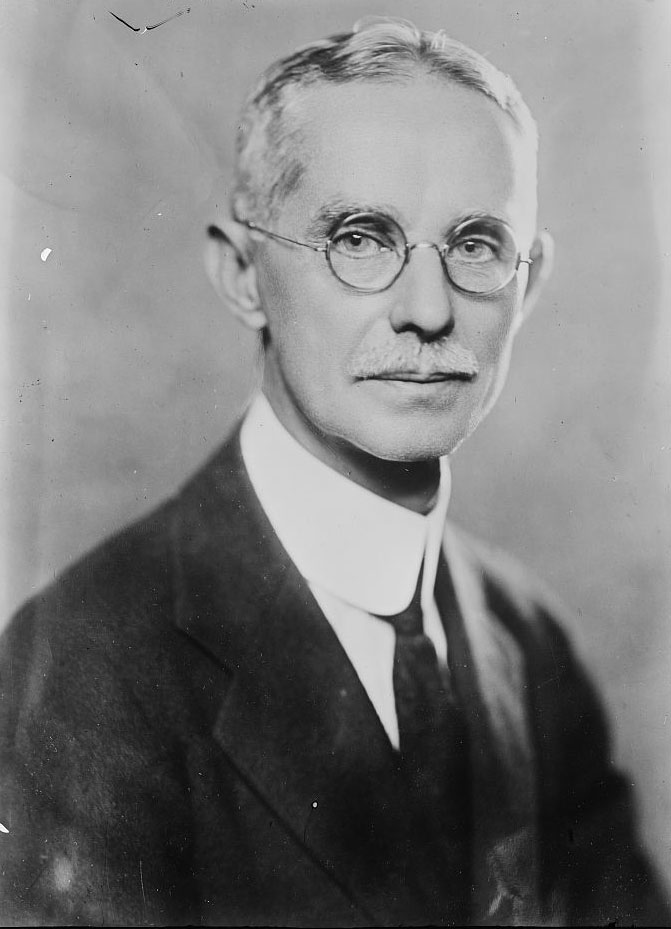
- Born: December 4, 1867; Milledgeville, Georgia, U.S.
- Died: July 27, 1938 (aged 70); Savannah, Georgia, U.S.
- Education: University of Georgia (BPhil); Johns Hopkins University (PhD)
- Known for: Georgia Bulldogs football; Southern United States Turpentine collection system; President, American Chemical Society (1915–1916); National Institutes of Health; Southern United States Pulp and paper industry
- Awards: American Institute of Chemists Gold Medal (1932)
- Scientific career
- Fields: Chemist
- Workplaces: University of Georgia; Johns Hopkins University; University of North Carolina; United States Bureau of Forestry; American Chemical Society; Synthetic Organic Chemical Manufacturers' Association (SOCMA); Chemical Foundation; Savannah Paper and Pulp Laboratory
- Doctoral advisor: Ira Remsen

Charles Holmes Herty Sr. (December 4, 1867 – July 27, 1938) was an American academic, scientist, and entrepreneur. Serving in academia as a chemistry professor to begin his career, Herty concurrently promoted collegiate athletics including creating the first varsity football team at the University of Georgia. His academic research gravitated towards applied chemistry where he revolutionized the turpentine industry in the United States. While serving as the president of the American Chemical Society, Herty became a national advocate for the nascent American chemical industry and left academia to preside over the Synthetic Organic Chemical Manufacturers' Association (SOCMA) and the Chemical Foundation. He was also instrumental in the creation of the National Institutes of Health. Towards the end of his career, Herty's research and advocacy led to the creation of a new pulp industry in the Southern United States that utilized southern pine trees to create newsprint.

== Early life, education and family ==
Born in Milledgeville, Georgia, in 1867, Herty attended the University of Georgia (UGA) in Athens, was a member of the Phi Kappa Literary Society, as well as a member of the Gamma chapter of the Kappa Alpha Order, and graduated with a Bachelor of Philosophy (B.P.) degree in 1886. He continued his studies at Johns Hopkins University where he earned his Ph.D. in inorganic chemistry in 1890 under the direction of Ira Remsen. Herty's dissertation topic was The Double Halides of Lead and the Alkali-Metals.

Herty married Sophie Schaller of Athens (granddaughter of Sophie Sosnowski) on December 23, 1895, and they had three children: Charles "Holmes", Jr., Frank Bernard and Sophia "Dolly" Dorothea. Holmes became a metallurgist and vice-president of Bethlehem Steel and was elected to both the United States National Academy of Sciences and the American Philosophical Society. Frank worked for the Union Gas Company in Brooklyn, New York. Dolly attended Vassar College as an undergraduate, Cornell University for her Masters of Science in botany and returned to Vassar to teach plant physiology.

== Early academic and professional life ==
Upon completing his doctoral studies in 1890, Herty returned to Georgia as an assistant chemist at the Georgia Agricultural Experiment Station, which was temporarily located in Athens at the time. In 1891, he became an instructor in the UGA Chemistry Department in Franklin College with a promotion to Adjunct Professor of Chemistry in 1894.

Herty was granted a sabbatical leave for the 1899–1900 academic year. After securing letters of introduction from American colleagues William McMurtrie, Remsen, Edgar Fahs Smith, and Francis Venable, Herty left for Europe and interacted with Walther Nernst, G. Lunge, Otto N. Witt and Alfred Werner. Herty's European trip provided the stimulus to experiment with Georgia pine trees as a source of paper after learning of the German use of tannenbäume for that same purpose.

A Witt lecture on the poor processes used by the American naval stores industry and the almost certain likelihood that those processes would completely destroy the longleaf pine (Pinus palustris) led Herty to study the naval store industry's use of those trees to produce timber and turpentine. After engaging in literature and field research to better understand the industry and its processes, Herty confirmed the validity of Witt's claim that the pine species would be completely destroyed. Herty also elucidated massive inefficiencies in the destructive collection processes. After conferring with forester W. W. Ashe of the North Carolina Geological Survey, Herty simplified a cup and gutter system used for many decades in France to combat both problems. The "Herty system" required less forestry expertise and labor, both necessities to ensure the method's financial success in the United States.

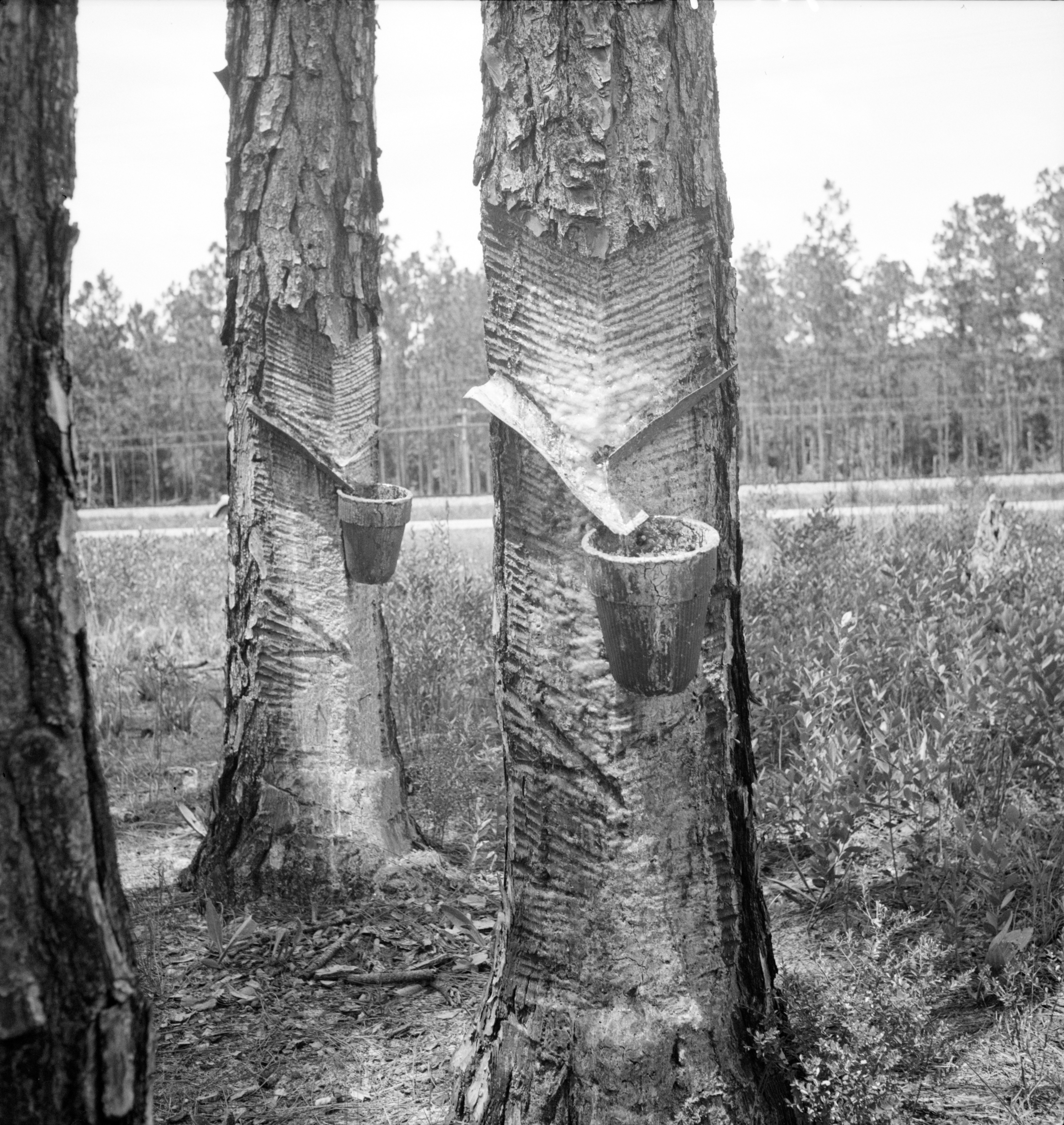
"Herty system" in use on turpentine trees in Northern Florida, U.S., circa 1936

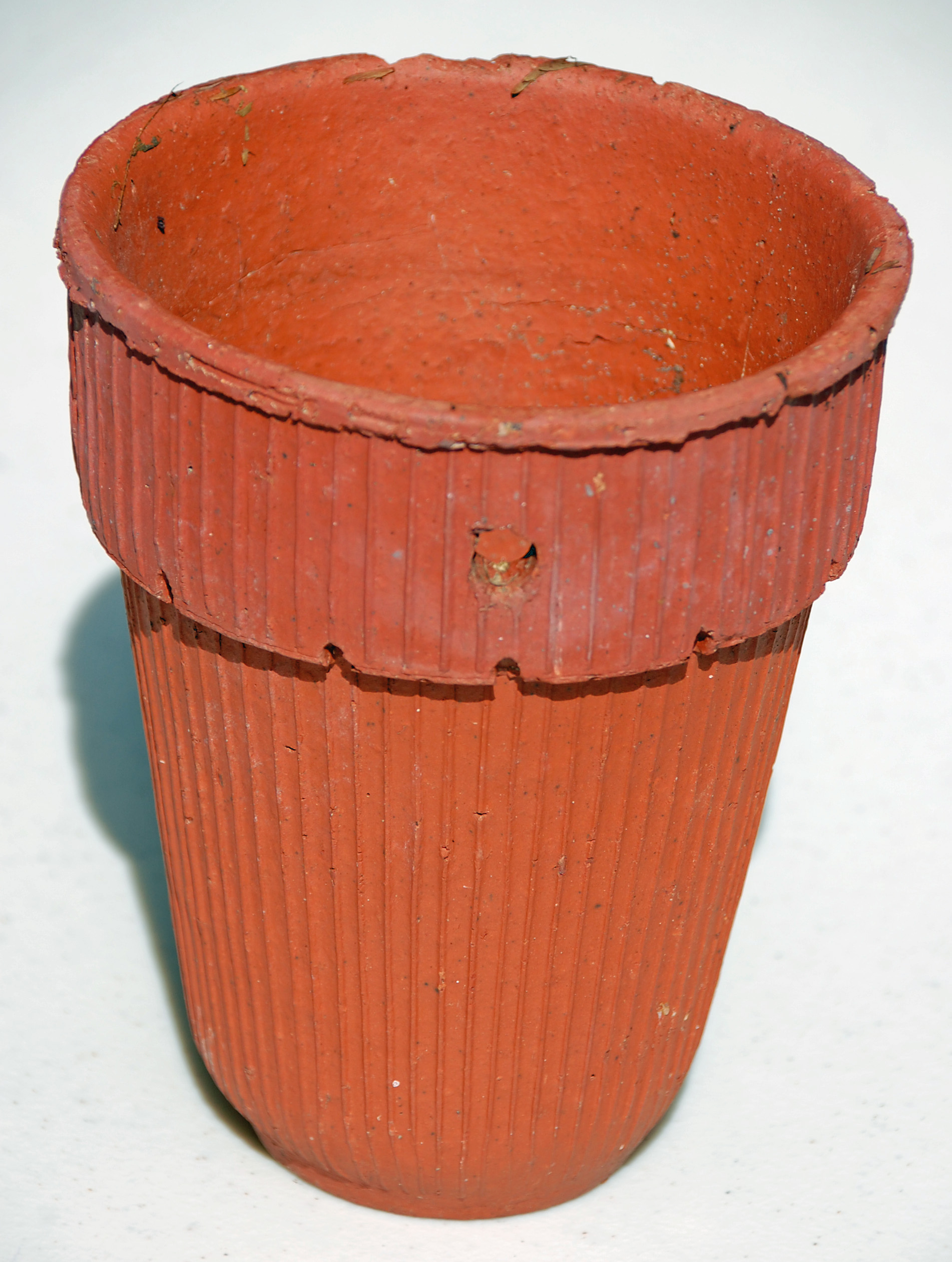
Herty turpentine cup, made of clay. The hole is for nailing to a pine tree.

The initial Herty system utilized two v-shaped galvanized iron gutters to collect the resin. The simplicity of the method allowed it to be taught to the existing workforce in the turpentine industry. Herty's method yielded more resin that was also higher in quality. The most important aspect of this new method was that it lengthened the useful lifetime of the trees from a few years to decades. This extended use saved the trees and the naval store industry as well. Herty's collection method also allowed the trees to eventually be milled as lumber. Herty subsequently moved from an iron gutter to a ceramic one, and his involvement with the Chattanooga Pottery Company in the production of the ceramic gutters eventually led to the creation of the Herty Turpentine Cup Company in 1909.

In November 1901, Herty resigned from UGA due to a dispute with the chair of the department. On January 1, 1902, he joined the United States Bureau of Forestry.

After continued recruitment efforts by Venable, the president of the University of North Carolina at Chapel Hill (UNC) at the time, Herty finally accepted a long-offered appointment as the head of that school's chemistry department in January 1905 and served as the Smith Professor of Applied Chemistry, officially beginning his duties in July of that year. In 1908, Herty was appointed the dean of UNC's School of Applied Sciences and served in that position until 1911. During his tenure at UNC, Herty continued to receive numerous job offers from groups including UGA as the Chair of Forestry, the United States Department of Agriculture Bureau of Soils, the Forest Products Laboratory, the University of Virginia, and the Massachusetts Institute of Technology; however, Herty remained at UNC.

While on the UNC faculty, Herty was an active member of the American Chemical Society (ACS) and the American Association for the Advancement of Science (AAAS) and served as the president of the North Carolina section of the ACS in 1906, chairman of the Division of Physical and Inorganic Chemistry in 1909, councillor-at-large in 1909 and eventually as president of the entire ACS organization from 1915 through 1916. In that same year he joined the American Forestry Association. Herty was also active in Orange County society and business. He was a member of the county commission and president of the local school board from 1910 until 1916. As part-owner of several local businesses including the Chapel Hill Telephone Company and the Chapel Hill Bank, Herty became a well-known member of the community.

== Later professional life ==
After serving two terms as the ACS president (1915 and 1916), Herty resigned his UNC position after being unanimously elected as the first full-time editor of the ACS publication Journal of Industrial and Engineering Chemistry (JIEC) with an annual salary of US$6,000. Herty moved to New York City to begin his editorial duties. In addition to those duties, Herty also served as the chairman of the ACS Press and Publicity Committee beginning in 1918 which he leveraged to turn the Committee into the ACS News Service on December 9, 1918. The News Service began publishing the Chemical & Engineering News in 1924. Herty remained editor of the IJEC through the latter half of 1921.

On October 28, 1921, a group of synthetic organic chemical manufacturers created the Synthetic Organic Chemical Manufacturers' Association (SOCMA). As part of that meeting, they also convinced Herty to become president of this new organization and his focus now shifted to the federal government in Washington, D.C. Herty also focused on improving the relationship between academia and the organic chemical industry.

In November 1926, Herty resigned from SOCMA to become an adviser to the Chemical Foundation where he would work alongside his long-time friend and collaborator, Francis P. Garvan, the president of the Foundation from 1919 to 1937.

The Chemical Foundation was created in 1919 to oversee German patents seized by the United States Office of Alien Property during World War I to aid the growth of the nascent American chemical industry. Garvan and Alexander Mitchell Palmer were the Alien Property Custodians for President Woodrow Wilson and were tasked with the creation of the foundation.

Another function of the foundation was the promotion of the field of chemistry and its contributions to society. This goal required the identification and funding of chemical research in academia, industry and government. It also required seeking out donors to fund research deemed important. An example of Herty's efforts occurred in 1928, when Herty worked on behalf of his alma mater, UGA, to fund a research professorship and laboratory equipment for Professor Alfred Scott to study the turpentine-derivative resene.

In 1926, Herty began a professional relationship with U.S. Senator Joseph Ransdell based on their mutual interest in public health issues and protectionism. Herty was instrumental in assisting the Senator in the four-year struggle to gain the 1930 passage of the Ransdell Act which created the National Institute of Health from the existing Hygienic Laboratory within the United States Public Health Service.

In 1927, Herty relinquished his full-time responsibilities at the Foundation to become a chemical consultant to universities, trade associations, municipal governments and private firms in the southern U.S. He continued to work on several Foundation initiatives including the Ransdell bill for an annual retainer of US$5,000 through 1930.

Herty formed the Savannah Paper and Pulp Laboratory in Savannah, Georgia. By 1933, the plant had developed a feasible process for pulp conversion. On March 31, 1933, the first newspaper—the Soperton News—was printed using paper created with the Herty process. On September 26, 2001, the Savannah lab was named a National Historic Chemical Landmark (NHCL).

== Athletics ==
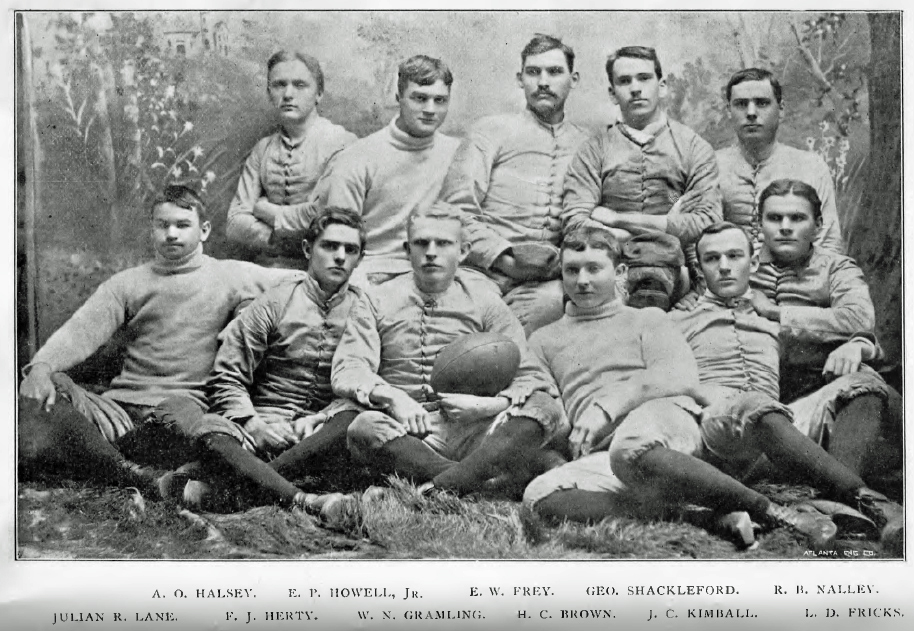
Herty formed and coached the first varsity football squad at the University of Georgia in 1892.

Herty was the first faculty director of athletics at UGA. He also assumed the position of Instructor in Physical Culture in 1894 and was named Physical Director two years later. He led efforts to improve the athletic fields, establish the first campus gymnasium in the basement of Old College, create intramural and varsity baseball teams, and built tennis courts. In 1890, Herty began the UGA football program and coached the team for its inaugural season.

UGA played their first game on January 30, 1892, against Mercer University in Athens and won, 50–0. The team lost its second game of the season to Auburn, 10–0, and finished the inaugural season with a record of 1–1. Frank "Si" Herty, the coach's cousin, served as the captain of the team. That first football field would eventually be named Herty Field in honor of the coach. The area became a parking lot in the 1940s; however, it was later converted into a greenspace in 1999.

Herty was also directly involved in the creation of the Southern Intercollegiate Athletic Association (SIAA), which held its first meeting in Atlanta on December 22, 1894.

=== Head coaching record ===
==== Football ====
Year	Team	Overall	Conference	Standing	Bowl/playoffs
Georgia Bulldogs (Independent) (1892)
1892	Georgia	1–1			
Georgia:		1–1			
Total:		1–1			

== Death and legacy ==
Herty died on July 27, 1938, in Savannah, Georgia, from complications due to a series of heart attacks in the months preceding his death. Services were held at St. John's Episcopal Church in Savannah. Herty's body was cremated in Macon, and his remains were interred in a private ceremony at Memory Hill Cemetery in Milledgeville.

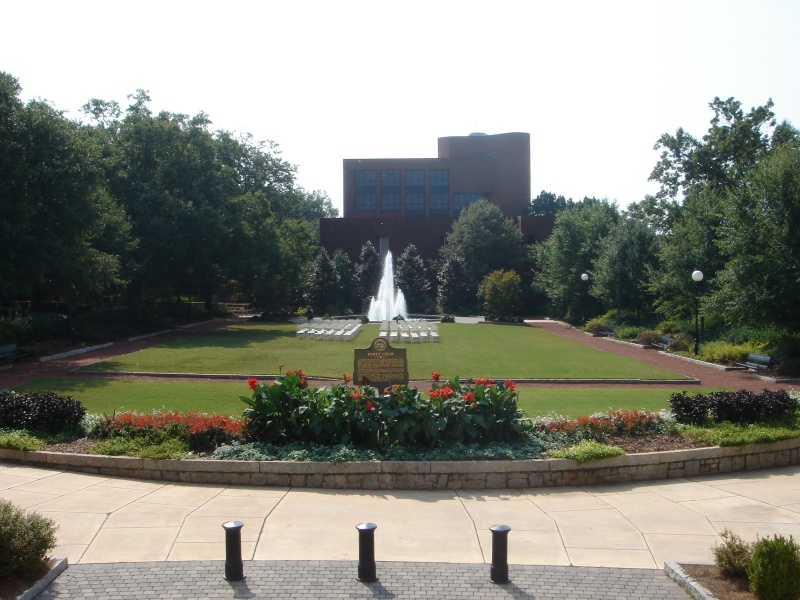
Herty Field, UGA's first football field, circa 2005

On June 13, 1938, the Southland Paper Mills, Inc. was organized, the next year the mill site was dedicated to Herty on May 27, 1939, and the first commercial newsprint made of Southern pine started production at this facility on January 17, 1940. The St. Regis Paper Company purchased controlling interest in Southland and eventually purchased it outright in 1977, and in 1984 Champion International bought St. Regis to become the largest manufacturer of "white paper" and the second largest domestic producer of newsprint. In 2000, Herty was posthumously inducted into the Paper Industry International Hall of Fame. A year later, on September 26, 2001, his work was designated a National Historic Chemical Landmark by the American Chemical Society and a plaque was installed at the Savannah Pulp and Paper Laboratory (Herty Advanced Materials Development Center) in Savannah, Georgia.

Herty, Texas and Herty Elementary School in that same area are named in his honor. Numerous college buildings are named after Herty. The most significant is a two-story structure at Georgia Southern University campus, used for science courses, including geology, geography, and chemistry. Also at Georgia Southern University is the Herty Pine Forest, a tract of old-growth Southern Yellow pines used for turpentine research. There is also the science building at Georgia College & State University and the science and agriculture building at Savannah State University. Other namesakes include a UGA scholarship fund provided by the Alumni Association, the Herty Forest Institute in Waycross, Georgia, the liberty ship SS Charles H. Herty (launched in 1943), and Herty Drive and Herty Field on the northwest campus of UGA. A plaque with his portrait was also hung by order of the Georgia General Assembly at the Georgia State Capitol in 1946. The Charles H. Herty Medal has been awarded annually since 1933 by the Georgia Section of the American Chemical Society. The medal is inscribed with the words pro scientia et patria - Herty 1933 which translates roughly as "for science and country".

The Georgia General Assembly posthumously created the Savannah-based Herty Foundation in 1938 as a state-owned, non-profit organization focused on the pulp and paper industry. This foundation was renamed in 2006 as the Herty Advanced Materials Development Center. The center was part of Georgia Southern University before it was torn down in 2024.
