= Herty, Texas =

- Unincorporated community
- Location within Texas Location within the United States
- Coordinates: 31°21′23″N 94°41′00″W
- Country: United States
- State: Texas
- County: Angelina
- Elevation: 312 ft (95 m)
- Time zone: UTC-6 (Central (CST))
  - Summer (DST): UTC-5 (CDT)
- Area code: 936
- GNIS feature ID: 1359085

Herty is an unincorporated community in north central Angelina County, Texas, United States. According to the Handbook of Texas, the community had a population of 605 from 1970 through 2000. It is located within the Lufkin, Texas micropolitan area.

== History ==
The establishment of the Southland Paper Mills adjacent to the Angelina and Neches River Railroad in 1940 led to the creation of Herty. The area is named after Dr. Charles Herty, a Georgia chemist who developed the first process to create paper from southern pine. He was also a co-founder of Southland Paper. Most of the community's residents worked at the paper mill.

The population of Herty was 1,400 in 1960 and 605 from 1970 through 2000.

== Geography ==
Herty is located three miles east of Lufkin at the intersection of State Highway 103 and Farm to Market Road 842.

== Education ==
Herty is a part of the Lufkin Independent School District. Herty Primary School is located in the community.
