= Herty Advanced Materials Development Center =

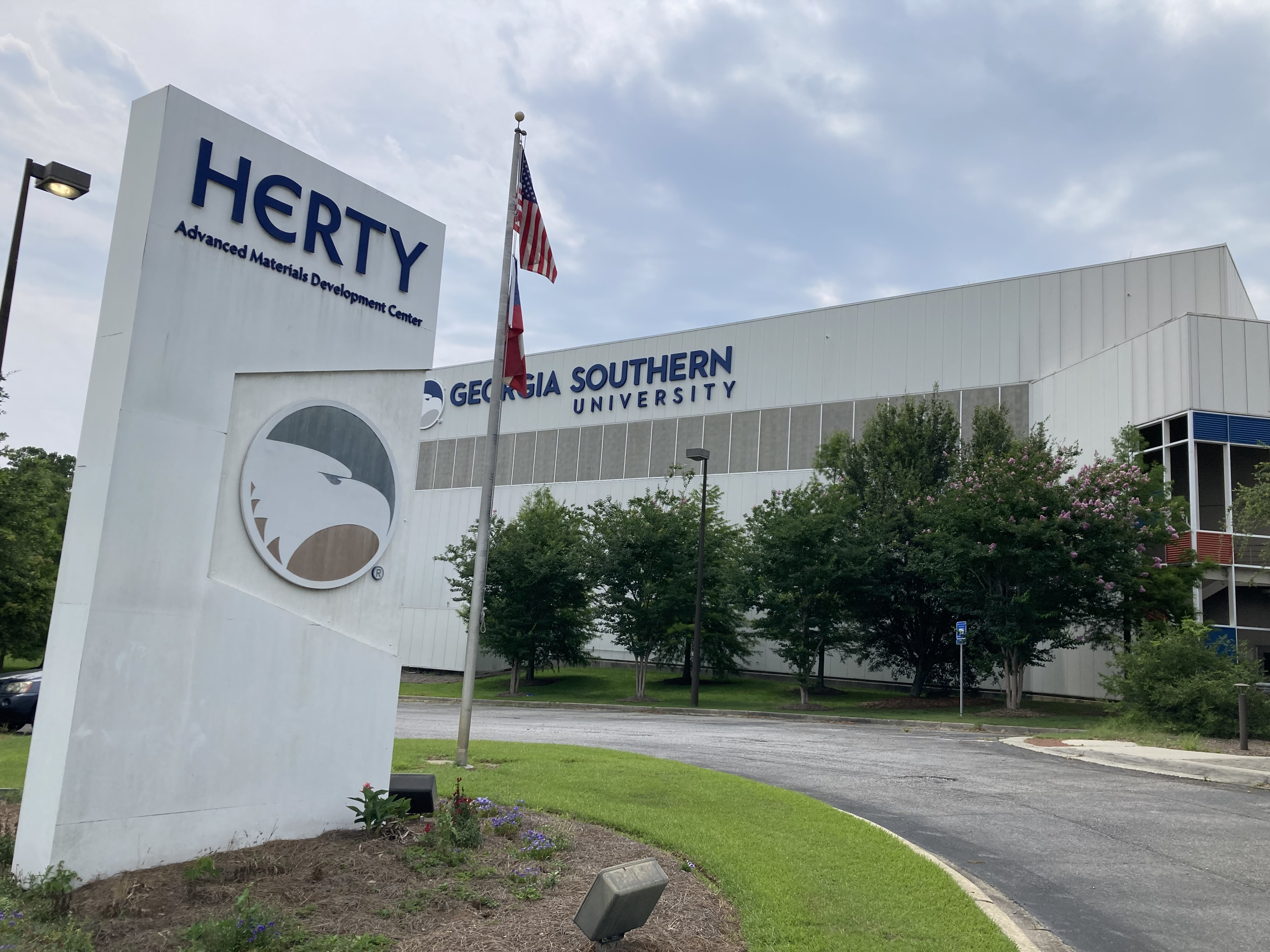
- HAMDC pictured in May 2024
- Interactive map of the Herty Advanced Materials Development Center area

General information
- Location: 110 Brampton Road; Savannah, Georgia 31408
- Coordinates: 32.11122°N 81.14301°W
- Opened: 1938
- Demolished: 2024

Technical details
- Floor area: 120,000 square feet (11,000 m^{2})

The Herty Advanced Materials Development Center (HAMDC or Herty AMDC) was a research center most recently managed by Georgia Southern University. Herty was established in 1938 by the state of Georgia as an applied research center to honor Charles H. Herty, a chemist whose discoveries spearheaded the utilization of southern softwoods in the manufacture of pulp and paper products. In 2012, Georgia governor Nathan Deal transferred management of Herty to Georgia Southern to enhance economic and business development in the State of Georgia. Herty AMDC was demolished in late 2024.

== Early history ==
The Herty Advanced Materials Development Center owes its origins to the Savannah Pulp and Paper Laboratory, a non-profit research and development center founded in 1932. Establishing the Savannah Pulp and Paper Laboratory was the idea of Herty, who advocated the creation of a "semi-commercial-scale" laboratory to demonstrate the utilization of southern pine in the production of newsprint and other fiber-based products derived from southern pine. Initial funding for the laboratory came from the Chemical Foundation, the State of Georgia, the City of Savannah, the Savannah Electric and Power Company, and local businesses. The Laboratory was located at 512 West River Street and is one of the earliest examples of a public-private partnership in the United States.

The founding of the Savannah River Pulp and Paper Laboratory by Herty in 1932 was a defining moment in the history of the North American paper industry. Herty's inventions related to the pulping of southern pine were implemented and commercialized in the 1940s and 1950s. Specifically, the demonstration of newsprint production at the laboratory provided the justification for the first commercial newsprint mill located in Lufkin, Texas in 1940. Subsequent utilization of the Southern forests spurred economic development in the region, helping the United States become one of world's leading producers of pulp and paper products.

Following the death of Herty in 1938, the Savannah Pulp and Paper Laboratory was renamed the Herty Foundation to commemorate the considerable contributions of its founder.

The primary mission of the Herty Foundation was the support the pulp and paper industry. Paper companies, chemical companies and equipment suppliers used the Herty pilot facilities to evaluate products and process equipment. Notable projects included pulping, bleaching and papermaking with bamboo and silage sycamore for the US Department of Agriculture; refiner plate evaluations for Sprout Waldron, white-water chemistry studies for the Dow Chemical Company; pilot scale pulping for various pulp mills; chlorine dioxide bleaching studies for various paper companies, and the production of specialty papers for governmental agencies.

"Located on a 10-acre campus in Savannah, the Herty Advanced Materials Development Center is a new product and process accelerator, providing technical, market and manufacturing expertise within a 120,000 square foot facility."

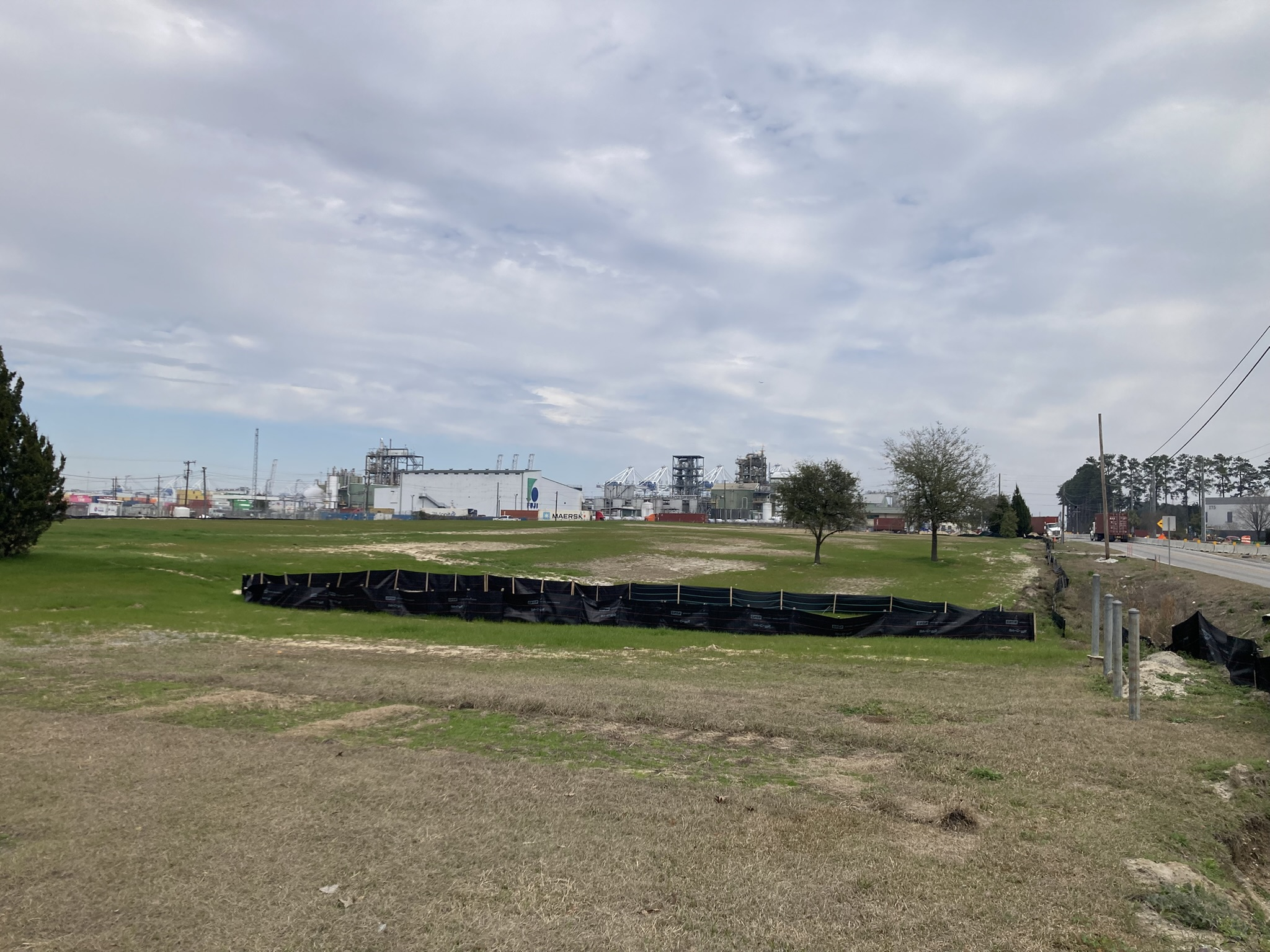
The land where Herty AMDC used to be, pictured in February 2025

In late 2024, the Herty Foundation was torn down and the land repurposed for additional port container storage.
