= Lucius A. Bigelow =

American chemist

Lucius Aurelius Bigelow
- Born: January 31, 1892; Boston, Massachusetts
- Died: December 11, 1973 (aged 81)
- Education: MIT, Harvard, Yale
- Scientific career
- Fields: Chemistry
- Workplaces: Brown University, Duke University

Lucius Aurelius Bigelow (1892–1973) was an American chemist, specializing in the fluorination of organic compounds.

== Early life ==
Bigelow was born in Boston, Massachusetts on January 31, 1892 to Lucius Aurelius and Mary Elizabeth Bigelow. He graduated from Boston English High.

== Education ==
After completing his undergraduate studies from the Massachusetts Institute of Technology in 1915, Bigelow briefly attended Harvard (1916-1917) before moving to Yale University where he finished his Ph.D. in organic chemistry in 1919. After a short teaching stint at St. Lawrence University, Bigelow moved to a professorship at Brown University, where he taught for nine years. Finally, Bigelow moved to Duke University in 1929 where he served as a member of the chemistry department faculty until his retirement in 1961.

== Research ==
Bigelow's primary academic research was fluorine chemistry and the direct fluorination of diverse organic compounds. In particular, his work provided the foundations for the preparation of fluorocarbons during World War II as part of the Manhattan Project.

After retiring from teaching at Duke, Bigelow continued his research work at Hynes Chemical Research Corporation, a Durham, North Carolina facility founded by several of his former graduate students.

== Awards ==
In 1958, Bigelow was the recipient of the Herty Medal by the Georgia Section of the American Chemical Society, recognizing him as an outstanding Southern chemist.

== Death ==
Lucius A. Bigelow died in 1973, survived by his wife Mary Cummings Bigelow and two children.
