= N. Howell Furman =

American chemist (1892–1965)

Nathaniel Howell Furman (22 Jun 1892 – 2 Aug 1965) was an American professor of analytical chemistry who helped develop the electrochemical uranium separation process as a member of the Manhattan Project.

== Background and career ==
Furman was born in the Lawrenceville section of Lawrence Township, Mercer County, New Jersey in 1892. He attended Lawrenceville School, where he was a model student, graduating with a Master's Prize from his high school in 1909. He enrolled in Princeton University, where he received Phi Beta Kappa honors and graduated in 1913. He received an M.S. in 1915 and a Ph.D. from Princeton in 1917. Furman served in World War I in the Army Chemical Warfare Service. He returned to Princeton in 1919 to become an assistant professor, gaining promotion and tenure in 1937, and finished his career in 1960 as the Russell Wellman Moore Professor of Chemistry.

=== Manhattan Project ===
Furman helped develop an ether extraction process to extract Uranium oxide, a precursor to the fissile material used in the first atom bombs as discussed in the Smyth report. He served as a special consultant to the U.S. Atomic Energy Commission and was an advisor to the post-War Office of Scientific Research and Development. An August 8, 1945, special to the Princeton Bulletin revealed that multiple Princeton faculty, among them Albert Einstein, John Archibald Wheeler, Henry DeWolf Smyth, Hugh Stott Taylor, and Furman, had all "disappeared to Shangri-La" to work secretly on the bomb during wartime.

=== Books published ===
In 1933 Furman co-wrote Elementary Quantitative Analysis, one of the first textbooks in the field of analytical chemistry for undergraduates.

He co-wrote Analytical Chemistry of the Manhattan Project in 1950.

== Personal life ==
A resident of Princeton, New Jersey, Furman owned a summer cottage in Charlotte, Vermont, on Lake Champlain and enjoyed sailboat racing and golf in his spare time. He had a son and a daughter—who became a chemist—with Hannah S. Hendrickson.

== Honors ==
- 1953 - Palladium Medalist, Electrochemical Society
- 1951 - President of the American Chemical Society
- 1949 - Class of 1913 Distinguished Service Award
- 1948 - First recipient of the Fisher Award for analytical chemistry
- 1916-1917 - Charlotte Elizabeth Procter Fellowship
