= Luis Echegoyen =

Chemistry professor

Luis A. Echegoyen (born January 17, 1951) is a chemistry professor at the University of Texas at El Paso, and 2020 President of the American Chemical Society (ACS).

== Early life and education ==
Echegoyen was born in Havana, Cuba, in 1951, and moved with his family to Puerto Rico at age nine. He received his B.S. (1971) and Ph.D. (1974) in chemistry from the University of Puerto Rico, Río Piedras Campus, followed by a postdoctoral appointment at the University of Wisconsin–Madison.

He subsequently worked at Union Carbide before returning to the University of Puerto Rico as a faculty member in 1977. He joined the National Science Foundation in 1982 as director of the chemical dynamics program in its Chemistry Division, then moved to the University of Miami in 1983, where he was promoted to full professor in 1987. He served as a professor of chemistry at Clemson University from 2002, chairing its chemistry department until 2006, and has been with UTEP since 2010. Echegoyen also served as director (2006–2010) of the National Science Foundation's Chemistry Division.

In November 2018, Echegoyen was elected President-Elect of the ACS by its membership, and served as ACS president in 2020.

=== Research interests ===
Echegoyen's research focuses on new materials, complexes of Fullerenes, recognition complexes, and self-assembly.

=== Community service ===
Echegoyen has served on several prestigious committees, including the Alan T. Waterman Award committee and as an Affiliate Member of the International Union of Pure and Applied Chemistry. He has served in leadership roles in the Electrochemical Society.

== Awards and honors ==
- 1996 – Florida Section Award, ACS.
- 1997 – University of Miami Provost's Scholarly Activity Award.
- 2003 – Fellow of the American Association for the Advancement of Science.
- 2004 – College of Engineering & Science Award for Faculty Achievement in the Sciences, Clemson University.
- 2007 – Herty Medal, ACS Georgia Section.
- 2009 – Fellow, IUPAC.
- 2010 – Robert A. Welch Chair, UTEP.
- 2011 – ACS Fellow.
- 2011 – ACS Award for Recognizing Underrepresented Minorities in Chemistry for Excellence in Research & Development.
