= Quad Site =

The Quad Site is a series of Paleoindian sites and localities in Limestone County near Decatur, Alabama. It was first reported by Frank Soday in 1954, and later findings were also documented by James Cambron, David Hulse and Joe Wright and Cambron and Hulse. The Quad Locale can seldom be viewed at current lake levels, even during normal winter pool, due to extensive erosion, but is considered one of the most important and well known Paleoindian sites in the Southeastern United States.

Together, the Quad Site, Stone Pipe and Pine Tree sites form what is now considered the Quad locality, a congregation of sites interspersed along the floodplain of the Tennessee River for a distance of approximately 1 mile. These sites were located on ancient levees of the Tennessee River and were exposed due to wave action in the early 1950s. The sites were extensively surface collected by a small, dedicated group of avocational archaeologists through the 1970s, at which point the Archaeological Resources Protection Act became law.

Artifacts collected from these sites included a variety of fluted points from the Clovis Culture, Middle to Late Paleoindian forms including Quad and Beaver Lake and Transitional types such as Dalton and Big Sandy (side-notched). A toolkit composed of knives, end scrapers, side scrapers, gravers and choppers were also illustrated in articles. Archaic and Woodland components were mentioned, but few potsherds or triangular points. In all, David Hulse and Joe Wright inventoried 40,466 artifacts gathered from the Quad Locality from just six collections acquired over a 40-year period.

The Quad Locality is important because of its artifact density, size and age. Sites producing more than 10 fluted points are very uncommon. For a cluster of such sites to occur in such a small area is rare. Over 180 fluted points have been inventoried from the complex, putting it among the ten most dense fluted point localities in North America. Because of its significance, the approximately 50 acre expanse within the floodplain across from the City of Decatur which encompasses Stone Pipe, Pine Tree, and Quad Site has been reported in a number of amateur and a few professional research papers. This research included excavations, interpretive studies of artifacts and site placements by professional archaeologists, and comparative studies of artifacts from Quad and other local sites.

== Excavations ==
The excavations performed on the Quad Site occurred at a time when they were culturally acceptable and legal. Federal laws now prohibit archaeological work without permit on Federal property.

Cambron and Hulse embarked on five excavations on the Quad site as the water levels allowed, reporting only on the findings from the westernmost test at the Circle of Rocks, completed in early 1960. This area was chosen because of the number of fluted points discovered in surface collections made by Frank Soday, and later inventories indicate that 21 fluted projectiles were discovered by the group within the boundaries of this scatter.

During the Circle of Rocks excavation, twenty-one 5-foot square sections were taken down in arbitrary 3-inch levels to determine the stratigraphy of the site and the depth of the culture bearing deposit. Four distinct strata were encountered in the study, the first being a shallow layer of silt, the second a sterile vein of grayish clay. These tests produced a combined total of only 8 artifacts.

Stratum III was the first significant culture bearing layer and was encountered at a depth of 6 inches. Stratum IV was yellow clay that was considered sterile below 3 inches, based on findings of Cumberland and Clovis points weathering out of the bottom of Stratum III or the top of Stratum IV during a surface collection of the vicinity. While the midden was quite mixed, one fluted midsection was recovered from Stratum IV, as well as Dalton points, numerous scrapers, and one side notched projectile – a Big Sandy.

Concentrations of Big Sandy points caused the researchers to suggest that the Quad Site was perhaps a staging area for the Big Sandy (side-notched) culture in Alabama. Advancing this idea were the inventories by Hulse and Wright, which counted a total of 3,102 Big Sandys from the complex, 527 of which were discovered at the Circle of Rocks, and an additional 172 from the Stone Pipe Site. Hulse went on to suggest a greater antiquity of this type in the Tennessee Valley than believed, based on increases in the number of triangular and rectangular uniface end scrapers, thought to relate to Dalton or earlier types, in Big Sandy assemblages. In addition, all but 13 of the Big Sandys inventoried from the Quad Complex exhibited basal grinding, a trait suggesting some contemporaneity to "older" groups.

The second excavation, which took place on the first levee away from the current river channel, became known as the Power Line excavation, consisted of a series of eight 5 foot squares again taken down to the yellow clay. Eleven Big Sandy points were recovered just above this presumably sterile layer, along with the base of a Greenbrier Dalton. Later excavations on various other parts of the locale provided similar findings.

== Studies ==
Soday's Quads Site collection was among a sample of tools from various large Northeast and Carolina Paleoindian sites studied by Edwin Wilmsen. Wilmsen made a series of measurements on groups of artifacts from these areas, including edge angle, length, width and thickness, and found the Quad assemblage made up of long, heavy and steep edged tools when compared to those from other Paleoindian sites. Wilmsen suggested that these characteristics indicated a culture made up of small bands making numerous trips to the site, perhaps on a seasonal basis. Wilmsen also proposed that the tool kit indicated Paleoindian subsistence at the site was geared toward foraging of plants and small animals, rather than the presumed hunting of Pleistocene megafauna such as bison and mastodon.

John Walthall proposed that the Quad locality had been a series of oxbow lakes and swamps prior to the completion of Wheeler Dam. These lakes had been proven favored hunting ranges for early man in Alabama because of their attraction to animals. He also suggested that the use of the location may have been enhanced by a popular prehistoric river ford, which he noted was one of the reasons for the founding of the city of Decatur in this particular spot in 1821. Notes from the individuals who collected the site indicate that the oxbow lakes were of more recent vintage; and that the series of backwater loci suggest the location of the Tennessee River channel during the Pleistocene.

Cambron and Hulse commented on 14 unfinished fluted points and seven channel flakes from various sites, including the Quad site, in an attempt to determine the preferred lithic materials and discuss manufacturing techniques. Through experimentation they noted that points with a median ridge were easier to flute, thus suggesting that longer flutes on the ridged Cumberland points possibly represented a "refinement" of the Clovis fluting method. Variants of Ft. Payne chert make up the majority of material types from their sample, but two pieces produced from Bangor flint were included, as well as one of Dover flint.

The final report by Cambron and Hulse, discussed finds from the 1961 season, a year that was marked by the rupture of Wheeler Dam and basin water levels falling to record lows. Hulse reported the discovery of two Clovis points from the Last Site near Stone Pipe, while Cambron shared a Cumberland from the Pine Tree Site.

== Legacy ==
The Quad Site is one of three Paleoindian complexes in Alabama, along with Coffee Slough and Heaven's Half Acre that are known to have produced over 100 fluted points, putting them among the top ten most dense fluted point sites in North America.

Public interest surrounding the discovery and reporting of the Quad Site led to a number of important changes in the way archaeology was performed in Alabama during the 1960s and 1970s. Members of the Alabama Archaeological Society formed the Archaeological Research Association of Alabama (ARAA) in 1960, intending to identify and excavate an intact site with a fluted point component. The ARAA generated financial support for archaeological work via public donation, and coupled with free labor provided by the Alabama Archaeological Society, providing professional archaeologists the ability to contribute to numerous excavations and surveys at very low cost. The ARAA (now defunct) soon became a program of national renown, a decade long partnership between avocational and professional archaeologists that remains unmatched to this day.

The partnership between the AAS and ARAA resulted in numerous excavations and surface surveys over the next two decades, the most salient being the Stanfield-Worley Bluff Shelter led by David L. DeJarnette, which produced the first Late Paleoindian (Dalton) radiocarbon date in Alabama. The AAS remains an active archaeological partner in Alabama to this day.
