= Dalton tradition =

Projectile point tradition

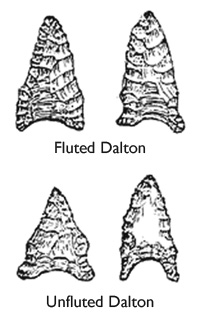
Examples of fluted and unfluted Dalton points

The Dalton tradition is a Late Paleo-Indian and Early Archaic projectile point tradition. It is named after S. P. Dalton, a judge who first discovered these artifacts in Missouri. These points appeared in most of southeast North America from c. 10,700 BCE to at least c. 8,400 BCE.

According to archaeologist Brian Fagan, Dalton points possess "concave bases with 'ears' that sometimes flare outward" and were used as saws and knives as well as weapons. They often changed form and function because the hunters would sharpen the points over and over, repurposing them into knives, then chisels or scrapers. A variant on the Dalton point is the Hardaway point of North Carolina.

== See also ==
- Clovis culture – Prehistoric culture in the Americas c. 11,100–10,800 BCE
- Folsom tradition – North American Paleo-Indian archaeological culture
