= Stanfield-Worley Bluff Shelter =

- Overview of Stanfield-Worley Bluff Shelter illustrating trench and block excavation

Alabama Register of Landmarks and Heritage
- Official name: Stanfield-Worley Bluff Shelter (1Ct125)
- Designated: June 18, 2015

The Stanfield-Worley Bluff Shelter, located on private property in Colbert County in northwestern Alabama, United States, is one of the most important prehistoric sites excavated in the state due to the archeological evidence deposited by the Paleo-Indians who once occupied the rock shelter. Lying in Sanderson Cove along a tributary of Cane Creek approximately seven miles (11 km) south of the Tennessee Valley, the shelter and the high bluffs of the surrounding valley provided a well-protected environment for the Native American occupants.

According to The Earliest Americans Theme Study for the Eastern United States, Stanfield-Worley Rock Shelter is considered a strong candidate for National Historic Landmark status.

== History ==
Based on archeological evidence, the Stanfield-Worley Bluff Shelter was occupied from the Paleoindian Period to the Mississippian period. The well-preserved stratigraphic zones provide insights into the evolution of prehistoric societies in northern Alabama over a period of nine millennia.

=== Dalton zone ===
Stratigraphic zones exposed during excavation at Stanfield-Worley Bluff Shelter

Dalton zone projectile points collected at Stanfield-Worley Bluff Shelter

The Dalton zone, shown as Zone D in the photograph of the stratigraphic zones, represents a transitional Paleo-Indian culture of Alabama with specimens dated to approximately 7000 BCE based on radiocarbon dating. The artifacts found in this complex are typical of mobile hunter-gatherers. The Dalton occupation was remarkable in its intensity with over 150 projectile points, in addition to Paleo-Indian uniface tools such as scrapers and knives, found during the 1961 survey season. The projectile points include both Paleo-Indian (lanceolate Dalton points) and Archaic (side-notched Big Sandy points) specimens. Other artifacts indicate manufacture of wood, antler, and bone tools.

Paleoindian sites with preserved faunal and floral records, such as Stanfield-Worley Bluff Shelter, are important to understanding cultural development during the period. The faunal remains of the site contain bones of modern animals including deer, squirrel, turkey, and porcupine. The shelter is located below the southern extent of the current range of porcupines. In addition, remains of the extinct passenger pigeon have been found. Although the animals which the Dalton occupants hunted are similar to those hunted by Archaic peoples, there is no evidence in the zone of shellfish collection or seed processing, traits of established Archaic societies.

=== Middle Archaic through Mississippian periods ===
Zone B in the photograph of the stratigraphic zones contains specimens from the Morrow Mountain Phase of the Middle Archaic period. The excavation of this intermediate layer yielded three sets of human remains as well as projectile points, bone awls, and other tools. The youngest stratigraphic zone (Zone A, not shown in the photograph) contained specimens from the Archaic through Mississippian periods.

== Archeology ==
=== Archeological surveys ===
Big Sandy projectile points collected at Stanfield-Worley Bluff Shelter

The excavation of the Stanfield-Worley Bluff Shelter commenced in 1960, after gaining approval of the property owner, Robert B. Stanfield. The project was under the guidance of the North Alabama Project, a partnership between the Alabama Archaeological Society, the University of Alabama and the Archaeological Research Association of Alabama. The first two field seasons (1960 and 1961) were reported by David L. DeJarnette and colleagues. The excavation of the third and final season (1963) was smaller in scale with the results never being published.

The trench and block technique was utilized in the excavation of the site. In this technique, individual blocks are created by digging trenches in a defined pattern. The exposed sides of the resulting blocks allow excavation to proceed by individual zones or strata. The trenches and blocks are pictured in the photograph on the upper right. The resulting collection includes over 11,000 specimens.

=== Archeological significance ===
By 1960, it was clear that north Alabama had possibly the densest concentration of Paleo-Indian sites within the United States, as evidenced by the discovery of the Quad Site near Decatur, Alabama. The importance of the Stanfield-Worley Bluff Shelter, one such Paleo-Indian site, lies in its ability to establish an accurate timeframe for Dalton projectile points. This resulted in references to the site in almost every summary of eastern North American prehistory.

With over 150 projectile points recovered in the 1960 season alone, the site provided invaluable information on numerous early cultures in Alabama. The projectile points were divided into "fifty-six taxonomic types and six residual categories or provisional types." Much of the information was incorporated into the Handbook of Alabama Archaeology.

Both Robert E. Bell and Charles H. Fairbanks lauded the success of the North Alabama project in raising funds to further archaeological research.
