= Innlandet Hospital Trust =

Norwegian hospital group

Coordinates: 60°52′58″N 10°56′57″E

Innlandet Hospital is a health trust which covers Innlandet county in Norway. The health trust consists of 10 divisions with services over 41 sites throughout the county. The hospital is headquartered in the town of Brumunddal in Ringsaker Municipality, just north of Hamar. It is owned by Southern and Eastern Norway Regional Health Authority.

== Hospital structure ==
Innlandet Hospital consists of six somatic hospitals, which first and foremost deal with physical ailments, and two psychiatric hospitals which deal with various mental disorders.

Across these hospitals, the decentralised services of both mental and somatic illnesses can be found.

=== Divisions ===
- Hospital divisions
  - Elverum-Hamar
  - Gjøvik
  - Lillehammer
  - Kongsvinger
  - Tynset
- Subject divisions
  - Acute medicine and pre-hospital Services Division
  - Habilitation and Rehabilitation Division
  - Medical Services Division
  - Psychiatric Health Services Division
- Non-medical Divisions
  - Ownership and Intern Service Division

== Hospitals ==
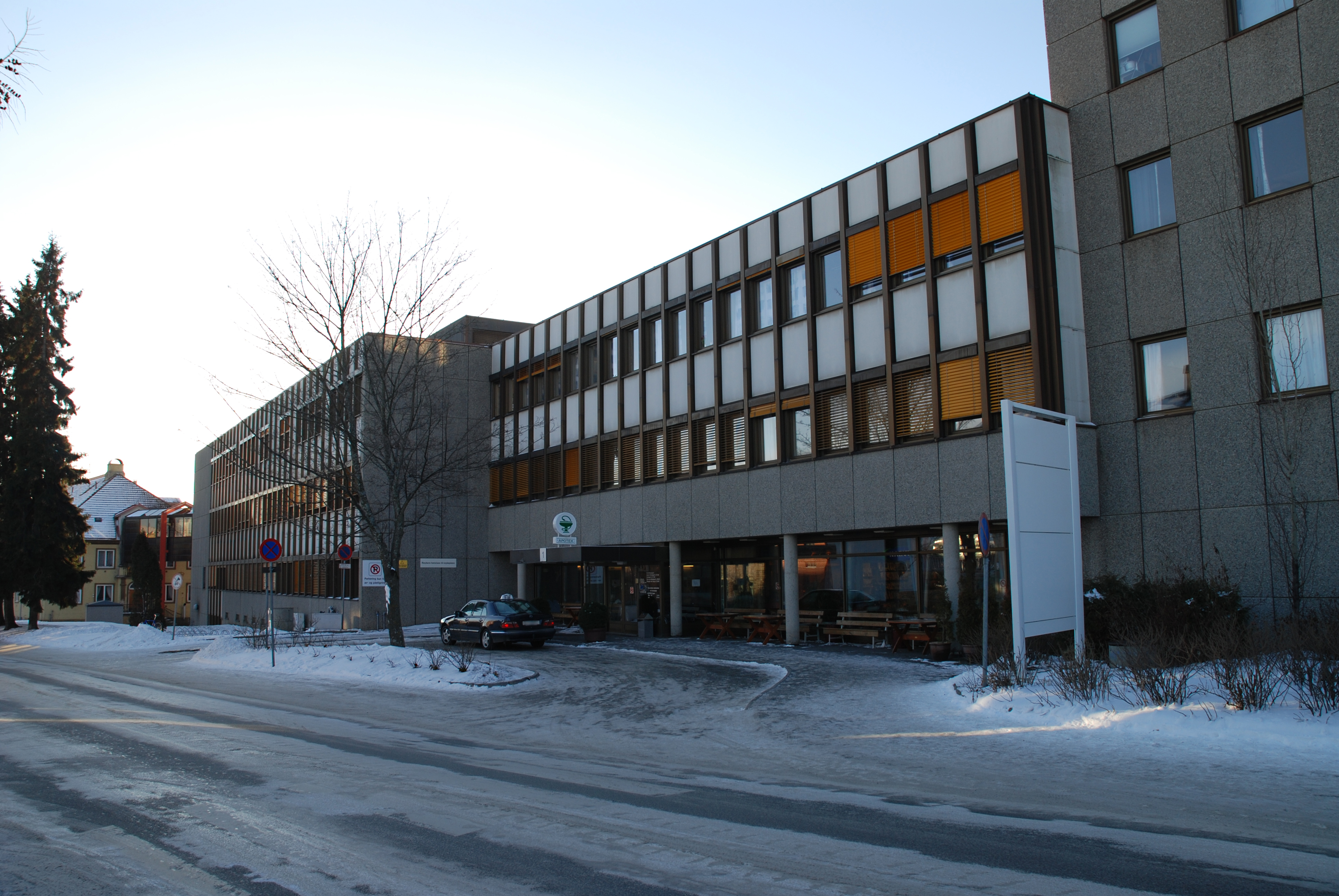
Headquarters of Innlandet Hospital Hamar.

- Somatic hospitals
  - Elverum Hospital
  - Gjøvik Hospital
  - Granheim Lung Hospital
  - Hamar Hospital
  - Kongsvinger Hospital
  - Lillehammer Hospital
  - Tynset Hospital
- Psychiatric hospitals
  - Reinsvoll Hospital
  - Sanderud Hospital

== Staff Health ==
The staff of the vice-administrative director is known as Staff Health. In this staff, are IT services, electronic patient journals, research departments and knowledge centres. In Avdeling for kunnskapsstøtte there are also library services, and courses for practical knowledge, knowledge courses, structured learning plans, and clinical pathways.
