= Geriatric anesthesia =

Branch of medicine that studies anesthesia approach in the elderly

Geriatric anesthesia (or geriatric anaesthesia) is the branch of medicine that studies anesthesia approach in elderly.

== Origin ==
The perioperative care of elderly patients differs from that of younger patients for a number of reasons. Some of these can be attributed to the changes that occur in the process of aging, but many are also caused by diseases that accompany seniority. The distinction between so-called normal aging and pathological changes is critical to the care of elderly people. Anesthesia and surgery has become more common as the population survives longer. Perioperative management of the geriatric patients requires knowledges about changes associated with aging physiology and its relation to surgery and anesthesia. Only experienced anesthetists can evaluate patients effectively and plan for their perioperative care to minimize complications. Comprehensive preoperative evaluation of an elderly individual's health status can be a very challenging aspect, especially for the young anesthetist. Sir William Osler's aphorism "Listen to the patient, he'll give you the diagnosis" is as true in the elderly patient as it is in the young. But in the elderly several factors makes taking history more difficult and time-consuming.

Many differences can be seen in geriatric anesthesia. First, the preoperative evaluation of the geriatric patient is typically more complex than that of the younger patient because of the heterogeneity of this patient group and the greater number and complexity of comorbid conditions that usually accumulate with age. Perioperative functional status can be difficult to predict because many elderly patients have reduced preoperative function as a consequence of deconditioning, age-related disease, or cognitive impairment. This makes it difficult to adequately assess the patient's ability to respond to the specific stresses associated with surgery. A common example is trying to determine cardiopulmonary reserve in a patient very limited by osteoarthritis. Physiologic heterogeneity and decreased functional reserve are also manifested perioperatively. Normal aging results in changes in cardiac, respiratory, and renal physiology, and the response of the elderly patient to surgical stress is often unpredictable. The pharmacokinetics and pharmacodynamics of elderly and younger patients also differ; moreover, the elderly patient's use of multiple medications may alter homeostatic mechanisms.

== Training and education programs ==
A Syllabus on Geriatric Anesthesiology is available from the American Society of Anesthesiologists.

Online resources are also available as the Geriatric Anesthesiology Curriculum.

Graduate medical education in the United States is regulated by the Accreditation Council for Graduate Medical Education (ACGME) and the American Osteopathic Association Bureau of Osteopathic Specialists (AOABOS). Each program must provide “appropriate didactic instruction and sufficient clinical experience in managing problems of the geriatric population.” The published joint ASA/American Board of Anesthesiology content outline for in-training examinations also includes a section on “Geriatric Anesthesia/Aging: The Pharmacological Implications, MAC Changes and the Physiological Implications on Major Organ Systems.” These mandates make geriatric education a requirement for any program in anesthesiology. This is not the rule in all graduate medical education programs. A recent survey by the Association of Directors of Geriatric Academic Programs reviewed ACGME policies required by 100 nonpediatric programs. They found that only 27 of these programs had specific requirements for geriatric training; anesthesiology and pain management were two of these.

== Organization and societies ==
The Society for the Advancement of Geriatric Anesthesia (SAGA) is dedicated to improving the care of the older patient coming to surgery. It offers educational programs at its annual meeting as well as at meetings of other anesthesia societies. It also offer educational support for anesthesia training programs. The Age Anaesthesia Society is the UK equivalent of SAGA.
