= Anesthesia =

State of medically-controlled temporary loss of sensation or awareness

Anesthesia Anaesthesia
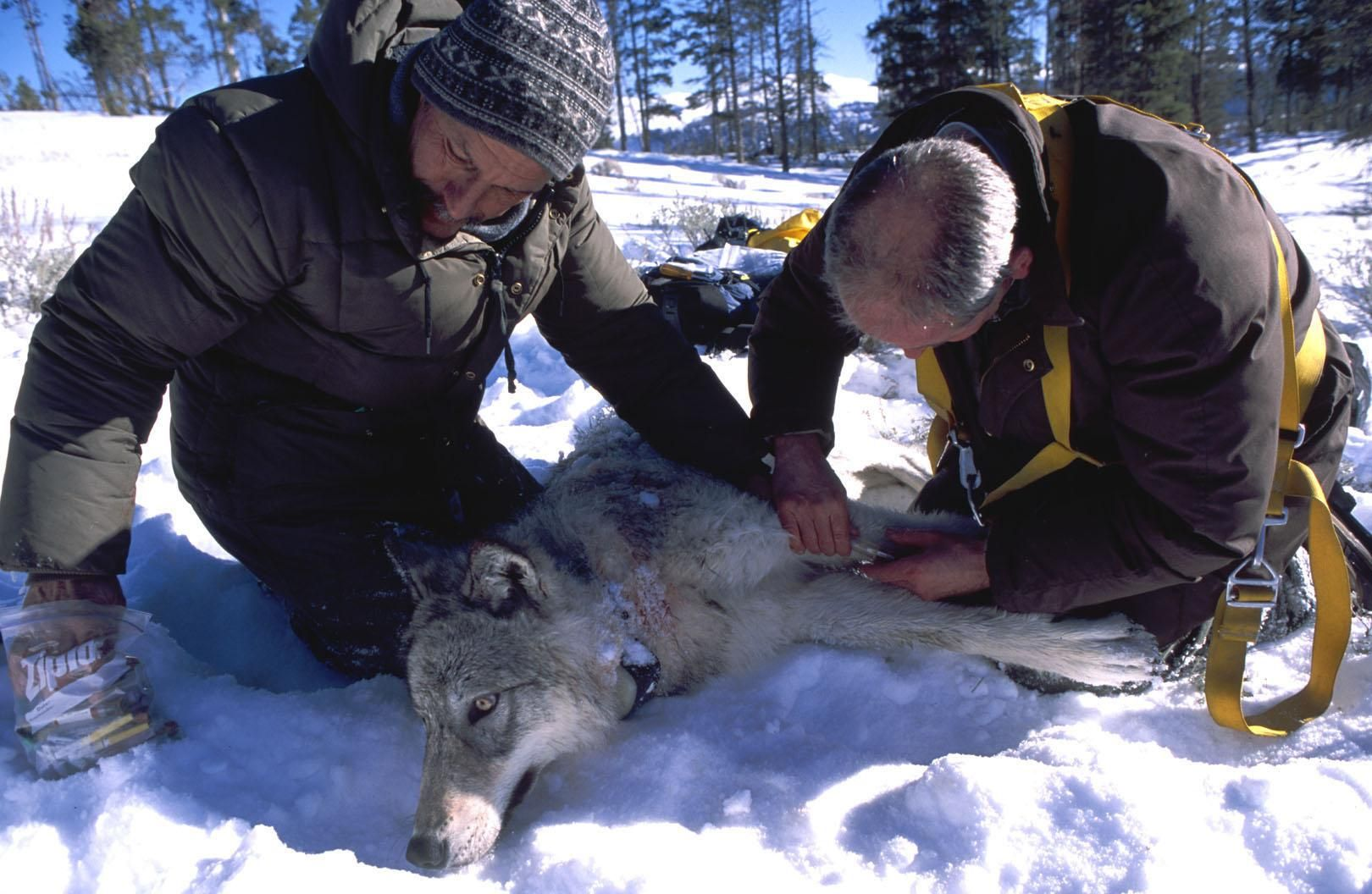
- A wolf that has been anesthetized so it can be fitted with a radio-collar and have a blood sample taken
- Pronunciation: /ˌænɪsˈθiːziə, -siə, -ʒə/
- MeSH: E03.155
- MedlinePlus: anesthesia
- eMedicine: 1271543

Anesthesia (American English) or anaesthesia (British English) is a state of controlled, temporary loss of sensation or awareness that is induced for medical, veterinary, or criminal purposes. It may include some or all of analgesia (relief from or prevention of pain), paralysis (muscle relaxation), amnesia (loss of memory), and unconsciousness. An individual under the effects of anesthetic drugs is referred to as being anesthetized or sedated (these terms are avoided in legal writing involving criminal or domestic cases). A body part under the effects of local anesthetic drugs is referred to as being numbed.

An anesthesiologist administers these drugs to minimize movement, destructive behavior, and the threat of injury to both the patient and the doctor. Three broad categories of anesthesia exist:

- General anesthesia suppresses central nervous system activity and results in unconsciousness and total lack of sensation, using either injected or inhaled drugs.
- Sedation suppresses the central nervous system to a lesser degree, inhibiting both anxiety and creation of long-term memories without resulting in unconsciousness.
- Regional and local anesthesia block transmission of nerve impulses from a specific part of the body. Depending on the situation, this may be used either on its own (in which case the individual remains fully conscious), or in combination with general anesthesia or sedation.
  - Local anesthesia is simple infiltration by the clinician directly onto the region of interest (e.g. numbing a tooth for dental work).
  - Peripheral nerve blocks use drugs targeted at peripheral nerves to anesthetize an isolated part of the body, such as an entire limb.
  - Neuraxial blockade, mainly epidural and spinal anesthesia, can be performed in the region of the central nervous system itself, suppressing all incoming sensation from nerves supplying the area of the block.

In preparing for a medical or veterinary procedure, the clinician chooses one or more drugs to achieve the types and degree of anesthesia characteristics appropriate for the type of procedure and the particular patient. The types of drugs used include general anesthetics, local anesthetics, hypnotics, dissociatives, sedatives, adjuncts, neuromuscular-blocking drugs, narcotics, and analgesics.

The risks of complications during or after anesthesia are often difficult to separate from those of the procedure for which anesthesia is being given, but in the main they are related to three factors: the health of the individual, and the anesthetic technique. Of these factors, the individual's health has the greatest impact. Major perioperative risks can include death, heart attack, and pulmonary embolism whereas minor risks can include postoperative nausea and vomiting and hospital readmission. Some conditions, like local anesthetic toxicity, airway trauma or malignant hyperthermia, can be more directly attributed to specific anesthetic drugs and techniques.

== Medical uses ==
The purpose of anesthesia can be distilled down to three basic goals or endpoints:

- hypnosis (a temporary loss of consciousness and with it a loss of memory. In a pharmacological context, the word hypnosis usually has this technical meaning, in contrast to its more familiar lay or psychological meaning of an altered state of consciousness not necessarily caused by drugs—see hypnosis).
- analgesia (lack of sensation which also blunts autonomic reflexes)
- muscle relaxation

Different types of anesthesia affect the endpoints differently. Regional anesthesia, for instance, affects analgesia; benzodiazepine-type sedatives (used for sedation, or "twilight anesthesia") favor amnesia; and general anesthetics can affect all of the endpoints. The goal of anesthesia is to achieve the endpoints required for the given surgical procedure with the least risk to the subject.

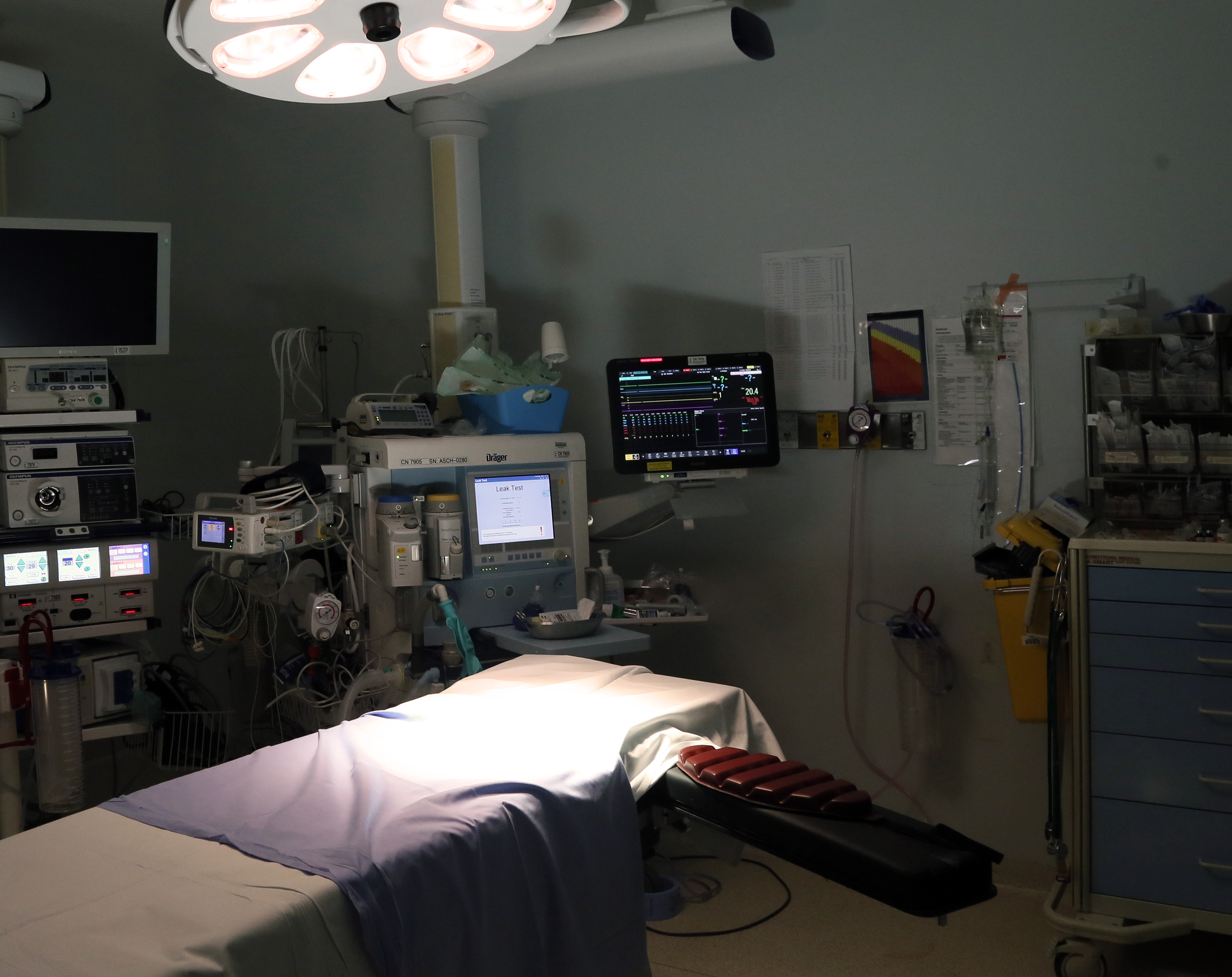
The anesthetic area of an operating room

To achieve the goals of anesthesia, drugs act on different but interconnected parts of the nervous system. Hypnosis, for instance, is generated through actions on the nuclei in the brain and is similar to the activation of sleep. The effect is to make people less aware and less reactive to noxious stimuli.

Loss of memory (amnesia) is created by action of drugs on multiple (but specific) regions of the brain. Memories are created as either declarative or non-declarative memories in several stages (short-term, long-term, long-lasting) the strength of which is determined by the strength of connections between neurons termed synaptic plasticity. Each anesthetic produces amnesia through unique effects on memory formation at variable doses. Inhalational anesthetics will reliably produce amnesia through general suppression of the nuclei at doses below those required for loss of consciousness. Drugs like midazolam produce amnesia through different pathways by blocking the formation of long-term memories.

Nevertheless, a person can dream under anesthesia or are conscious of the procedure despite giving no indication of this during it. An estimated 22% of people do dream under general anesthesia, and one or two cases in a thousand have some consciousness, termed "anesthesia awareness". It is not known whether animals dream while under general anesthesia.

== Techniques ==
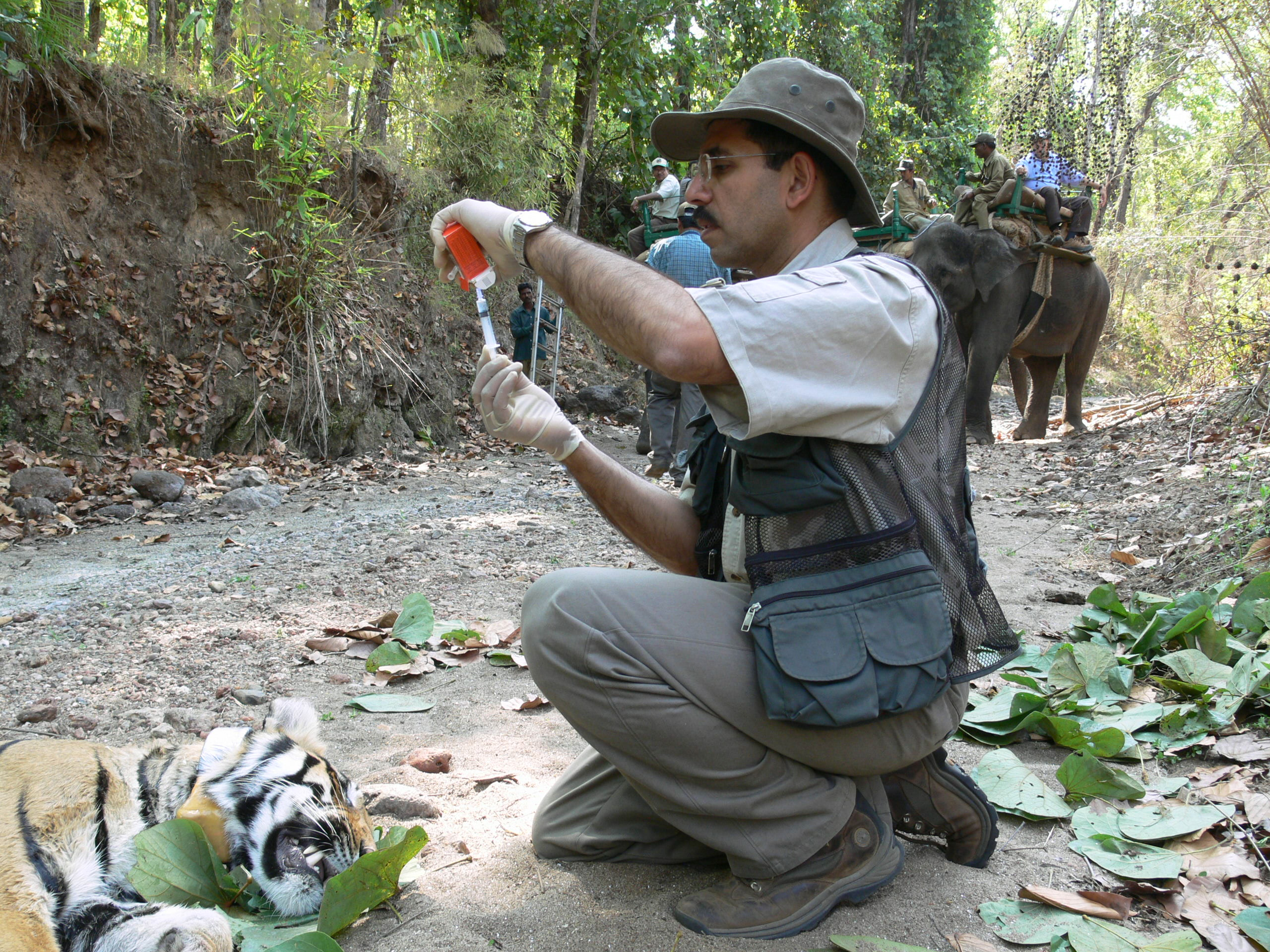
A wildlife conservationist preparing a reversal drug to wake up an anesthetized tiger

Anesthesia is not a direct treatment in its own right, but rather it facilitates other treatments, diagnoses, or cures which would otherwise be painful or complicated. The best anesthetic, therefore, is the one with the lowest risk to the patient while still achieving the endpoints required to complete the procedure. The first stage in anesthesia is pre-operative risk assessment consisting of the medical history, physical examination and lab tests. Diagnosing the patient's pre-operative physical status allows the clinician to minimize anesthetic risks. A well-completed medical history will arrive at the correct diagnosis 56% of the time, which increases to 73% with a physical examination. Lab tests help in diagnosis but only in 3% of cases, underscoring the need for a full history and physical examination prior to anesthetics. Incorrect pre-operative assessments or preparations are the root cause of 11% of all adverse anesthetic events.

Safe anesthesia care depends greatly on well-functioning teams of highly trained healthcare workers. The medical specialty centered around anesthesia is called anesthesiology, and doctors specialized in the field are termed anesthesiologists. Additional healthcare professionals involved in anesthesia provision have varying titles and roles depending on the jurisdiction, and include anesthetic nurses, nurse anesthetists, anesthesiologist assistants, anesthetic technicians, physician assistants in anesthesia, operating department practitioners and anesthesia technologists. International standards for the safe practice of anesthesia, jointly endorsed by the World Health Organization and the World Federation of Societies of Anaesthesiologists, highly recommend that anesthesia should be provided, overseen or led by anesthesiologists, with the exception of minimal sedation or superficial procedures performed under local anesthesia.

A trained, vigilant anesthesia provider should continually care for the patient; where the provider is not an anesthesiologist, they should be locally directed and supervised by an anesthesiologist, and in countries or settings where this is not feasible, care should be led by the most qualified local individual within a regional or national anesthesiologist-led framework. The same minimum standards for patient safety apply regardless of the provider, including continuous clinical and biometric monitoring of tissue oxygenation, perfusion and blood pressure; confirmation of correct placement of airway management devices by auscultation and carbon dioxide detection; use of the WHO Surgical Safety Checklist; and safe onward transfer of the patient's care following the procedure.

ASA physical status classification system
ASA class	Physical status
ASA 1	Healthy person
ASA 2	Mild systemic disease
ASA 3	Severe systemic disease
ASA 4	Severe systemic disease that is a constant threat to life
ASA 5	A moribund person who is not expected to survive without the operation
ASA 6	A declared brain-dead person whose organs are being removed for donor purposes
E	Suffix added for patients undergoing emergency procedure

One part of the risk assessment is based on the patient's health. The American Society of Anesthesiologists has developed a six-tier scale that stratifies the patient's pre-operative physical state. It is called the ASA physical status classification. The scale assesses risk as the patient's general health relates to an anesthetic.

The more detailed pre-operative medical history aims to discover genetic disorders (such as malignant hyperthermia or pseudocholinesterase deficiency), habits (tobacco, drug and alcohol use), physical attributes (such as obesity or a difficult airway) and any coexisting diseases (especially cardiac and respiratory diseases) that might impact the anesthetic. The preanesthetic physical examination helps quantify the impact of anything found in the medical history in addition to lab tests.

Aside from the generalities of the patient's health assessment, an evaluation of specific factors as they relate to the surgery also need to be considered for anesthesia. For instance, anesthesia during childbirth must consider not only the mother but the baby. Cancers and tumors that occupy the lungs or throat create special challenges to general anesthesia. After determining the health of the patient undergoing anesthesia and the endpoints that are required to complete the procedure, the type of anesthetic can be selected. Choice of surgical method and anesthetic technique aims to reduce risk of complications, shorten time needed for recovery and minimize the surgical stress response.

=== General anesthesia ===
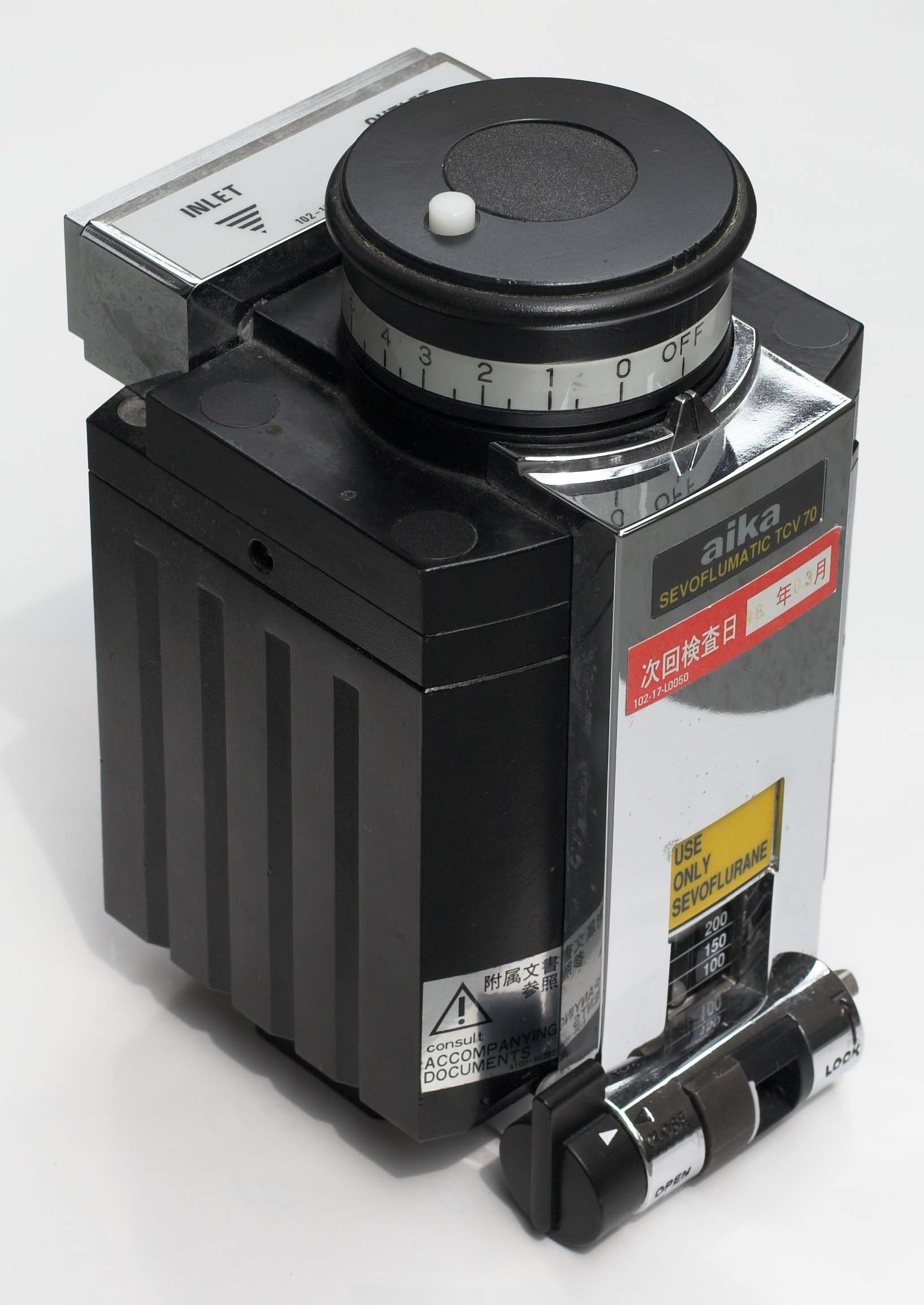
A vaporizer holds a liquid anesthetic and converts it to gas for inhalation (in this case sevoflurane).

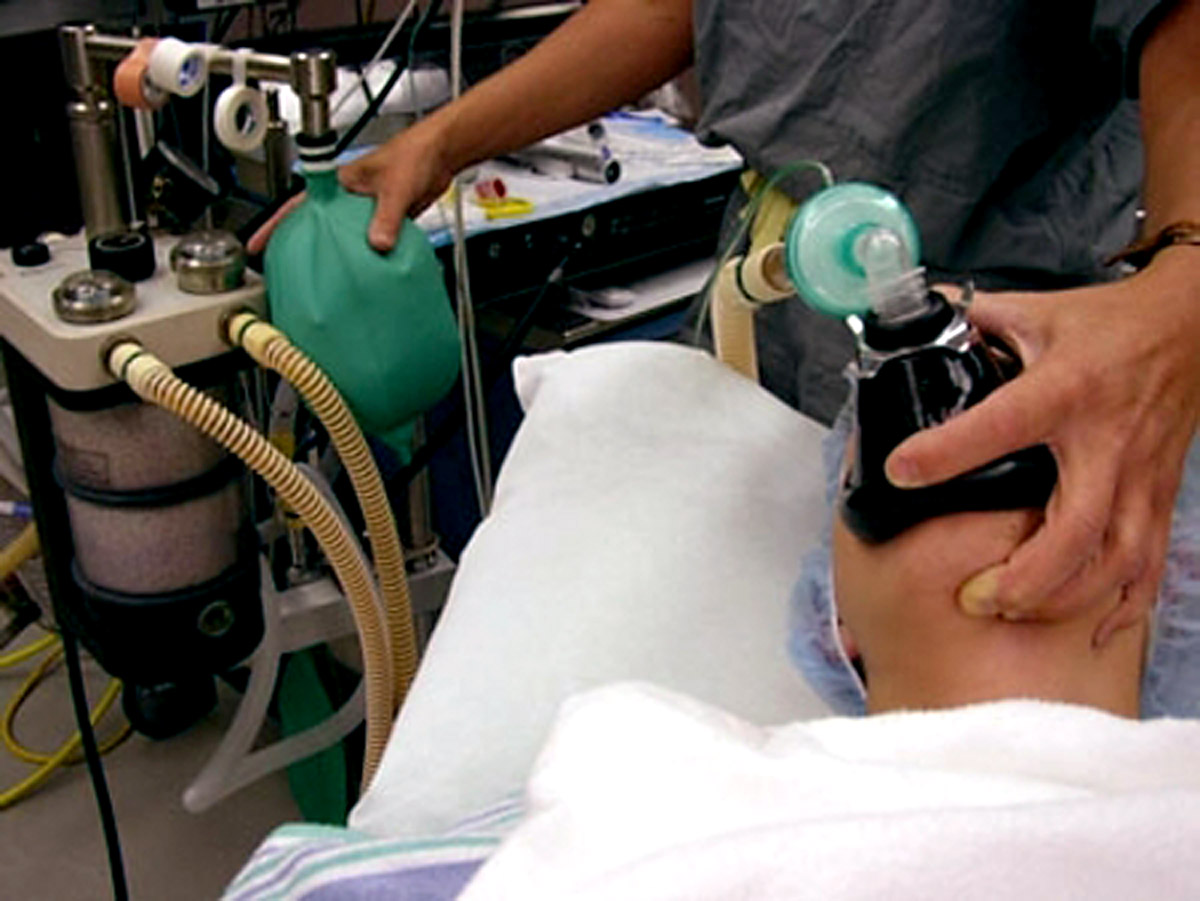
A patient receiving anesthesia through inhalation

Anesthesia is a combination of the endpoints (discussed above) that are reached by drugs acting on different but overlapping sites in the central nervous system. General anesthesia (as opposed to sedation or regional anesthesia) has three main goals: lack of movement (paralysis), unconsciousness, and blunting of the stress response. In the early days of anesthesia, anesthetics could reliably achieve the first two, allowing surgeons to perform necessary procedures, but many patients died because the extremes of blood pressure and pulse caused by the surgical insult were ultimately harmful. Eventually, the need for blunting of the surgical stress response was identified by Harvey Cushing, who injected local anesthetic prior to hernia repairs. This led to the development of other drugs that could blunt the response, leading to lower surgical mortality rates.

The most common approach to reach the endpoints of general anesthesia is through the use of inhaled general anesthetics. Each anesthetic has its own potency, which is correlated to its solubility in oil. This relationship exists because the drugs bind directly to cavities in proteins of the central nervous system, although several theories of general anesthetic action have been described. Inhalational anesthetics are thought to exact their effects on different parts of the central nervous system. For instance, the immobilizing effect of inhaled anesthetics results from an effect on the spinal cord whereas sedation, hypnosis and amnesia involve sites in the brain. The potency of an inhalational anesthetic is quantified by its minimum alveolar concentration (MAC). The MAC is the percentage dose of anesthetic that will prevent a response to painful stimulus in 50% of subjects. The higher the MAC, generally, the less potent the anesthetic.

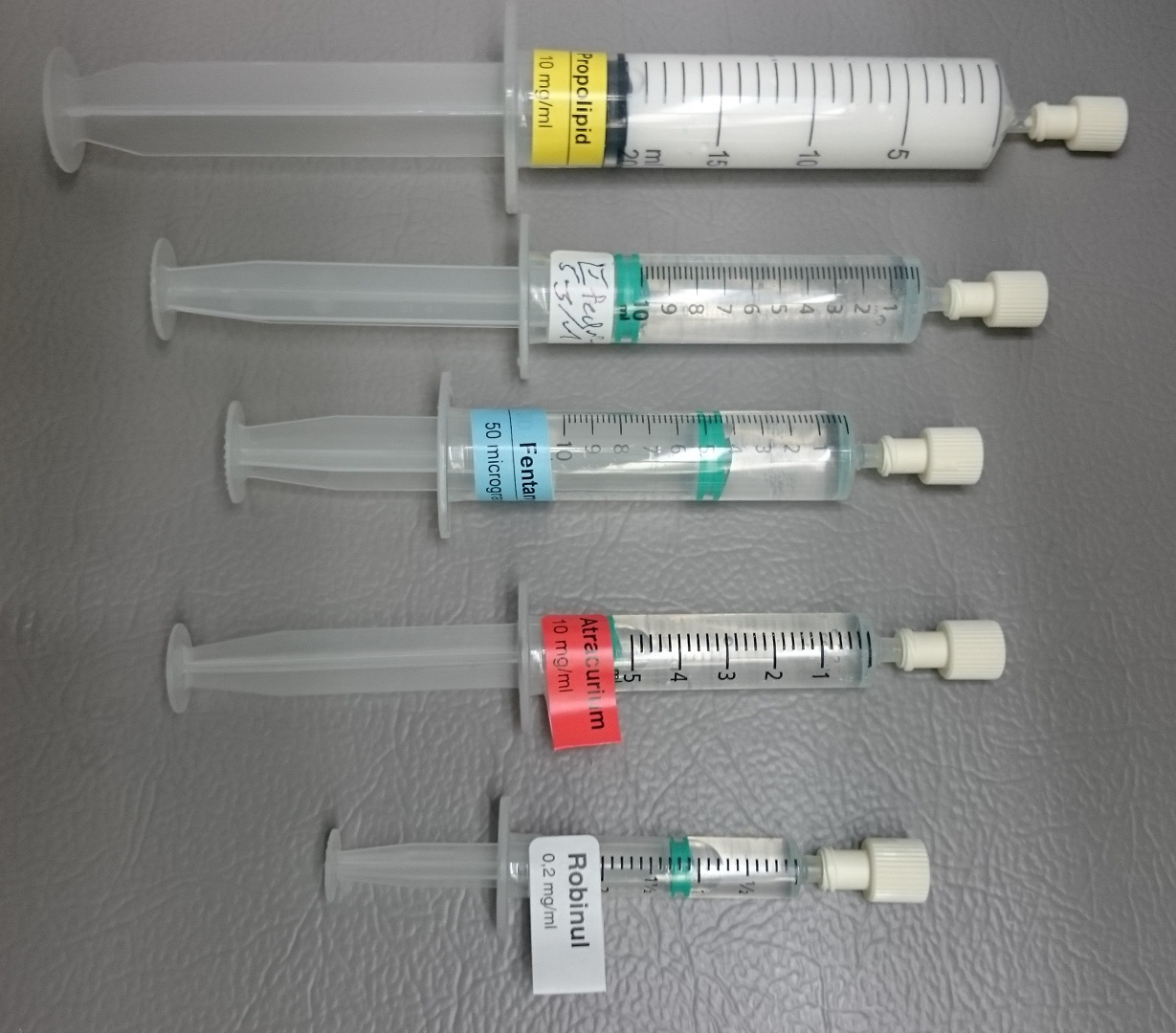
Syringes prepared with medications that are expected to be used during an operation under general anesthesia maintained by sevoflurane gas: – Propofol, a hypnotic – Ephedrine, in case of hypotension – Fentanyl, for analgesia – Atracurium, for neuromuscular blockade – Glycopyrronium bromide (here under trade name "Robinul"), reducing secretions

The ideal anesthetic drug would provide hypnosis, amnesia, analgesia, and muscle relaxation without undesirable changes in blood pressure, pulse or breathing. In the 1930s, physicians started to augment inhaled general anesthetics with intravenous general anesthetics. The drugs used in combination offered a better risk profile to the subject under anesthesia and a quicker recovery. A combination of drugs was later shown to result in lower odds of dying in the first seven days after anesthetic. For instance, propofol (injection) might be used to start the anesthetic, fentanyl (injection) used to blunt the stress response, midazolam (injection) given to ensure amnesia and sevoflurane (inhaled) during the procedure to maintain the effects. More recently, several intravenous drugs have been developed which, if desired, allow inhaled general anesthetics to be avoided completely.

==== Equipment ====
The core instrument in an inhalational anesthetic delivery system is an anesthetic machine. It has vaporizers, ventilators, an anesthetic breathing circuit, waste gas scavenging system and pressure gauges. The purpose of the anesthetic machine is to provide anesthetic gas at a constant pressure, oxygen for breathing and to remove carbon dioxide or other waste anesthetic gases. Since inhalational anesthetics are flammable, various checklists have been developed to confirm that the machine is ready for use, that the safety features are active and the electrical hazards are removed. Intravenous anesthetic is delivered either by bolus doses or an infusion pump. There are also many smaller instruments used in airway management and monitoring the patient. The common thread to modern machinery in this field is the use of fail-safe systems that decrease the odds of catastrophic misuse of the machine.

==== Monitoring ====
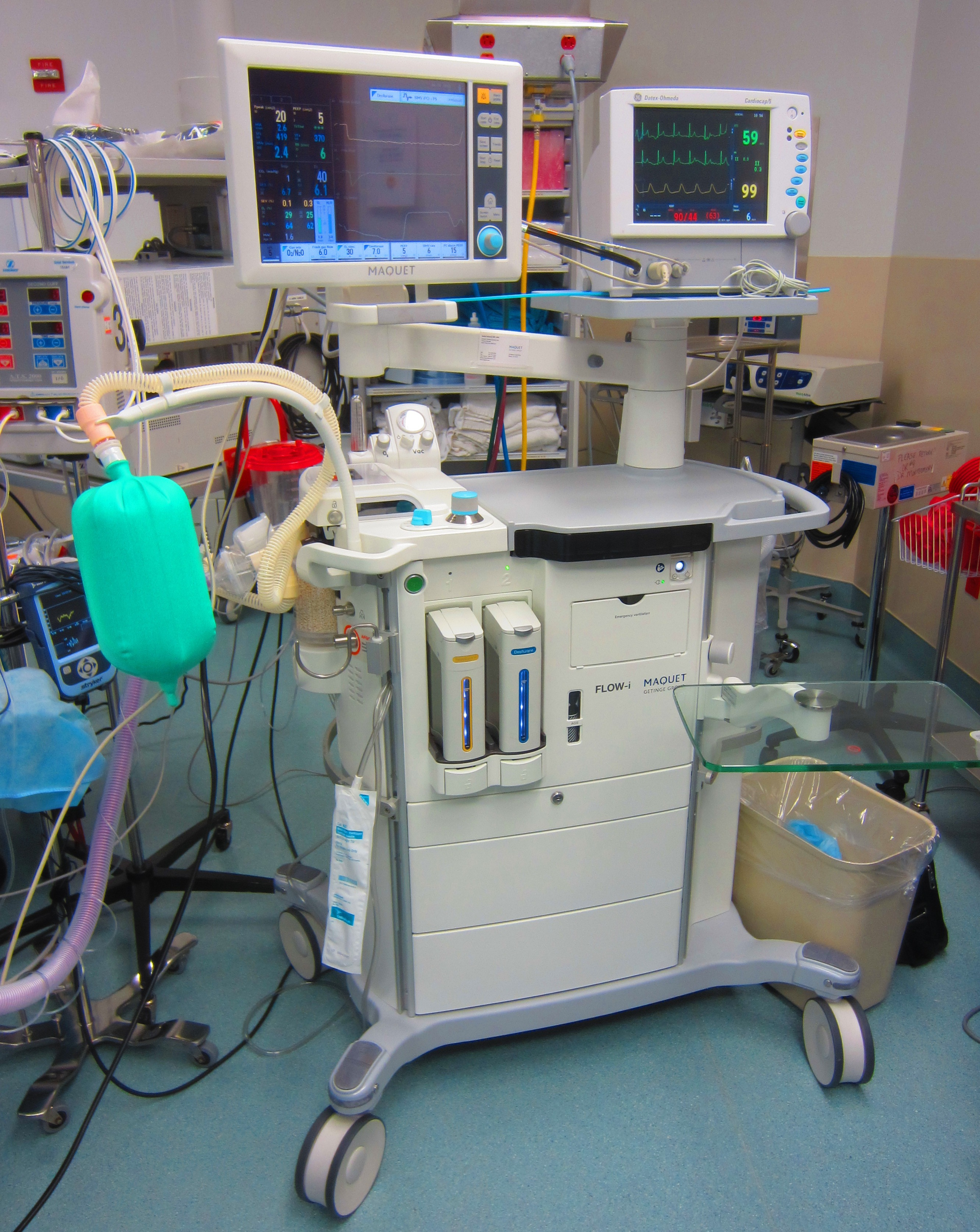
An anesthetic machine with integrated systems for monitoring of several vital parameters

Patients under general anesthesia must undergo continuous physiological monitoring to ensure safety. In the US, the American Society of Anesthesiologists (ASA) has established minimum monitoring guidelines for patients receiving general anesthesia, regional anesthesia, or sedation. These include electrocardiography (ECG), heart rate, blood pressure, inspired and expired gases, oxygen saturation of the blood (pulse oximetry), and temperature. In the UK the Association of Anaesthetists (AAGBI) have set minimum monitoring guidelines for general and regional anesthesia. For minor surgery, this generally includes monitoring of heart rate, oxygen saturation, blood pressure, and inspired and expired concentrations for oxygen, carbon dioxide, and inhalational anesthetic agents. For more invasive surgery, monitoring may also include temperature, urine output, blood pressure, central venous pressure, pulmonary artery pressure and pulmonary artery occlusion pressure, cardiac output, cerebral activity, and neuromuscular function. In addition, the operating room environment must be monitored for ambient temperature and humidity, as well as for accumulation of exhaled inhalational anesthetic agents, which might be deleterious to the health of operating room personnel.

=== Sedation ===
Sedation (also referred to as dissociative anesthesia or twilight anesthesia) creates hypnotic, sedative, anxiolytic, amnesic, anticonvulsant, and centrally produced muscle-relaxing properties. From the perspective of the person giving the sedation, the patient appears sleepy, relaxed and forgetful, allowing unpleasant procedures to be more easily completed. Sedatives such as benzodiazepines are usually given with pain relievers (such as narcotics, or local anesthetics or both) because they do not, by themselves, provide significant pain relief.

From the perspective of the subject receiving a sedative, the effect is a feeling of general relaxation, amnesia (loss of memory) and time passing quickly. Many drugs can produce a sedative effect including benzodiazepines, propofol, thiopental, ketamine and inhaled general anesthetics. The advantage of sedation over a general anesthetic is that it generally does not require support of the airway or breathing (no tracheal intubation or mechanical ventilation) and can have less of an effect on the cardiovascular system which may add to a greater margin of safety in some patients.

=== Regional anesthesia ===
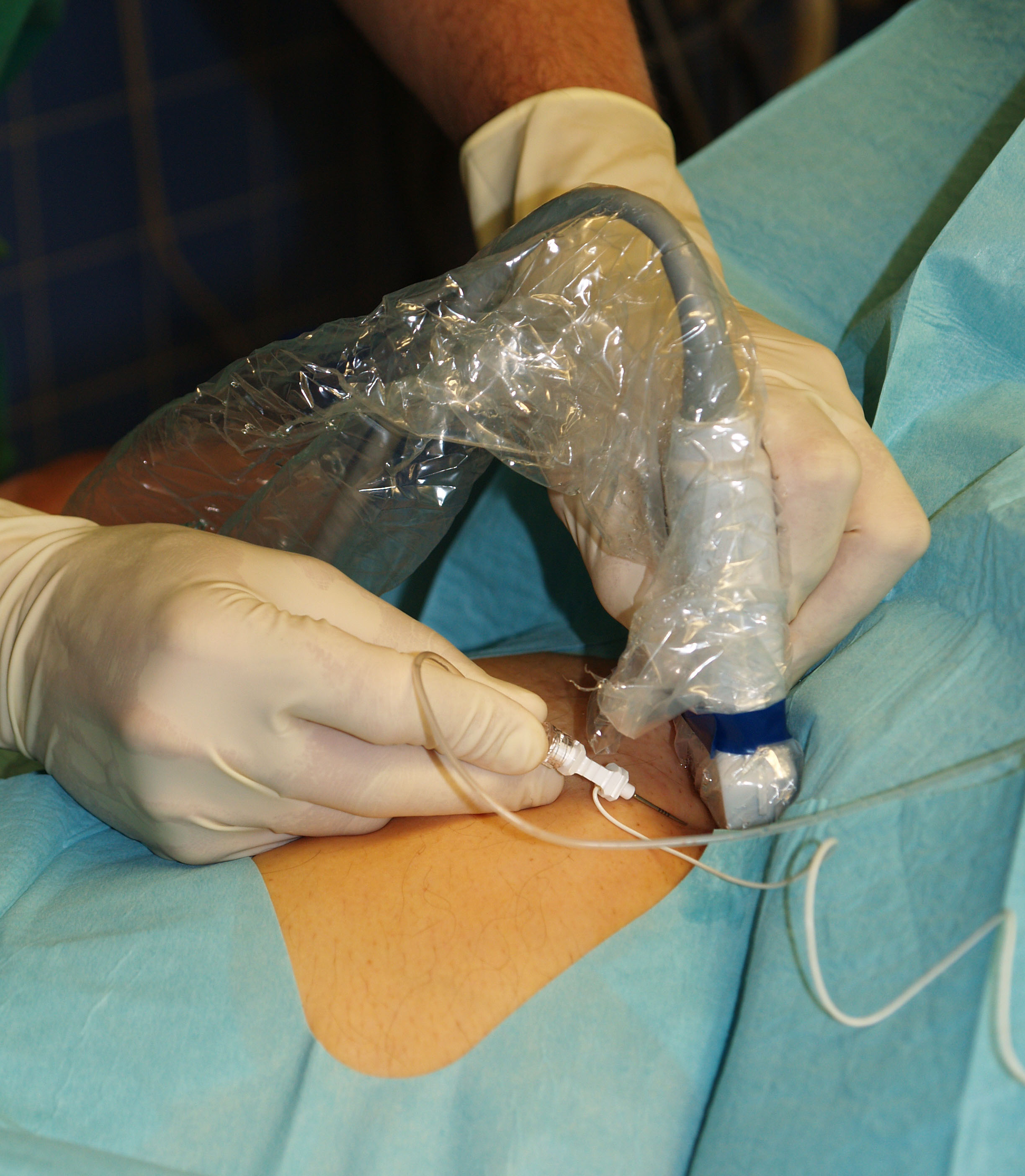
Sonography guided femoral nerve block

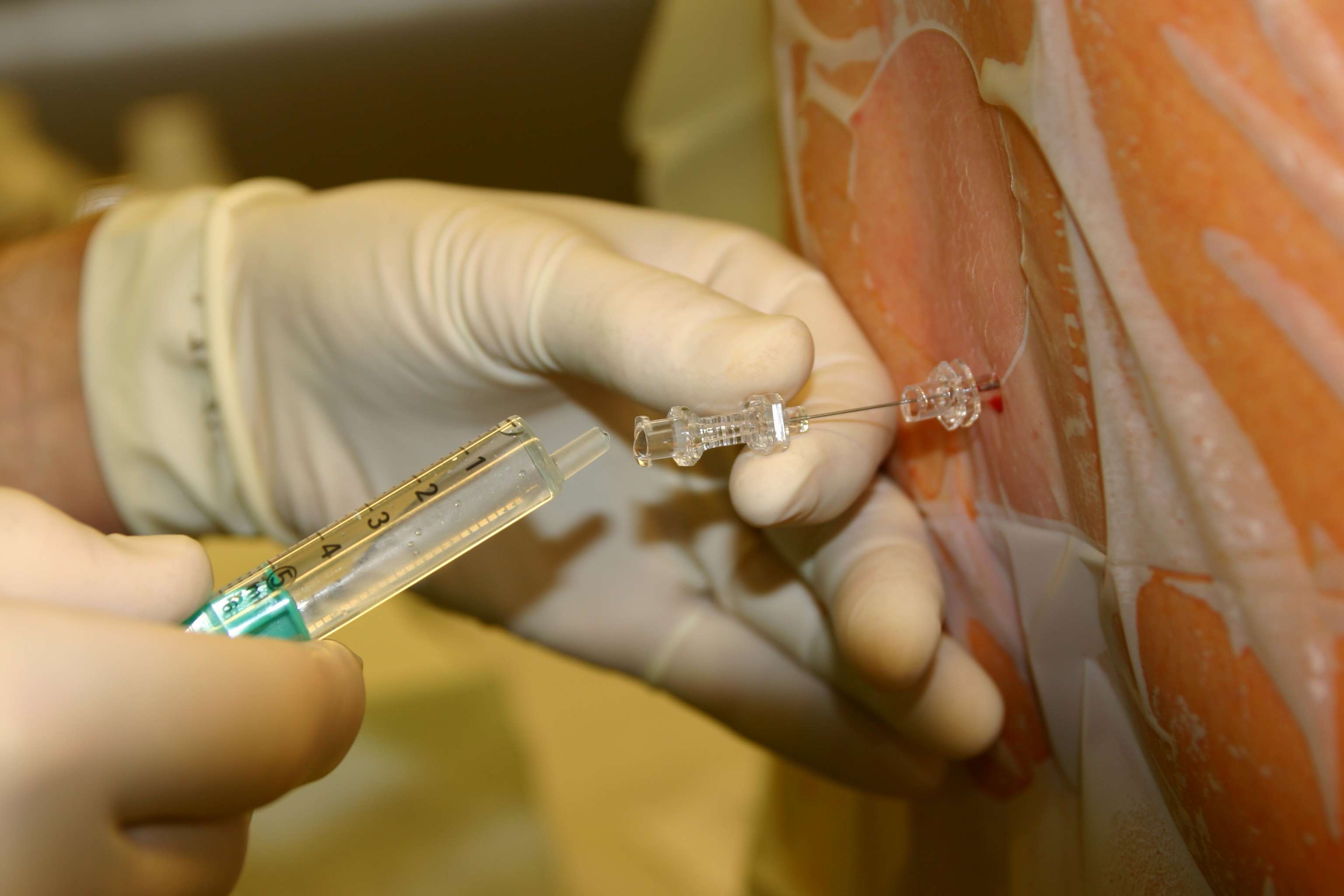
Backflow of cerebrospinal fluid through a spinal needle after puncture of the arachnoid mater during spinal anesthesia

When pain is blocked from a part of the body using local anesthetics, it is generally referred to as regional anesthesia. There are many types of regional anesthesia either by injecting into the tissue itself, a vein that feeds the area or around a nerve trunk that supplies sensation to the area. The latter are called nerve blocks and are divided into peripheral or central nerve blocks.

The following are the types of regional anesthesia:

- Infiltrative anesthesia: a small amount of local anesthetic is injected in a small area to stop any sensation (such as during the closure of a laceration, as a continuous infusion or "freezing" a tooth). The effect is almost immediate.
- Peripheral nerve block: local anesthetic is injected near a nerve that provides sensation to particular portion of the body. There is significant variation in the speed of onset and duration of anesthesia depending on the potency of the drug (e.g. Mandibular block, Fascia Iliaca Compartment Block).
- Intravenous regional anesthesia (also called a Bier block): dilute local anesthetic is infused to a limb through a vein with a tourniquet placed to prevent the drug from diffusing out of the limb.
- Central nerve block: Local anesthetic is injected or infused in or around a portion of the central nervous system (discussed in more detail below in spinal, epidural and caudal anesthesia).
- Topical anesthesia: local anesthetics that are specially formulated to diffuse through the mucous membranes or skin to give a thin layer of analgesia to an area (e.g. EMLA patches).
- Tumescent anesthesia: a large amount of very dilute local anesthetics are injected into the subcutaneous tissues during liposuction.
- Systemic local anesthetics: local anesthetics are given systemically (orally or intravenous) to relieve neuropathic pain.

A 2018 Cochrane review found moderate quality evidence that regional anesthesia may reduce the frequency of persistent postoperative pain (PPP) from 3 to 18 months following thoracotomy and 3 to 12 months following caesarean. Low quality evidence was found 3 to 12 months following breast cancer surgery. This review acknowledges certain limitations that impact its applicability beyond the surgeries and regional anesthesia techniques reviewed.

==== Nerve blocks ====
When local anesthetic is injected around a larger diameter nerve that transmits sensation from an entire region it is referred to as a nerve block or regional nerve blockade. Nerve blocks are commonly used in dentistry, when the mandibular nerve is blocked for procedures on the lower teeth. With larger diameter nerves (such as the interscalene block for upper limbs or psoas compartment block for lower limbs) the nerve and position of the needle is localized with ultrasound or electrical stimulation. Evidence supports the use of ultrasound guidance alone, or in combination with peripheral nerve stimulation, as superior for improved sensory and motor block, a reduction in the need for supplementation and fewer complications. Because of the large amount of local anesthetic required to affect the nerve, the maximum dose of local anesthetic has to be considered. Nerve blocks are also used as a continuous infusion, following major surgery such as knee, hip and shoulder replacement surgery, and may be associated with lower complications. Nerve blocks are also associated with a lower risk of neurologic complications compared to the more central epidural or spinal neuraxial blocks.

==== Spinal, epidural and caudal anesthesia ====
Central neuraxial anesthesia is the injection of local anesthetic around the spinal cord to provide analgesia in the abdomen, pelvis or lower extremities. It is divided into either spinal (injection into the subarachnoid space), epidural (injection outside of the subarachnoid space into the epidural space) and caudal (injection into the cauda equina or tail end of the spinal cord). Spinal and epidural are the most commonly used forms of central neuraxial blockade.

Spinal anesthesia is a "one-shot" injection that provides rapid onset and profound sensory anesthesia with lower doses of anesthetic, and is usually associated with neuromuscular blockade (loss of muscle control). Epidural anesthesia uses larger doses of anesthetic infused through an indwelling catheter which allows the anesthetic to be augmented should the effects begin to dissipate. Epidural anesthesia does not typically affect muscle control.

Because central neuraxial blockade causes arterial and venous vasodilation, a drop in blood pressure is common. This drop is largely dictated by the venous side of the circulatory system which holds 75% of the circulating blood volume. The physiologic effects are much greater when the block is placed above the 5th thoracic vertebra. An ineffective block is most often due to inadequate anxiolysis or sedation rather than a failure of the block itself.

=== Acute pain management ===
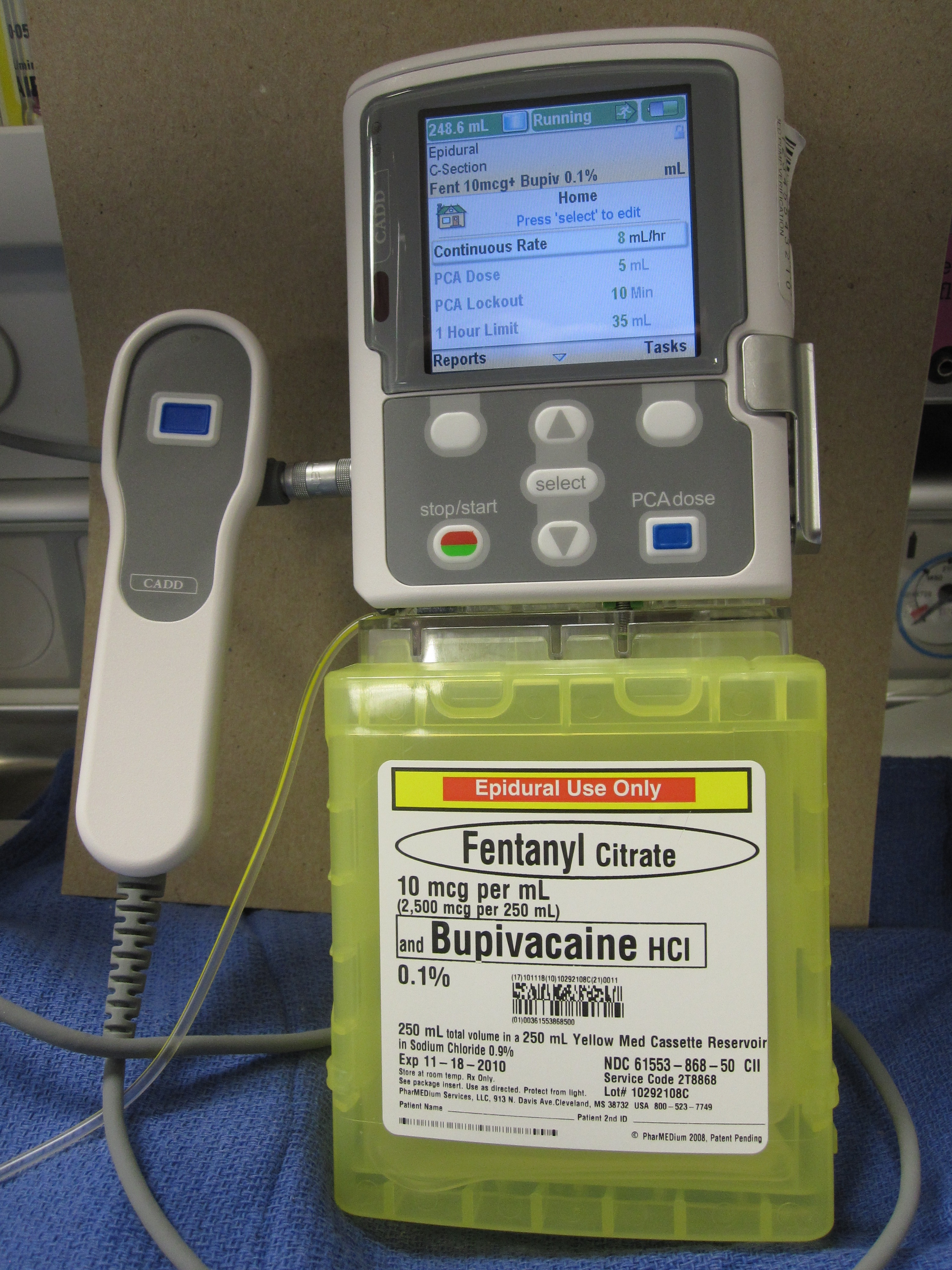
A patient-controlled analgesia infusion pump, configured for epidural administration of fentanyl and bupivacaine for postoperative analgesia

Nociception (pain sensation) is not hard-wired into the body. Instead, it is a dynamic process wherein persistent painful stimuli can sensitize the system and either make pain management difficult or promote the development of chronic pain. For this reason, preemptive acute pain management may reduce both acute and chronic pain and is tailored to the surgery, the environment in which it is given (in-patient/out-patient) and the individual.

Pain management is classified into either pre-emptive or on-demand. On-demand pain medications typically include either opioid or non-steroidal anti-inflammatory drugs but can also make use of novel approaches such as inhaled nitrous oxide or ketamine. On demand drugs can be administered by a clinician ("as needed drug orders") or by the patient using patient-controlled analgesia (PCA). PCA has been shown to provide slightly better pain control and increased patient satisfaction when compared with conventional methods. Common preemptive approaches include epidural neuraxial blockade or nerve blocks. One review which looked at pain control after abdominal aortic surgery found that epidural blockade provides better pain relief (especially during movement) in the period up to three postoperative days. It reduces the duration of postoperative tracheal intubation by roughly half. The occurrence of prolonged postoperative mechanical ventilation and myocardial infarction is also reduced by epidural analgesia.

== Risks and complications ==
Risks and complications as they relate to anesthesia are classified as either morbidity (a disease or disorder that results from anesthesia) or mortality (death that results from anesthesia). Quantifying how anesthesia contributes to morbidity and mortality can be difficult because the patient's health prior to surgery and the complexity of the surgical procedure can also contribute to the risks.

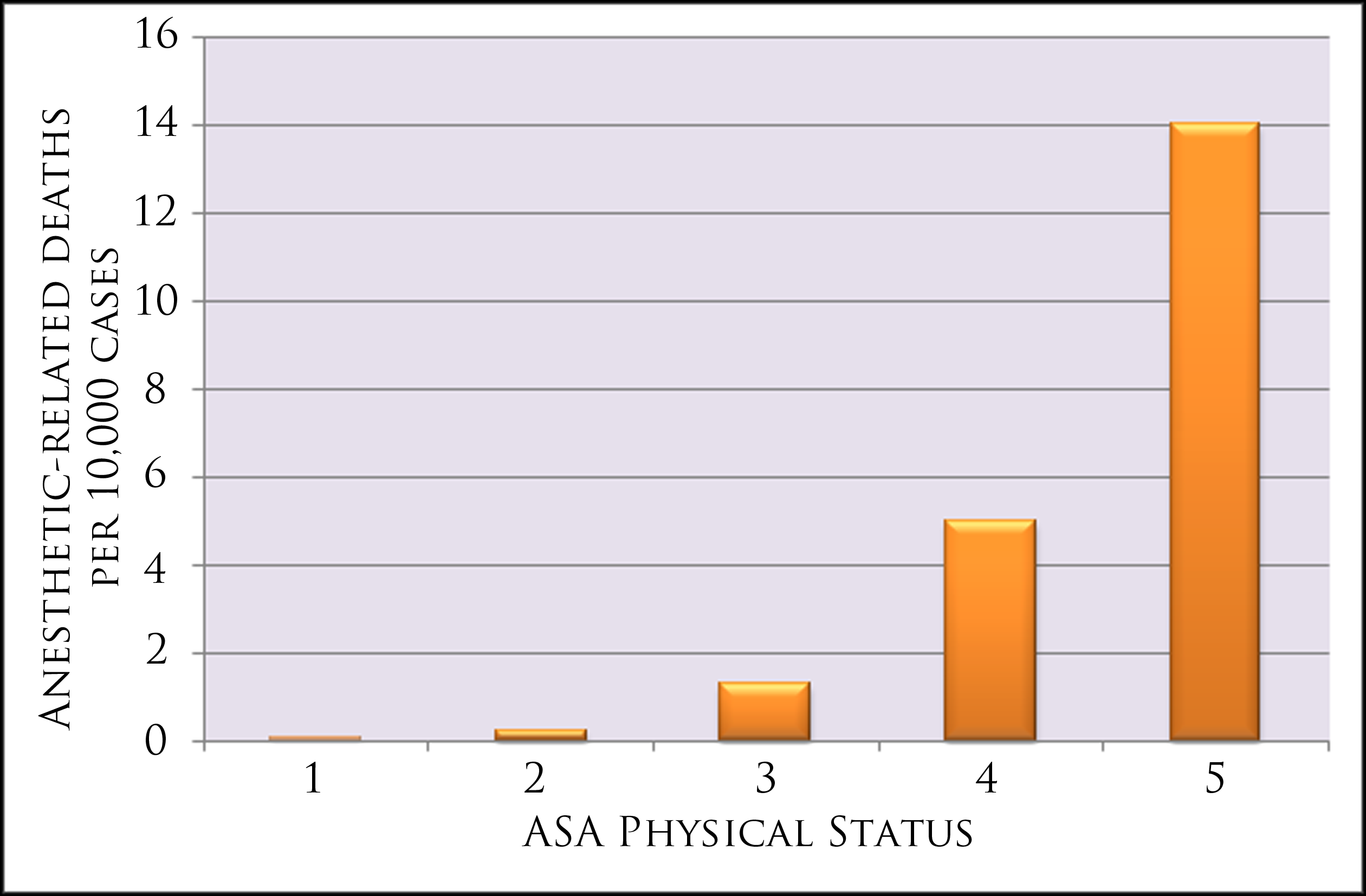
Anesthesia-related deaths by ASA status

Prior to the introduction of anesthesia in the early 19th century, the physiologic stress from surgery caused significant complications and many deaths from shock. The faster the surgery was, the lower the rate of complications (leading to reports of very quick amputations). The advent of anesthesia allowed more complicated and life-saving surgery to be completed, decreased the physiologic stress of the surgery, but added an element of risk. It was two years after the introduction of ether anesthetics that the first death directly related to the use of anesthesia was reported.

Morbidity can be major (myocardial infarction, pneumonia, pulmonary embolism, kidney failure/chronic kidney disease, postoperative cognitive dysfunction and allergy) or minor (minor nausea, vomiting, readmission). There is usually overlap in the contributing factors that lead to morbidity and mortality between the health of the patients, the type of surgery being performed and the anesthetic. To understand the relative risk of each contributing factor, consider that the rate of deaths totally attributed to the patient's health is 1:870. Compare that to the rate of deaths totally attributed to surgical factors (1:2860) or anesthesia alone (1:185,056) illustrating that the single greatest factor in anesthetic mortality is the health of the patient. These statistics can also be compared to the first such study on mortality in anesthesia from 1954, which reported a rate of death from all causes at 1:75 and a rate attributed to anesthesia alone at 1:2680. Direct comparisons between mortality statistics cannot reliably be made over time and across countries because of differences in the stratification of risk factors, however, there is evidence that anesthetics have made a significant improvement in safety but to what degree is uncertain.

Rather than stating a flat rate of morbidity or mortality, many factors are reported as contributing to the relative risk of the procedure and anesthetic combined. For instance, an operation on a person who is between the ages of 60–79 years old places the patient at 2.3 times greater risk than someone less than 60 years old. Having an ASA score of 3, 4 or 5 places the person at 10.7 times greater risk than someone with an ASA score of 1 or 2. Other variables include age greater than 80 (3.3 times risk compared to those under 60), gender (females have a lower risk of 0.8), urgency of the procedure (emergencies have a 4.4 times greater risk), experience of the person completing the procedure (less than 8 years experience and/or less than 600 cases have a 1.1 times greater risk) and the type of anesthetic (regional anesthetics are lower risk than general anesthetics). Obstetrical, the very young and the very old are all at greater risk of complication so extra precautions may need to be taken.

On 14 December 2016, the Food and Drug Administration issued a Public Safety Communication warning that "repeated or lengthy use of general anesthetic and sedation drugs during surgeries or procedures in children younger than 3 years or in pregnant women during their third trimester may affect the development of children's brains." The warning was criticized by the American College of Obstetricians and Gynecologists, which pointed out the absence of direct evidence regarding use in pregnant women and the possibility that "this warning could inappropriately dissuade providers from providing medically indicated care during pregnancy." Some patient advocates have argued that a randomized clinical trial would be unethical to conduct, and that the mechanism of injury is well-established in animal studies. A population-based cohort study found that children exposed to two anesthetics before age four had an increased risk of later learning disability (hazard ratio 1.59, 95% confidence interval 1.06–2.37), rising further with three or more exposures (hazard ratio 2.60, 95% confidence interval 1.60–4.24); a single exposure showed no significant increase in risk (hazard ratio 1.0, 95% confidence interval 0.79–1.27).

== Recovery ==
The immediate time after anesthesia is called emergence. Emergence from general anesthesia or sedation requires careful monitoring because there is still a risk of complication. Nausea and vomiting are reported at 9.8% but will vary with the type of anesthetic and procedure. There is a need for airway support in 6.8%, there can be urinary retention (more common in those over 50 years of age) and hypotension in 2.7%. Hypothermia, shivering and confusion are also common in the immediate postoperative period because of the lack of muscle movement (and subsequent lack of heat production) during the procedure. Furthermore, the rare manifestation in the post-anesthetic period may be the occurrence of functional neurological symptom disorder (FNSD).

Postoperative cognitive dysfunction (also known as POCD and post-anesthetic confusion) is a disturbance in cognition after surgery. It may also be variably used to describe emergence delirium (immediate postoperative confusion) and early cognitive dysfunction (diminished cognitive function in the first postoperative week). Although the three entities (delirium, early POCD and long-term POCD) are separate, the presence of delirium postoperatively predicts the presence of early POCD. There does not appear to be an association between delirium or early POCD and long-term POCD. According to a recent study conducted at the David Geffen School of Medicine at UCLA, the brain navigates its way through a series of activity clusters, or "hubs" on its way back to consciousness. Andrew Hudson, an assistant professor in anesthesiology states, "Recovery from anesthesia is not simply the result of the anesthetic 'wearing off,' but also of the brain finding its way back through a maze of possible activity states to those that allow conscious experience. Put simply, the brain reboots itself."

Long-term POCD is a subtle deterioration in cognitive function, that can last for weeks, months, or longer. Most commonly, relatives of the person report a lack of attention, memory and loss of interest in activities previously dear to the person (such as crosswords). In a similar way, people in the workforce may report an inability to complete tasks at the same speed they could previously. There is good evidence that POCD occurs after cardiac surgery and the major reason for its occurrence is the formation of microemboli. POCD also appears to occur in non-cardiac surgery. Its causes in non-cardiac surgery are less clear but older age is a risk factor for its occurrence.

== History ==
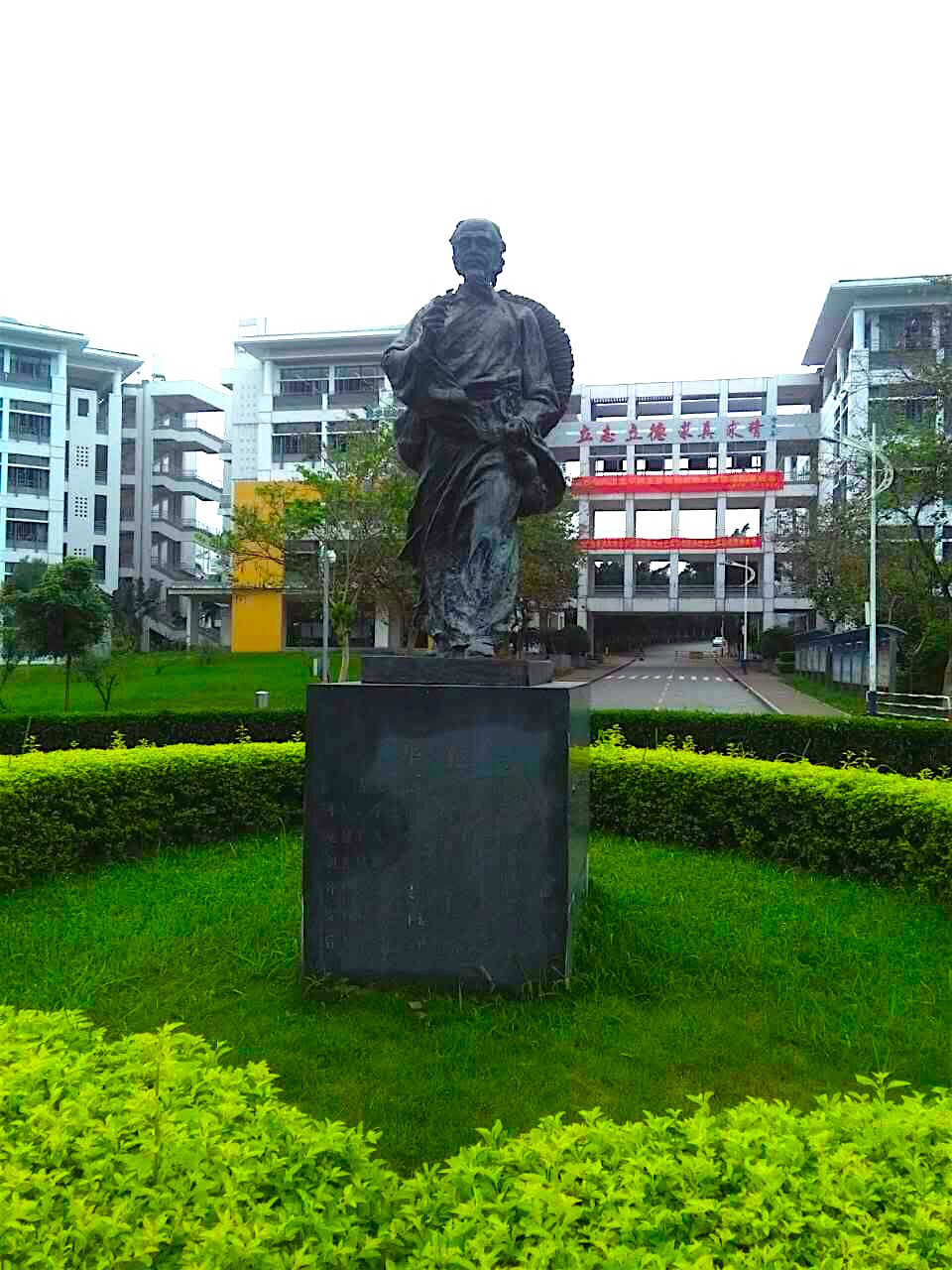
A statue in Guangdong Medical University in honor of Hua Tuo

The first attempts at general anesthesia were probably herbal remedies administered in prehistory. Alcohol is one of the oldest known sedatives and it was used in ancient Mesopotamia thousands of years ago. The Sumerians are said to have cultivated and harvested the opium poppy (Papaver somniferum) in lower Mesopotamia as early as 3400 BCE. The ancient Egyptians had some surgical instruments, as well as crude analgesics and sedatives, including possibly an extract prepared from the mandrake fruit.

In China, Bian Que (c. 300 BCE) was a legendary Chinese internist and surgeon who reportedly used general anesthesia for surgical procedures. Despite this, it was the Chinese physician Hua Tuo whom historians considered the first verifiable historical figure to develop a type of mixture of anesthesia, though his recipe has yet to be fully discovered. In Ming China, iron tools with aconitine residue from the tomb of a doctor named Xia Quan (1348–1411 CE) suggests the use of wolfsbane as anesthetic.

Throughout Europe, Asia, and the Americas, a variety of Solanum species containing potent tropane alkaloids was used for anesthesia. In 13th-century Italy, Theodoric Borgognoni used similar mixtures along with opiates to induce unconsciousness, and treatment with the combined alkaloids proved a mainstay of anesthesia until the 19th century. Local anesthetics were used in Inca civilization where shamans chewed coca leaves and performed operations on the skull while spitting into the wounds they had inflicted to anesthetize. Cocaine was later isolated and became the first effective local anesthetic. It was first used in eye surgery in 1884 by Karl Koller, at the suggestion of Sigmund Freud. German surgeon August Bier (1861–1949) was the first to use cocaine for intrathecal anesthesia in 1898. Romanian surgeon Nicolae Racoviceanu-Piteşti (1860–1942) was the first to use opioids for intrathecal analgesia; he presented his experience in Paris in 1901.

The "soporific sponge" ("sleep sponge") used by Arabic physicians was introduced to Europe by the Salerno school of medicine in the late 12th century and by Ugo Borgognoni (1180–1258) in the 13th century. The sponge was promoted and described by Ugo's son and fellow surgeon, Theodoric Borgognoni (1205–1298). In this anesthetic method, a sponge was soaked in a dissolved solution of opium, mandragora, hemlock juice, and other substances. The sponge was then dried and stored; just before surgery the sponge was moistened and then held under the patient's nose. When all went well, the fumes rendered the individual unconscious.

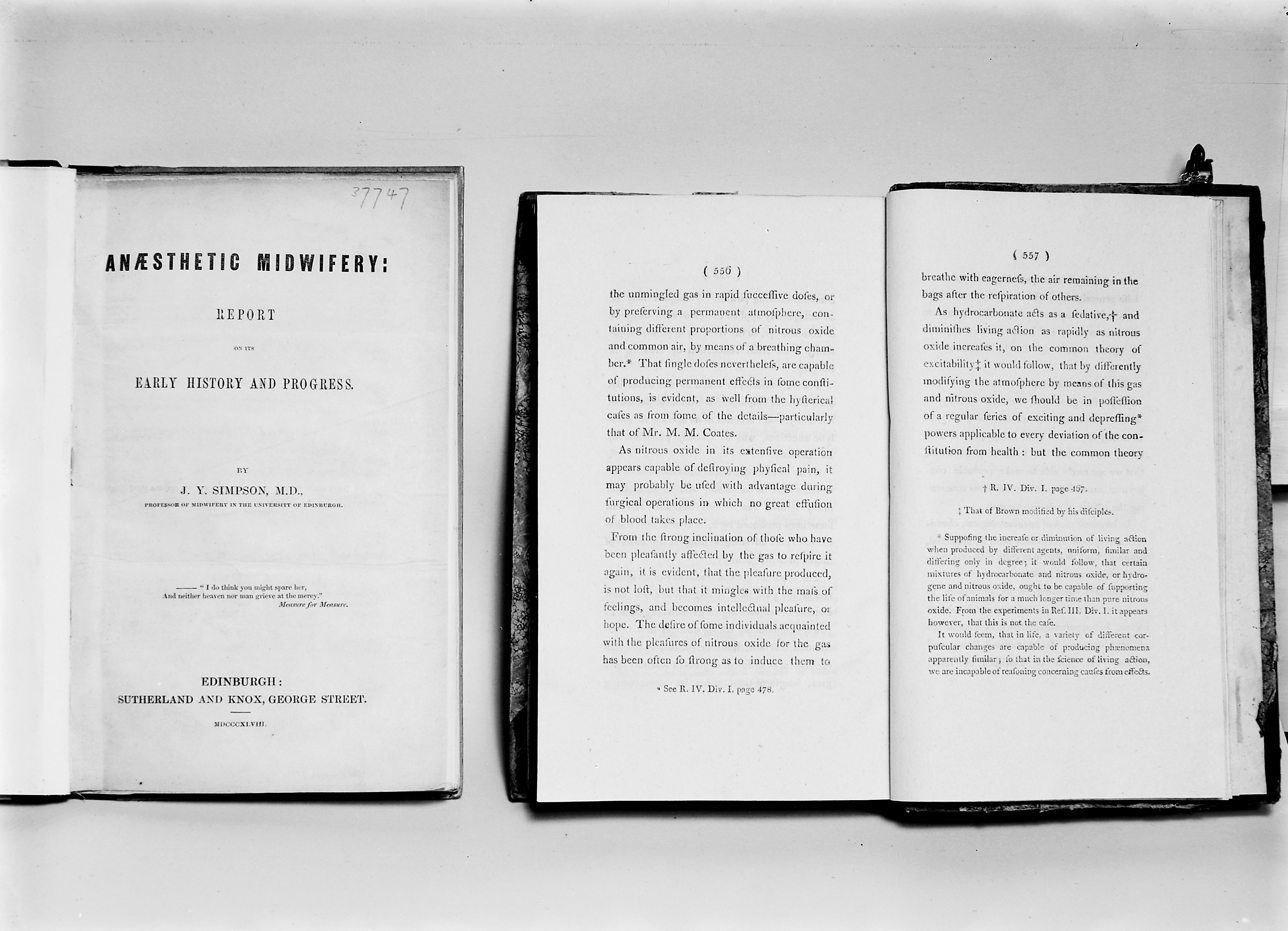
Sir Humphry Davy's Researches chemical and philosophical: chiefly concerning nitrous oxide (1800), pp. 556 and 557 (right), outlining potential anesthetic properties of nitrous oxide in relieving pain during surgery

The most famous anesthetic, ether, may have been synthesized as early as the eighth century, but it took many centuries for its anesthetic importance to be appreciated. The Swiss 16th century physician and polymath Paracelsus was the first to test ether, on both chickens and stray dogs. He noted that the etherized chickens not only fell asleep, but also seemed to feel no pain. In order to use ether as an anesthetic, Paracelsus made the test animals consume it by mixing it in with their food. By performing these tests, he ultimately became the world's first medical chemist. By the early nineteenth century, humans were using ether, but not as an anesthetic.

Meanwhile, in 1772, English scientist Joseph Priestley discovered the gas nitrous oxide. Initially, people thought this gas to be lethal, even in small doses, like some other nitrogen oxides. However, in 1799, British chemist and inventor Humphry Davy decided to find out by experimenting on himself. To his astonishment he found that nitrous oxide made him laugh, so he nicknamed it "laughing gas". In 1800 Davy wrote about the potential anesthetic properties of nitrous oxide in relieving pain during surgery, but nobody at that time pursued the matter any further.

On 14 November 1804, Hanaoka Seishū, a Japanese doctor, became the first person to successfully perform surgery using general anesthesia. Hanaoka learned traditional Japanese medicine as well as Dutch-imported European surgery and Chinese medicine. After years of research and experimentation, he finally developed a formula which he named tsūsensan (also known as mafutsu-san), which combined Korean morning glory and other herbs.

Hanaoka's success in performing this painless operation soon became widely known, and patients began to arrive from all parts of Japan. Hanaoka went on to perform many operations using tsūsensan. Before his death in 1835, Hanaoka performed more than 150 operations for breast cancer. However, this finding did not benefit the rest of the world until 1854 as the national isolation policy of the Tokugawa shogunate prevented Hanaoka's achievements from being publicized until after the isolation ended. Nearly forty years would pass before Crawford Long, who is titled as the inventor of modern anesthetics in the West, used general anesthesia in Jefferson, Georgia.

Long noticed that his friends felt no pain when they injured themselves while staggering around under the influence of diethyl ether. He immediately thought of its potential in surgery. Conveniently, a participant in one of those "ether frolics", a student named James Venable, had two small tumors he wanted excised. But fearing the pain of surgery, Venable kept putting the operation off. Hence, Long suggested that he have his operation while under the influence of ether. Venable agreed, and on 30 March 1842 he underwent a painless operation. However, Long did not announce his discovery until 1849.

Published by Horace Wells in 1847. Wells describes his experiences with nitrous oxide and the failed public demonstration.

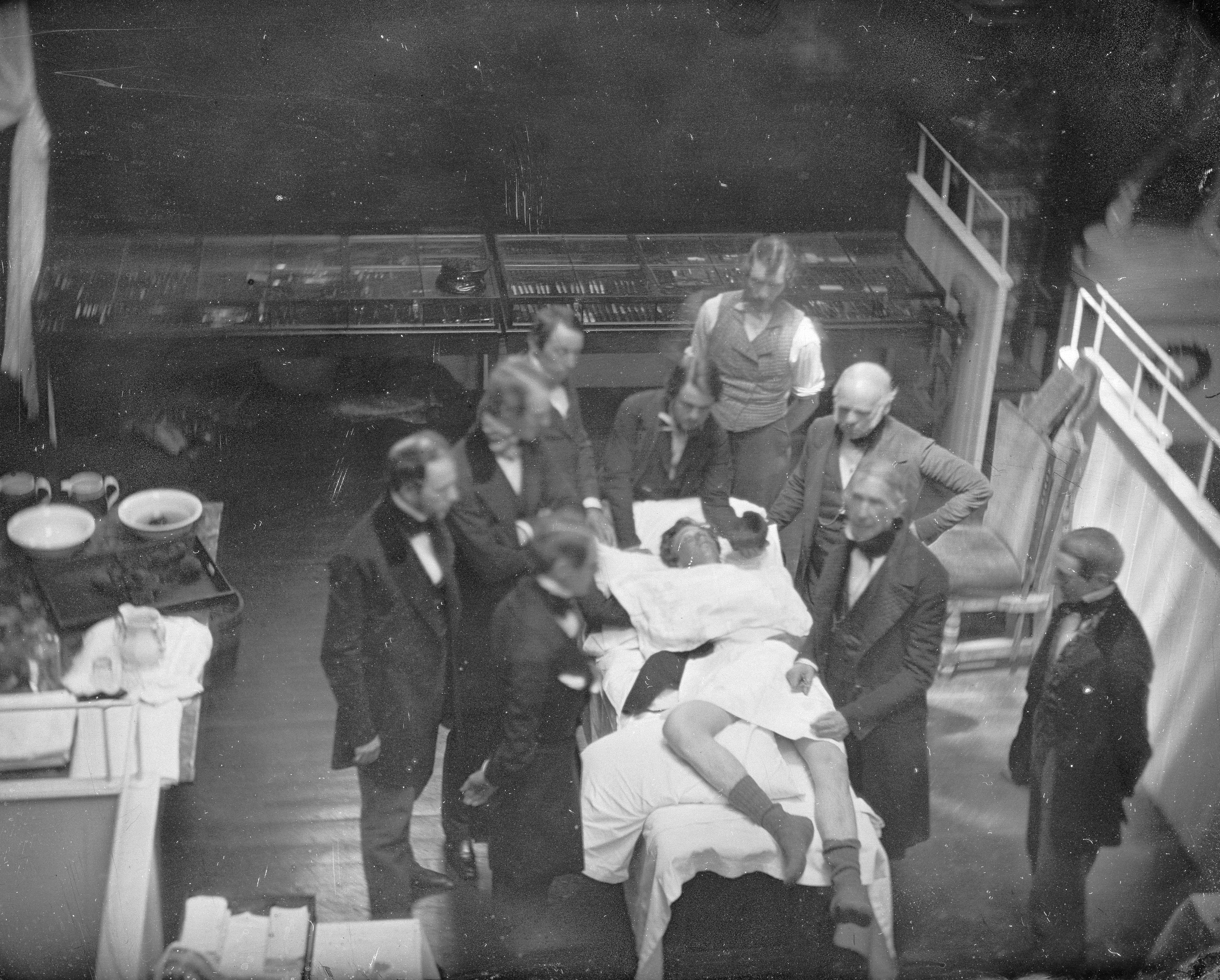
Historic image of an early ether operation conducted at Massachusetts General Hospital. The daguerreotype was taken by Southworth & Hawes on July 3, 1847.

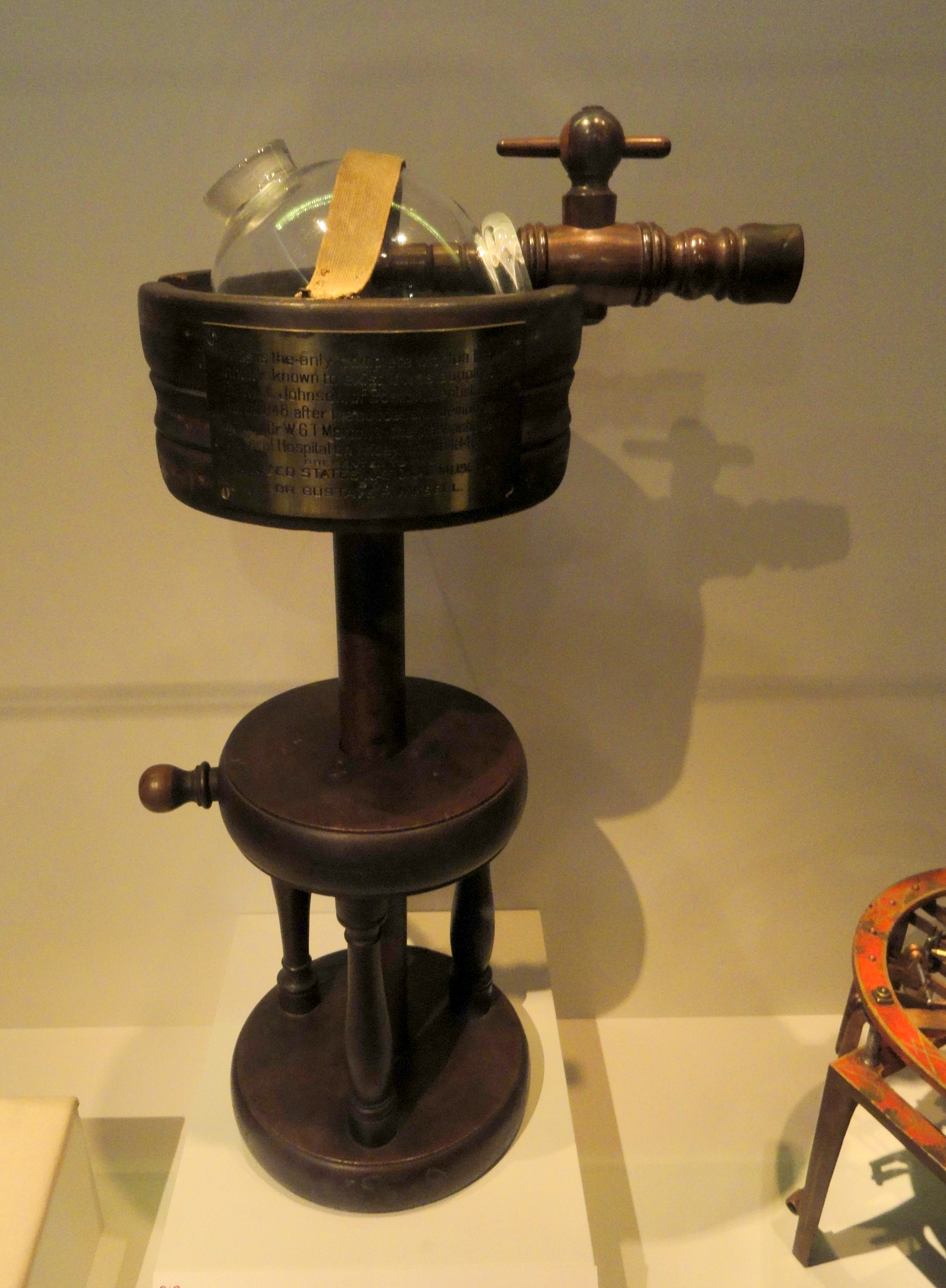
Morton's ether inhaler

Horace Wells was one of the first dentists to take advantage of the pain-relieving benefits of nitrous oxide. Wells once noticed that a patient who inhaled nitrous oxide did not feel any pain and decided to test it on himself. Using the assistance of Gardner Quincy Colton, a medical student, Colton administered nitrous oxide to Wells for a tooth removal. The experiment was a success and led Wells to administer nitrous oxide to his patients for dental procedures. The procedures were successful and Wells conducted the first public demonstration of this inhalational anesthetic at the Massachusetts General Hospital in Boston in 1845. However, the nitrous oxide was improperly administered and the person cried out in pain.

On October 16, 1846, Boston dentist William Thomas Green Morton perfected the ether dome to administer general anesthesia. Morton gave a successful public demonstration using diethyl ether to medical students at the same hospital. Morton, who was unaware of Crawford Long's previous work, was invited to the Massachusetts General Hospital to demonstrate his new technique for painless surgery. After Morton had induced anesthesia via ether, surgeon John Collins Warren removed a tumor from the neck of Edward Gilbert Abbott. This occurred in the surgical amphitheater now called the Ether Dome. In a letter to Morton shortly thereafter, physician and writer Oliver Wendell Holmes Sr. proposed naming the state produced "anesthesia", and the procedure an "anesthetic".

Morton at first attempted to hide the actual nature of his anesthetic substance, referring to it as Letheon. He received a US patent for his substance, but news of the successful anesthetic spread quickly by late 1846. Respected surgeons in Europe including Liston, Dieffenbach, Pirogov, and Syme quickly undertook numerous operations with ether. An American-born physician, Boott, encouraged London dentist James Robinson to perform a dental procedure on a Miss Lonsdale. This was the first case of an operator-anesthetist. On the same day, 19 December 1846, in Dumfries Royal Infirmary, Scotland, a Dr. Scott used ether for a surgical procedure. The first use of anesthesia in the Southern Hemisphere took place in Launceston, Tasmania, that same year. Drawbacks with ether such as excessive vomiting and its explosive flammability led to its replacement in England with chloroform.

Discovered in 1831 by an American physician Samuel Guthrie (1782–1848), and independently a few months later by Frenchman Eugène Soubeiran (1797–1859) and Justus von Liebig (1803–1873) in Germany, chloroform was named and chemically characterized in 1834 by Jean-Baptiste Dumas (1800–1884). In 1842, Dr Robert Mortimer Glover discovered the anesthetic qualities of chloroform.

In 1847, Scottish obstetrician James Young Simpson was the first to demonstrate the anesthetic properties of chloroform on humans and helped to popularize the drug for use in medicine. This first supply came from local pharmacists, James Duncan and William Flockhart, and its use spread quickly, with 750,000 doses weekly in Britain by 1895. Simpson arranged for Flockhart to supply Florence Nightingale. Chloroform gained royal approval in 1853 when John Snow administered it to Queen Victoria when she was in labor with Prince Leopold. For the experience of child birth itself, chloroform met all the Queen's expectations; she stated it was "delightful beyond measure". Chloroform was not without fault though. The first fatality directly attributed to chloroform administration was recorded on 28 January 1848 after the death of Hannah Greener. This was the first of many deaths to follow from the untrained handling of chloroform. Surgeons began to appreciate the need for a trained anesthetist. The need, as Thatcher writes, was for an anesthetist to "(1) Be satisfied with the subordinate role that the work would require, (2) Make anesthesia their one absorbing interest, (3) not look at the situation of anesthetist as one that put them in a position to watch and learn from the surgeons technique (4) accept the comparatively low pay and (5) have the natural aptitude and intelligence to develop a high level of skill in providing the smooth anesthesia and relaxation that the surgeon demanded" These qualities of an anesthetist were often found in submissive medical students and even members of the public. More often, surgeons sought out nurses to provide anesthesia. By the time of the Civil War, many nurses had been professionally trained with the support of surgeons.

John Snow of London published articles from May 1848 onwards "On Narcotism by the Inhalation of Vapours" in the London Medical Gazette. Snow also involved himself in the production of equipment needed for the administration of inhalational anesthetics, the forerunner of today's anesthesia machines.

Alice Magaw, born in November 1860, is often referred to as "The Mother of Anesthesia". Her renown as the personal anesthesia provider for William and Charles Mayo was solidified by Mayo's own words in his 1905 article in which he described his satisfaction with and reliance on nurse anesthetists: "The question of anaesthesia is a most important one. We have regular anaesthetists [on] whom we can depend so that I can devote my entire attention to the surgical work." Magaw kept thorough records of her cases and recorded these anesthetics. In her publication reviewing more than 14,000 surgical anesthetics, Magaw indicates she successfully provided anesthesia without an anesthetic-related death. Magaw describes in another article, "We have administered an anesthetic 1,092 times; ether alone 674 times; chloroform 245 times; ether and chloroform combined 173 times. I can report that out of this number, 1,092 cases, we have not had an accident". Magaw's records and outcomes contributed to establishing that anesthesia delivered by nurses could serve the surgical community without increasing risk to patients. Nursing historian Victoria Goode has cited Magaw's case series as an early example of what would today be called evidence-based practice.

The first comprehensive medical textbook on the subject, Anesthesia, was authored in 1914 by anesthesiologist Dr. James Tayloe Gwathmey and the chemist Dr. Charles Baskerville. This book served as the standard reference for the specialty for decades and included details on the history of anesthesia as well as the physiology and techniques of inhalation, rectal, intravenous, and spinal anesthesia.

Of these first famous anesthetics, only nitrous oxide is still widely used today, with chloroform and ether having been replaced by safer but sometimes more expensive general anesthetics, and cocaine by more effective local anesthetics with less abuse potential.

== Society and culture ==
Almost all healthcare providers use anesthetic drugs to some degree, but most health professions have their own field of specialists in the field including medicine, nursing and dentistry.

Doctors specializing in anesthesiology, including perioperative care, development of an anesthetic plan, and the administration of anesthetics are known in the US as anesthesiologists and in the UK, Canada, Australia, and NZ as anaesthetists or anaesthesiologists. All anesthetics in the UK, Australia, New Zealand, Hong Kong and Japan are administered by doctors. Nurse anesthetists also administer anesthesia in 109 nations. In the US, 35% of anesthetics are provided by physicians in solo practice, about 55% are provided by anesthesia care teams (ACTs) with anesthesiologists medically directing certified registered nurse anesthetists (CRNAs) or anesthesiologist assistants, and about 10% are provided by CRNAs in solo practice. There can also be anesthesiologist assistants (US) or physicians' assistants (anaesthesia) (UK) who assist with anesthesia.

== Special populations ==
There are many circumstances when anesthesia needs to be altered for special circumstances due to the procedure (such as in cardiac surgery, cardiothoracic anesthesiology or neurosurgery), the patient (such as in pediatric anesthesia, geriatric, bariatric or obstetrical anesthesia) or special circumstances (such as in trauma, prehospital care, robotic surgery or extreme environments).

== See also ==
- Biomaterial
- Cardiac surgery
- Dart gun, often used to deliver anesthesia
- Endoscopy
- Fluorescence image-guided surgery
- Hypnosurgery
- Jet ventilation
- List of surgical procedures
- Surgical drain
- Surgery
- Wooden chest – a post opioid anesthesia condition
