= Perioperative period =

Period between preparation for surgery and resolution of its sequelae

The perioperative period is a period of a patient's surgical procedure. The period may include the three phases of surgery (preoperative, intraoperative, and postoperative), though it is a term most often used for the first and third of these only. It commonly includes ward admission, anesthesia, surgery, and recovery. Perioperative care is the care that is given before and after surgery. The primary concern of perioperative care is to provide better conditions for patients before an operation (sometimes construed as during operation) and after an operation.

== Perioperative care ==
The perioperative period is a period of a patient's surgical procedure. It commonly includes ward admission, anesthesia, surgery, and recovery. Perioperative may refer to the three phases of surgery: preoperative, intraoperative, and postoperative. More commonly, the term is used for the first and third of these only, as a term which is often specifically utilized to imply around the time of the surgery.

Perioperative care is the care that is given before and after surgery. The primary concern of perioperative care is to provide better conditions for patients before an operation (sometimes construed as during operation) and after an operation. The care takes place in hospitals, in surgical centers attached to hospitals, in freestanding surgical centers, or health care providers' offices.

Findings from a systematic review of perioperative advance care planning suggest the importance and value that various types of decision aids have for patients to clarify their goals and specify others who can make decisions for them in case of unexpected surgical difficulties.

== Phases ==
=== Preoperative ===
The preoperative phase is used to perform surgical clearance, attempt to limit preoperational anxiety, and may include the preoperative fasting. This period prepares the patient both physically and psychologically for the surgical procedure and after surgery. For emergency surgeries, this period can be short and the patient may be oblivious to this; for elective surgeries preops, as they are called, can be quite lengthy due to a multitude of factors, including surgical clearance. Information obtained during preoperative assessment is used to create a care plan for the patient.

=== Intraoperative ===
The intraoperative period begins when the patient is transferred to the operating room table and ends with the transfer of a patient to the post-anesthesia care unit (PACU). During this period the patient is monitored, anesthetized, prepped, and draped, and the operation is performed. Nursing activities during this period focus on safety, infection prevention, opening additional sterile supplies to the field if needed and documenting applicable segments of the intraoperative report in the patients electronic health record. Intraoperative radiation therapy and intraoperative blood salvage may also be performed during this time.

=== Postoperative ===
The postoperative period begins after the transfer to the PACU and terminates with the resolution of the surgical sequelae. It is quite common for the last of this period to end outside of the care of the surgical team. It is uncommon to provide extended care past the discharge of the patient from the PACU. When stable at PACU, the patient is usually admitted to the surgical ward for continued postoperative care and recovery. Postoperative recovery is commonly used as a concept and can mean different things in different contexts and to different actors such as healthcare professionals and patients. Postoperative recovery is an energy-requiring complex process of returning to normality and wholeness that starts immediately after surgery and continues long after discharge. For patients recovery includes different turning points such as regaining independence and control over physical, psychological, social, and habitual functions and well-being.

== See also ==
- Pre-anesthesia checkup
