= Jerrold Levy =

American critical care physician and cardiac anesthesiologist

Jerrold H. Levy, MD, FAHA, FCCM
- Born: Miami, Florida, U.S.
- Education: Undergraduate: University of Michigan; Medical School: University of Miami; Internship: Jackson Memorial Hospital; Anesthesiology Residency: Massachusetts General Hospital; Cardiac Anesthesiology Fellowship: Massachusetts General Hospital; Critical Care Fellowship: Massachusetts General Hospital
- Medical career
- Profession: Cardiothoracic anesthesiology Intensive care medicine
- Institutions: Emory University Hospital; Duke University Health System
- Research: Hematology; Coagulation; Anaphylaxis

Jerrold H. Levy is an American critical care physician and cardiac anesthesiologist at Duke University Medical Center who currently serves as the co-director of Duke's Cardiothoracic Intensive Care Unit. He is most noted for his research in surgical hemostasis, coagulopathy in the critically ill, shock, anaphylaxis, and developing purified and recombinant therapeutic approaches to treat bleeding. He has authored over 400 publications, including scientific manuscripts, review articles, editorials, books, and book chapters. Additionally, he has authored a number of websites aimed at providing medical information to healthcare professionals through his website, DocMD.

He has been an active member on several national committees through his involvement in the American Heart Association, International Society of Thrombosis and Haemostasis (ISTH), and American Society of Anesthesiologists. He has served on the board of directors for the Society of Cardiovascular Anesthesiologists, and is currently on the board of directors for the Foundation for the Advancement of Cardiothoracic Surgical Care. He currently is an Executive Editor at Anesthesiology and serves as co-chair for the ISTH Scientific and Standardization Committee on Perioperative Thrombosis and Hemostasis.

== Training and education ==
Jerrold Levy's original career goal was to become a research scientist. He worked in a biochemistry lab as an undergraduate when his mentor recommended that he pursue a career in medicine. He went on to complete medical school at the University of Miami School of Medicine, completed an internship in internal medicine at Jackson Memorial Hospital, and trained in anesthesiology at Massachusetts General Hospital in Boston. Following residency, he sub-specialized in Cardiothoracic Anesthesiology and Critical Care Medicine at the Massachusetts General Hospital.

== Emory University ==
Dr. Levy served as deputy chair for Research and Director of Cardiothoracic Anesthesiology at Emory University in Atlanta, where he also had a coagulation research laboratory. During his time at Emory, he also served on the Blood Transfusion Committee, the Human Investigations Committee, the Research Committee, and the Clinical Investigator's Advisory Council. He was actively involved in medical education and career development, serving on the Medical Student Education Committee, the Residency Evaluation Committee, and the Faculty Workshop Development Committee.

== Duke University ==
In 2013, Levy began working at Duke University with dual appointments as Professor of Anesthesiology and associate professor of surgery in 2013. In addition to his role as the co-director of the cardiothoracic surgical intensive care unit, he also serves on the Transfusion Committee, Senior Research Council, and Cardiac Safety Research Consortium.

== Honors and awards ==
- 1969– Harvard Prize Book Award
- 1970 - American Legion Award
- 1970 - Order of the Silver Knight, Miami Herald
- 1970 - Florida Reagent Scholar
- 1973 - Elsa U. Pardee Student Research Fellowship, University of Michigan
- 1974 - James A Angel Scholar, University of Michigan
- 1975 - American Cancer Society Student Research Fellowship
- 1981 - M. Jasinska Anesthesia Award, Massachusetts General Hospitals
- 1985 - 3M New Investigator Award
- 2007 - Fellowship of the American Heart Association
- 2013 - Fellowship of the Society of Critical Care Medicine
