= Preanesthetic assessment =

Medical evaluation

Preanesthetic assessment (also called preanesthesia evaluation or pre-op evaluation) is a final medical evaluation conducted by an anesthesia provider before a surgery or medical procedure to ensure anesthesia can be administered safely. The anesthesia team (Anesthesiologists, Certified Registered Nurse Anesthetists or Certified Anesthesia Assistants) reviews the patient’s medical history, medications, past anesthesia experiences and obtains consent. A personal interview is usually conducted with the patient by the anesthesia provider to verify medical history details and address any questions or concerns. The anesthetic plan is then tailored to maximize the patient's safety. Finally, the patient must sign an informed consent form acknowledging they were informed of risks of anesthesia.

== Medical history review ==
A review of the medical chart helps identify any risk factors that could impact anesthesia, including:

- Pacemakers or bleeding disorders: These conditions may influence anesthesia choices.
- Higher risk of nausea: Postoperative nausea and vomiting (PONV) is more common in female patients, particularly younger individuals.
- Past anesthesia complications: Difficulty with intubation or excessive nausea after previous surgeries should be noted.

== Patient interview ==
A face-to-face discussion with the anesthesia provider helps ensure all necessary precautions are taken.

- Addressing Anxiety: Providing information about the procedure can help ease concerns.
- Discussing Anesthesia Options: Determining whether general or regional anesthesia is most appropriate with the patient's preferences in mind.
- Jewelry or Piercings: Removal is often required to prevent complications. A metal piercing could cause a severe burn if electrocautery is used during surgery.
- Uncontrolled Medical Conditions: Uncontrolled blood sugar or blood pressure may need management before the surgical case.
- Religious Considerations: Some patients, such as Jehovah’s Witnesses, may decline blood transfusions, and this should be clarified with the anesthesia provider. Those of the Muslim faith may have specific requests in terms of physical contact.
- Eating or Drinking Before Surgery: Failure to follow NPO (nothing by mouth) guidelines may postpone surgery for safety reasons. Anesthesia medications can temporarily impair the muscles responsible for keeping food and liquids in the stomach. Consuming food or liquids beyond the instructed time can significantly increase the risk of aspiration (stomach contents entering the lungs), which can lead to serious complications, including the need for intensive care. Normal muscle function returns once anesthesia has worn off, and the patient is transferred to the post-anesthesia recovery unit.
- Confirming the Surgical Plan: An extra safety measure to verify all necessary details.

Medications:

- Diabetes: Adjustments to insulin or other medications may be necessary. Certain drugs, such as GLP-1 and SGLT2 inhibitors, may require special instructions. These medications can prevent the stomach from emptying out normally, seriously increasing the risk of choking on stomach contents when a breathing tube is inserted and removed.
- Blood Thinners: Medications like aspirin or warfarin may need to be paused before surgery.
- Herbal Supplements: Some natural remedies can affect blood clotting or interact with anesthesia.
- Seizure Medications: Certain epilepsy drugs are sometimes held before surgery, depending on the procedure.

== Physical exam ==
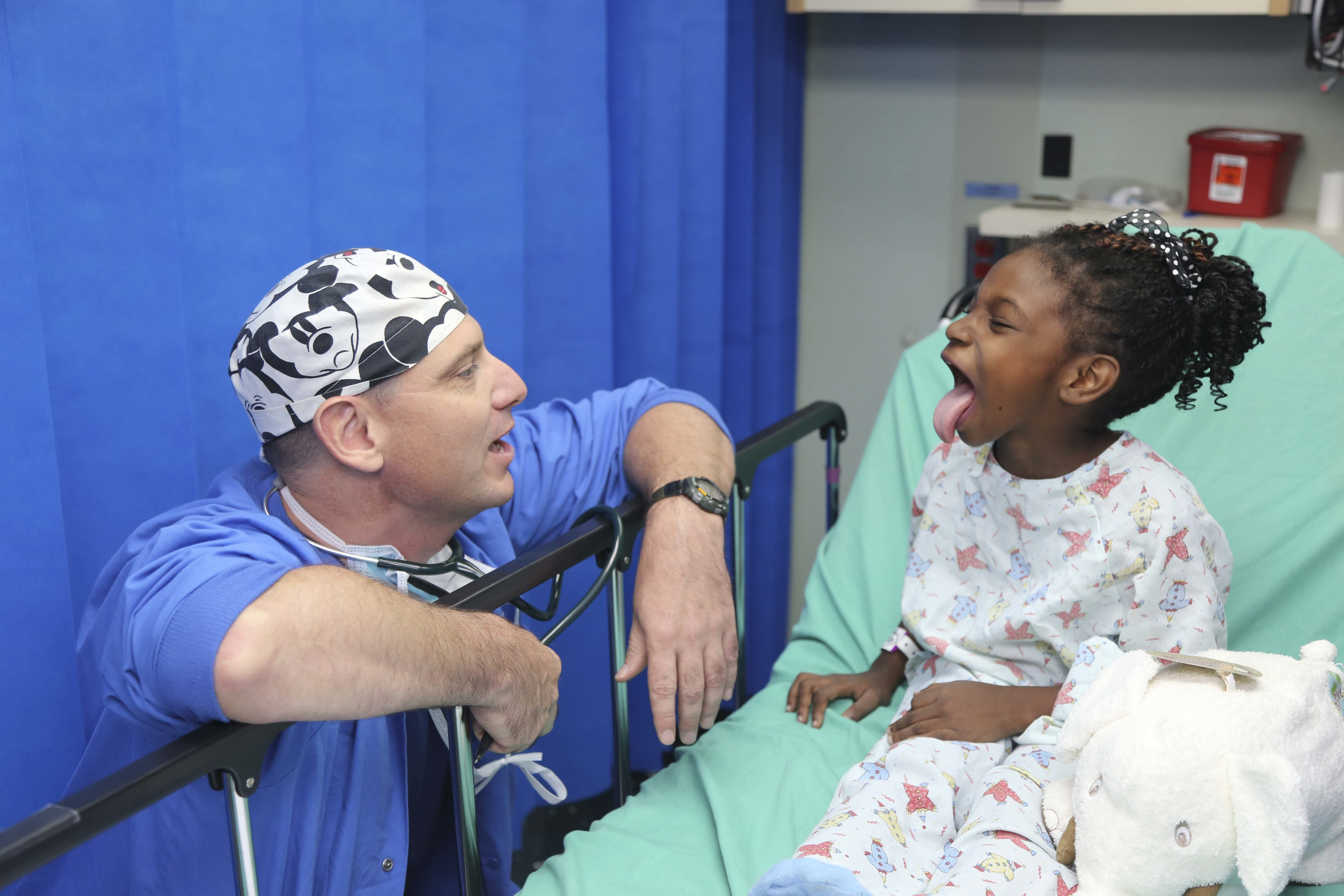
- Airway Assessment
  Airway Evaluation: The anesthesia provider may use the Mallampati score or other tools to predict potential intubation difficulties. This occurs when the anesthesia provider asks patients to open their mouths widely for inspection. They may also ask the patient to turn their head side to side or to look up at the ceiling.
- Lung Health: Conditions such as asthma, sleep apnea, or smoking history can impact breathing under anesthesia. Frequently, a preoperative chest x-ray is performed to ensure readiness for possible ventilatory support during surgery.
- Heart Health: Surgery can be considered to be as stressful as walking up 1-2 flights of stairs. The inability to tolerate such exertion may require modifications to the anesthetic plan. Sometimes, a 12-lead EKG may be necessary to ensure a patient's heart is ready. In select cases a more in-depth test called a transthoracic echocardiogram (ultrasound of the heart) is also performed.
- Physical Limitations and Frailty: Issues with mobility, stiff joints, or other conditions may affect positioning during surgery. These challenges tend to be more common for the elderly who require up to four times the number of surgical procedures.

== Intravenous access ==
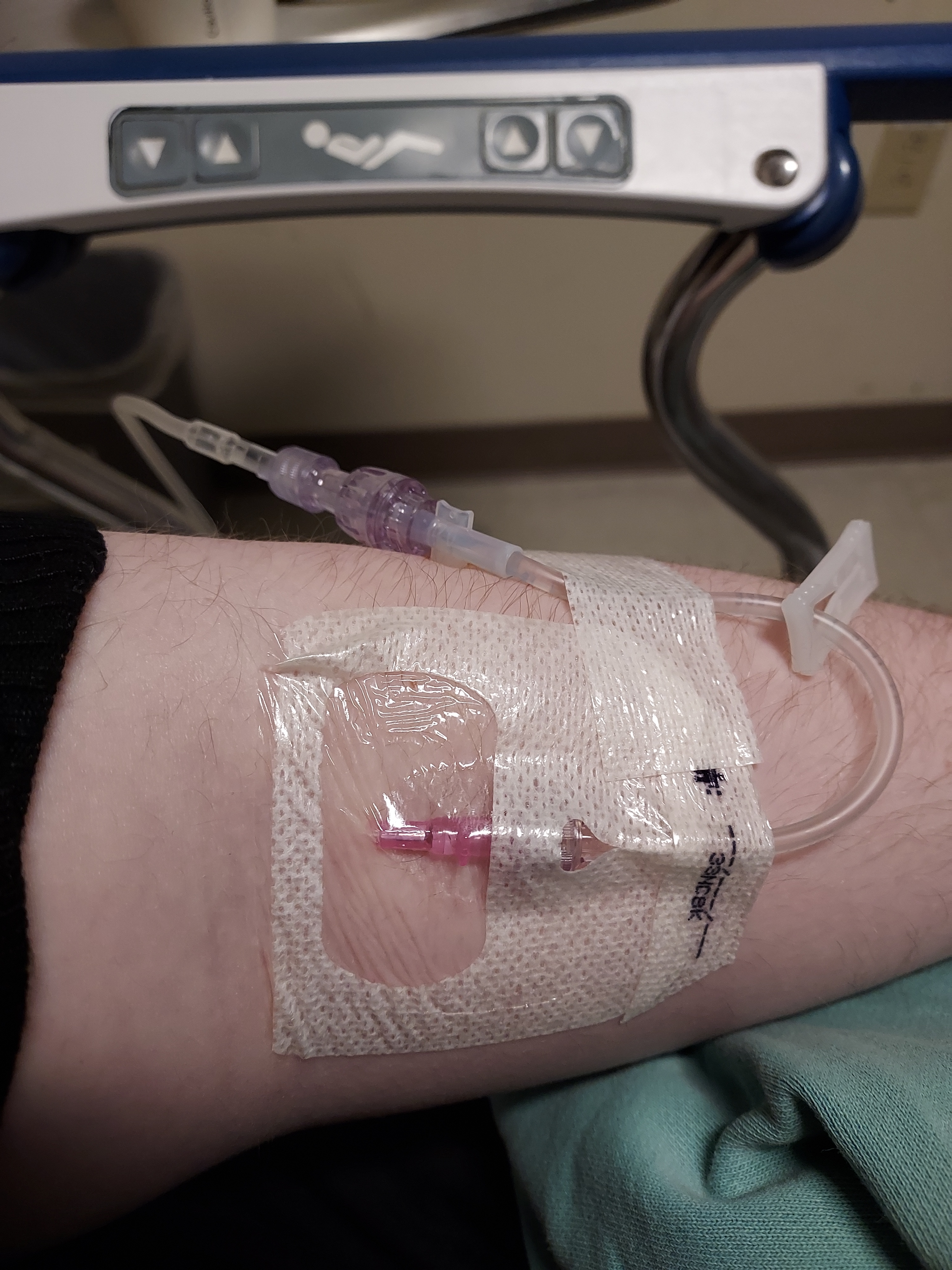
An Intravenous Catheter (IV) ready for surgery

Before a patient is taken to the operating room, an anesthesia provider verifies the number and size of intravenous (IV) catheters required for the procedure. IV access is essential for administering fluids, medications, and life-saving blood products. In many cases, two IV catheters are placed as a precaution in case one fails during the procedure. Larger-bore IVs may be necessary to accommodate high-volume fluid administration. For patients with allergies to inhaled anesthetics, anesthesia can sometimes be administered exclusively through an IV. In cases where IV access is challenging due to patient-specific factors, ultrasound guidance may be used to facilitate catheter placement.

== Consent for anesthesia ==
There are many details to be covered before anesthesia is provided. The information covered and how depends on the needs of the patient. If available, the anesthetist may offer different options for pain control during and after surgery. Adverse effects of anesthesia and need for possible admission to the intensive care unit (ICU) are discussed. Patients have the opportunity to ask questions and make decisions to guide their care.

== Anesthesia students ==
A mnemonic has been suggested for pre-anesthetic assessment, to ensure that all aspects are covered. It runs alphabetically:

A – Affirmative history; Airway
B – Blood hemoglobin, blood loss estimation, and blood availability; Breathing
C – Clinical examination; Co-morbidities
D – Drugs being used by the patient; Details of previous anesthesia and surgeries
E – Evaluate investigations; End point to take up the case for surgery
F – Fluid status; Fasting
G – Give physical status; Get consent
