= Twilight anesthesia =

Anesthetic technique

Patient and doctor describing state of consciousness similar to "twilight anesthesia"

Twilight anesthesia is an anesthetic technique where a mild dose of sedation is applied to induce anxiolysis (anxiety relief), hypnosis, and anterograde amnesia (inability to form new memories). The patient is not unconscious, but sedated. During surgery or other medical procedures, the patient is under what is known as a "twilight state", where the patient is relaxed and "sleepy", able to follow simple directions by the doctor, and is responsive.

Generally, twilight anesthesia causes the patient to forget the surgery and the time right after. It is used for a variety of surgical procedures and for various reasons. Like regular anesthesia, twilight anesthesia is designed to help a patient feel more comfortable and to minimize pain associated with the procedure being performed and to allow the medical practitioner to practice without interruptions.

== Overview ==
Twilight anesthesia is also known as twilight sleep and allows an easy awakening and a speedy recovery time for the patient. Anesthesia is used to control pain by using medicines that reversibly block nerve conduction near the site of administration, therefore, generating a loss of sensation at the area administered. Close monitoring by the anesthesia provider will sometimes be provided, to help keep the patient comfortable during a medical procedure, along with other drugs to help relax the body. It can also help control breathing, blood pressure, blood flow, and heart rate and rhythm, when needed.

There are four levels of sedation by anesthesia.

=== Level one ===
This level, called minimal sedation, causes anxiolysis, a drug-induced state in which the patient responds normally to verbal commands. Although the cognition and coordination of the patient are impaired, cardiovascular and ventilatory functions remain unaffected.

=== Level two ===
This level, called moderate sedation/analgesia or conscious sedation, causes a drug induced depression of consciousness during which the patient responds purposefully to verbal commands, either alone or accompanied with light physical stimulation. Breathing tubes are not required for this type of anesthesia. This is twilight anesthesia.

=== Level three ===
This level, called deep sedation/analgesia, causes a drug-induced depression of consciousness during which the patient cannot be easily aroused, but responds purposefully following repeated or painful stimulation. Ventilatory functions may be impaired, so breathing tubes are required. Cardiovascular functions are usually sustained.

=== Level four ===
This level, called general anesthesia, causes a drug-induced depression of consciousness during which the patient cannot be aroused even by painful stimulation. Ventilatory function is often impaired and cardiovascular functions may be impaired.

== Applications ==
Several factors are taken into consideration when determining which level of anesthesia is used under which type of medical procedures. Along with the factors determined, different types of anesthesia medications are used depending on the medical procedure being done. While the patient is under conscious sedation by anesthesia, depending on the type and dose administered, they are in a state that is called by some, a "twilight" state.

== Drugs and technology used ==
Some of the same drugs used in general anesthesia are also used for twilight anesthesia, except in smaller doses and in a bolus interval (a concentrated mass of a substance administered intravenously for diagnostic or therapeutic purposes). These drugs can be administered via gases, such as nitrous oxide (laughing gas), or intravenously, with drugs such as ketamine (pediatrics primarily, and infrequently in adults), propofol, and midazolam. Twilight anesthesia alone is not used to provide relief from surgical pain; therefore, it is always given in conjunction with a local or regional anesthetic. Additionally, IV sedation is frequently administered as a concoction of several agents including those previously mentioned for induction and maintenance of anesthesia, as well as a benzodiazepine (usually midazolam, but temazepam or flunitrazepam are also used via the oral route) and a narcotic/systemic analgesic such as demerol or fentanyl. As discussed in the levels of sedation by anesthesia, assistance with breathing tubes (ETT or LMA) is not generally used for this type of anesthesia.

== Effects ==
A few studies have been geared towards studying the effects of post operative analgesic regimes which measure the quality of recovery period and health-related quality of life. Factors other than degree of analgesia and presence of analgesic agent-related side effects (e.g., fatigue, physical functioning, and mental health) may potentially influence these outcomes. Twilight anesthesia offers a limited recovery period after procedures, and is usually associated with less nausea and vomiting than general anesthesia which makes it a popular choice among doctors who are performing procedures such as minor plastic surgeries.

== Uses ==
Twilight anesthesia is applied to various types of medical procedures and surgeries. It is a popular choice among surgeons and doctors who are performing anything from minor plastic surgeries to dental work, and procedures that do not require extensive operations or long durations in favor of less nausea and a limited recovery period after surgery.

- Ambulatory surgical centers
- Cosmetic surgeons
- Dentists
- Dermatologists
- Emergency Physicians
- Endodontists
- ENT surgeons
- General surgeons
- Gastroenterology
- Gynecologists
- MRI centers
- Neurologists
- Neurosurgeons
- Ophthalmologists
- Oral surgeons
- Orthopedic surgeons
- Pediatric dentists
- Periodontists
- Plastic surgeons
- Podiatrists/foot surgeons
- Psychiatrists
- Radiologists
- Rheumatologists
- Urologists
