= Cardiothoracic anesthesiology =

Medical subspeciality

Cardiothoracic anesthesiology is a subspeciality of the medical practice of anesthesiology, devoted to the preoperative, intraoperative, and postoperative care of adult and pediatric patients undergoing cardiothoracic surgery and related invasive procedures.

It deals with the anesthesia aspects of care related to surgical cases such as open heart surgery, lung surgery, and other operations of the human chest. These aspects include perioperative care with expert manipulation of patient cardiopulmonary physiology through precise and advanced application of pharmacology, resuscitative techniques, critical care medicine, and invasive procedures. This also includes management of the cardiopulmonary bypass (heart-lung) machine, which most cardiac procedures require intraoperatively while the heart undergoes surgical correction.

== Cardiothoracic Anesthesiology Fellowship (U.S.) ==
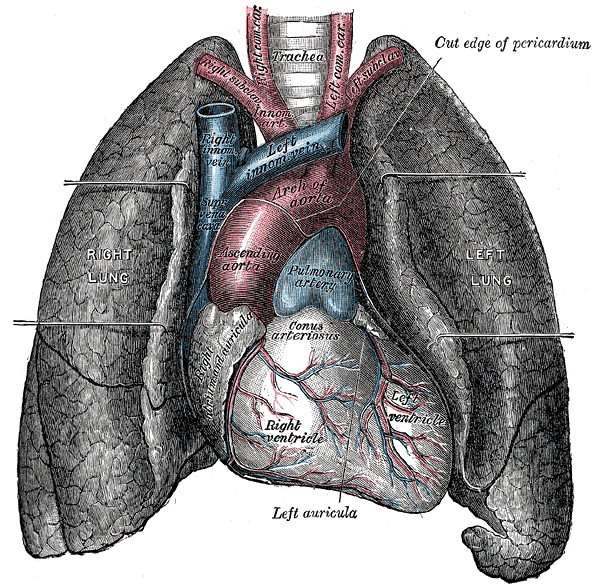

All anesthesiologists obtain either a Doctor of Medicine (MD) or Doctor of Osteopathic Medicine (DO) degree prior to entering post-medical school graduate medical education. After satisfactory completion of an Accreditation Council for Graduate Medical Education (ACGME) or American Osteopathic Association (AOA) accredited one year internship in either internal medicine or surgery and a three-year residency program in all subspecialties of anesthesiology, formal advanced training in Cardiothoracic Anesthesiology is available via a one-year fellowship.Cardiothoracic Anesthesia Fellowship - Department of Anesthesiology - Miller School of Medicine at the University of Miami Society of Cardiovascular Anesthesiologists.

The first Cardiothoracic Anesthesiology fellowship was formed at Harvard Medical School and the Massachusetts General Hospital in 1971. Massachusetts General Hospital Department of Anesthesia, Critical Care and Pain Medicine - Fellowships Since then, Cardiothoracic Anesthesiology has become an ACGME approved fellowship (2007), and there are 64 ACGME accredited programs and 212 match positions for the 2017-2018 application year.

This fellowship consists of at least eight months of adult Cardiothoracic Anesthesiology, one month dedicated to transesophageal echocardiography, one month in cardiothoracic intensive care unit and two months of elective rotation which includes inpatient or outpatient cardiology or pulmonary medicine, invasive cardiology, medical or surgical critical care and extracorporeal perfusion technology.

Fellows are offered the opportunity to participate in clinical research and encouraged to present at national or international conferences after completion of a research project. The arenas of research can be as diverse as neuroprotection, myocardial protection, blood conservation strategies, and port access surgery.

=== Cardiac surgical training ===
Fellows are trained to provide perioperative anesthetic management for patients with severe cardiopulmonary pathology. Some of the cardiac surgeries they train for include the following: coronary artery bypass surgery (CABG) both on cardiopulmonary bypass as well as on a beating heart, heart valve surgery, aortic reconstruction requiring deep hypothermic arrest, mechanical ventricular assist device (VAD) placement, thoracic aortic aneurysm repair, aortic dissection repair, heart transplants, lung transplants, heart/lung transplants, and adult congenital heart surgery.

Adequate exposure and experience provided in the management of adult patients for cardiac pacemaker and automatic implantable cardiac defibrillator placement, surgical treatment of cardiac arrhythmias, and the complete gamut of invasive cardiologic (catheter-based) and electrophysiological procedures is expected as well.

Fellows also gain experience in perioperative medical (anesthetic) management of the cardiac patient, including management of intra-aortic balloon pumps (IABP) and ventricular assist devices (VAD), post-operative ICU care, blood transfusion medicine, electrophysiology, and transthoracic echocardiography. Massachusetts General Hospital Department of Anesthesia, Critical Care and Pain Medicine - Fellowships

Many fellowships also offer opportunity to become familiar with anesthetic techniques for pediatric cardiac surgery and minimally invasive cardiac surgery, however no formal case numbers for ACGME accreditation are required.

=== Thoracic surgical training ===
In addition to the focused cardiac training, additional clinical experience within the full one-year fellowship includes anesthetic management of adult patients undergoing thoracic and vascular surgery. Fellows are trained to manage all type of thoracic surgeries which include video-assisted thoracoscopic surgery (VATS), open thoracotomy, and advanced airway procedures involving the trachea. Fellows achieve expertise in different techniques of lung isolation and ventilation including double-lumen endotracheal tubes, bronchial blockers, Univent tubes under guidance of fiber optic bronchoscopy, and advanced jet ventilation.

=== Advanced monitoring and invasive techniques ===
The complex nature of cardiothoracic surgery necessitates extra training to acquire the skills needed to be a cardiothoracic anesthesiology consultant. Fellows are trained to achieve expertise in the advanced monitoring techniques including invasive blood pressure, arterial blood gas analysis, cardiac output monitoring, jugular venous oxygen saturation, cerebral oximetry, Bispectral Index (BIS), Transcranial doppler (TCD), and Near infrared spectroscopy (NIRS).

Finally, invasive procedures completed by the cardiothoracic anesthesiology fellows include but are not limited to arterial line placement (femoral, axillary, brachial, radial), central venous cannulation (internal jugular, femoral, subclavian), pulmonary artery catheter placement, transvenous pacemaker placement, thoracic epidural analgesia, fiberoptic endotracheal tube placement, 2D/3D transesophageal echocardiography, intraspinal drainage placement, and advanced ultrasound guidance of vascular access.

== Echocardiography (TTE and TEE) ==
CVT anesthesologist at work in University of Miami

Echocardiography produces a real-time image of the heart via ultrasound imaging, and can be performed in two or three dimensions. There are two ways of performing echocardiography depending on placement of echocardiography probe: transthoracic or transesophageal.

In transthoracic echocardiography (TTE), the probe is placed over the patient's chest wall, while in transesophageal echocardiography (TEE or TOE in the UK), the probe is placed into the esophagus.

Regardless of technique, each probe contains a transducer. While transmitting signals, it converts electrical energy to acoustic energy. When receiving signals, it converts acoustic energy to electrical energy, which is processed by the machine to form an image. Various techniques are employed to manipulate the data, including Doppler imaging.

Transesophageal echocardiography has rapidly become the most powerful monitoring technique and diagnostic tool for the management of cardiac surgical patients, primarily due to the transesophageal echocardiogram probe location and ability to be used intraoperatively. It provides the detailed information about the structure and function of the heart/great vessels in real time, allowing the cardiothoracic anesthesiologist to precisely manage patient physiology while providing updates and direction to members of the surgical team throughout the pre, intra, and post operative time frame of patient care.

After successful completion of the fellowship with subspecialty training in TEE, cardiothoracic anesthesiology fellows may sit for examination leading to board certification in echocardiography. The examination, also known as the Advanced PTEeXAM, is administered by the National Board of Echocardiography (NBE). National Board of Echocardiography - PTEeXAM. In addition to passing the test, fellows can become board certified only after performing 150 exams as well as reviewing an additional 150 exams with a board certified cardiologist/cardiothoracic anesthesiologist.

== Cardio-pulmonary bypass ==
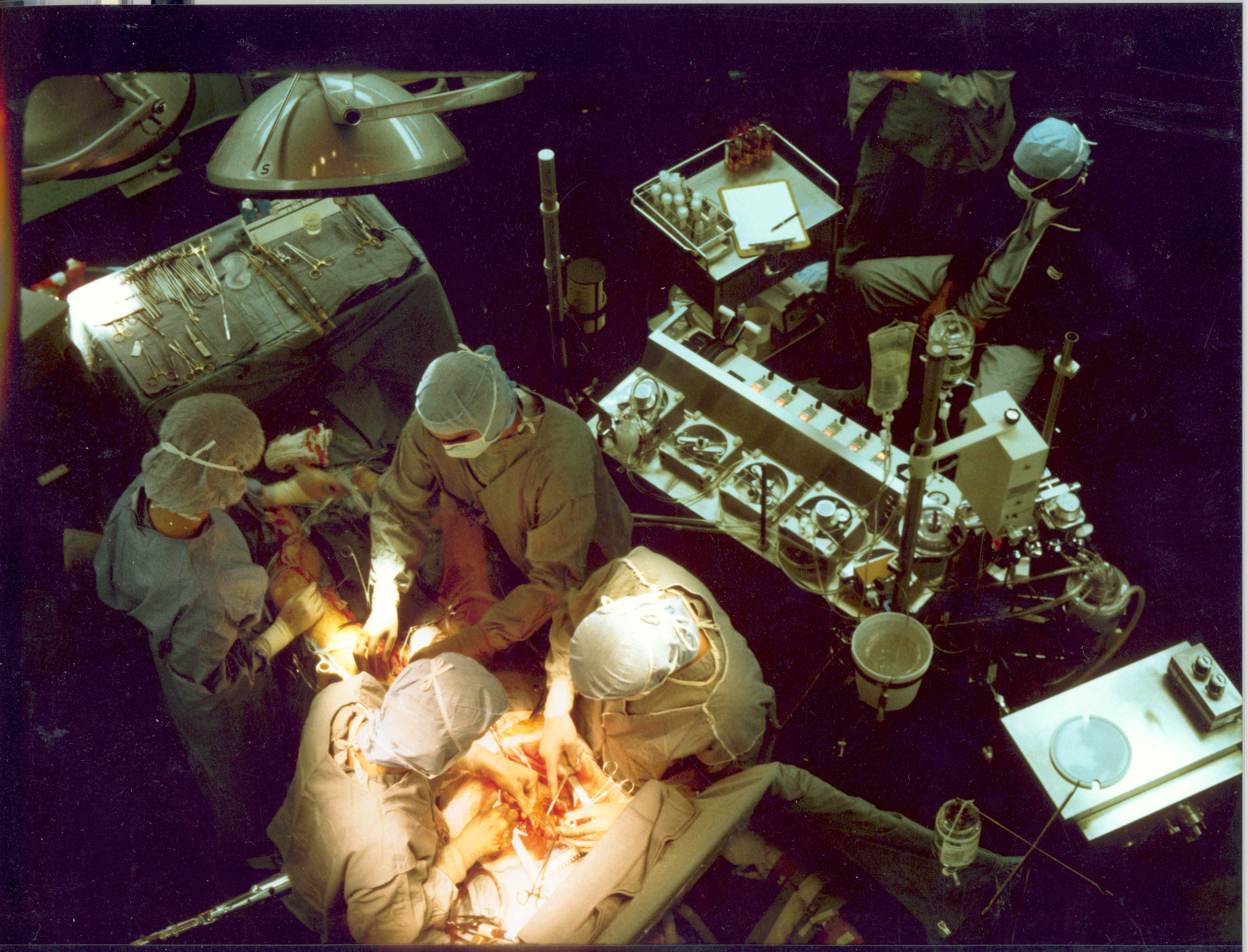
CABG surgery with CPB

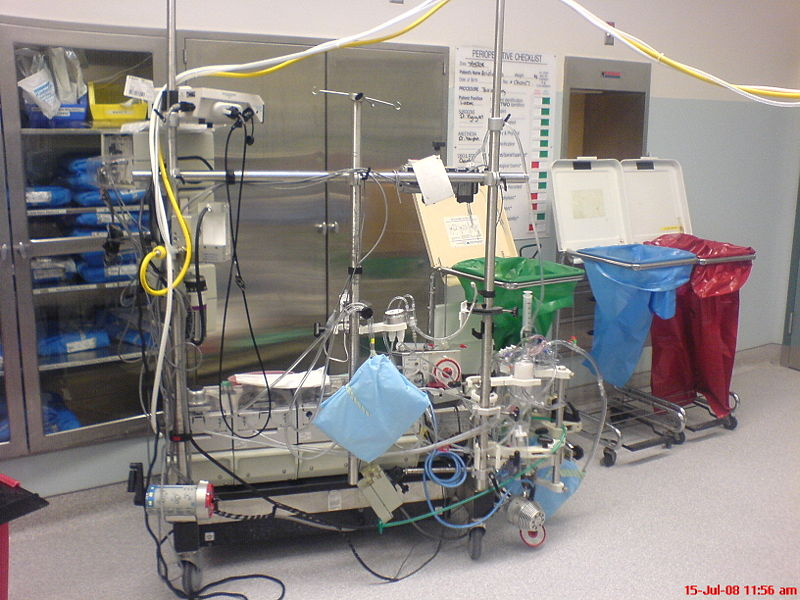
Assembled CPB circuit ready to use

Cardiopulmonary bypass (CPB) is a technique in which heart-lung machine temporarily takes over the function of the heart and lungs during surgery. The CPB is operated by the perfusionist. During the heart operation, the perfusionist takes over the heart function. The perfusionist works in close relation with the anesthesiologist and the surgeon.

Blood is drained from the venous (deoxygenated) circulation, and is cycled through the CPB machine. While in the machine, the blood is filtered, heated or cooled, and infused with oxygen. Subsequently, it is pumped back into the arterial (oxygenated) circulation, thereby bypassing the heart and lungs and maintaining the perfusion of the vital organs.

While the step by step process for preparation and initiation of CPB can vary between institution and type of surgery, a typical scenario is as follows.

After a median sternotomy, a surgical retractor is placed by the surgeon to optimize exposure of the heart. At this time, heparin is given to thin the blood to prevent thrombus from forming while on CPB. The surgeon places a cannula in the right atrium, vena cava, or femoral vein to withdraw blood from the venous circulation. The perfusionist uses gravity to drain the venous blood into the CPB machine, and a separate cannula, usually placed in the aorta or femoral artery, is used to return blood to the arterial circulation.

The process of preparation, initiation, and separation of cardiopulmonary bypass is a critical time during cardiac surgery. Some studies have even considered formalizing this period of time, much like the "sterile cockpit" process in critical steps of aviation Is the "sterile cockpit" concept applicable to cardiovascular surgery critical intervals or critical events? The impact of protocol-driven communication during cardiopulmonary bypass. The communication, while a team effort, is led and directed by the cardiothoracic anesthesiologist, as the surgeon is focused on acquiring and maintaining adequate exposure. This can even extend to placement of the cannulae for CPB preparation, as the cardiothoracic anesthesiologist often directs the surgical placement via real-time TEE data. As such, this responsibility demands that the cardiothoracic anesthesiologist have a thorough knowledge of the advanced physiology, principles, practical application and management of CPB.

After completion of the "on bypass" surgical correction, preparations are made to separate the patient from CPB. In other words, the heart and lung are prepared to receive, oxygenate, and pump the blood which had immediately previous been done by the CPB machine. Separation can be complicated by the CPB machine, the patient's inherent pathology/physiology, surgical correction, and the dynamic interaction of all three. Cardiopulmonary bypass has effects on the patient's hematology, physiology, and immunology, which must be acutely managed by the cardiothoracic anesthesiologist in order to ensure effective separation from CPB.

== Role of cardiothoracic anesthesiologists in non-cardiac surgery ==
Cardiac Anesthesiologists performing diagnostic intraoperative TEE in a case of sudden cardiac arrest during hysterectomy

Patients with cardiothoracic pathology who present for non-cardiothoracic surgery are at increased risk for serious perioperative complications. Cardiothoracic anesthesiologists are often consulted by their colleagues to provide expert management during intraoperative hemodynamic instability or cardiac arrest by evaluating heart function with the aid of TEE and placement of other invasive advanced hemodynamic monitors, such as pacing swans.
