= Preoperative care =

Health care provided before a surgical operation

Preoperative care refers to health care provided before a surgical operation. Preoperative care aims to do whatever is right to increase the success of the surgery.

At some point before the operation, the healthcare provider will assess the fitness of the person to have surgery. This assessment should include whatever tests are indicated (e.g., to check the blood pressure or for signs of sepsis), but not include screening for conditions without an indication (e.g., to check for high cholesterol).

Immediately before surgery the person's body is prepared, perhaps by washing with an antiseptic, and if needed, their anxiety is addressed to make them comfortable.

== Technique ==
At some point before surgery a health care provider conducts a preoperative assessment to verify that a person is fit and ready for the surgery. For surgeries in which a person receives either general or local anesthesia, this assessment may be done either by a doctor or a nurse trained to do the assessment. The available research does not give insight about any differences in outcomes depending on whether a doctor or nurse conducts this assessment.

=== Addressing anxiety ===
Playing calming music to patients immediately before surgery has a beneficial effect in addressing anxiety about the surgery.

=== Surgical site preparation ===
Hair removal at the location where the surgical incision is made is often done before the surgery. Sufficient evidence does not exist to say that removing hair is a useful way to prevent infections. When it is done immediately before surgery, the use of hair clippers might be preferable to shaving.

Bathing with an antiseptic like chlorhexidine does not seem to affect incidence of complications after surgery. However, washing the surgical site with chlorhexidine after surgery does seem helpful for preventing surgical site infection. However, preoperative skin preparation with iodine povacrylex in isopropyl alcohol has been associated with a lower 90-day surgical site infection rate than chlorhexidine gluconate in isopropyl alcohol for some adults surgeries to repair closed fractures of the lower extremity or pelvis.

== Risks ==
Screening is a test to see whether a person has a disease, and screenings are often done before surgery. Screenings should happen when they are indicated and not otherwise as a matter of routine. Screenings which are done without indication carry the risks of having unnecessary health care.

Commonly overused screenings include the following:

- Electrocardiograms (ECGs) are sometimes given before any kind of surgery as a matter of routine, but are unnecessary if a person does not have new and worrisome symptoms and if the surgery is minor. Eye surgery, for example, would not usually require an ECG.
- Cardiac imaging and cardiac stress tests are usually unnecessary for people who do not have a serious heart condition and who are having surgery unrelated to the heart. People in the United States using government healthcare services are especially likely to have this procedure without indication.
- Chest x-rays are usually unnecessary for people under age 70 who are not having chest surgery and who do not have worrisome symptoms.
- Breathing tests are usually unnecessary for people who do not smoke, do not have respiratory disease, and who do not have symptoms.
- Carotid ultrasonography is usually unnecessary for people who have not had a stroke or mini-stroke.
- Laboratory tests, including urinalysis, white blood count, and a pregnancy test.

== Clearance ==
Surgical clearance, or preoperative medical clearance, is an evaluation to determine if a patient is healthy enough to undergo a planned surgery. The primary objective of this evaluation is to identify any existing medical conditions or risk factors that may lead to complications during or after the surgery. This allows healthcare providers to take necessary precautions and optimize the patient's health before the operation. The purpose is to lower modifiable risk during and after the surgery along with estimating total risk of undertaking the procedure. Most importantly, the goal is to make sure that the person has sufficient circulation to survive the surgery. Especially for emergency surgery with suspected internal bleeding or other risk of hypovolemic shock, surgery may be delayed in an effort to increase blood pressure and improve oxygenation through methods such as IV fluids and supplemental oxygen. However, giving too much fluid can cause post-operative complications.

Standardized systems for evaluating pre-operative risks, such as the American College of Surgeons National Surgical Quality Improvement Program (NSQIP), are used for this process.

The amount of time that can be spent on this process depends heavily upon the circumstances. Sometimes surgery must be commenced immediately, or the patient will bleed to death. In other cases, more than a day can be spent preparing even for an urgent surgery. However, for most situations (e.g., a typical acute appendicitis or intestinal obstruction), no more than a few hours are needed.

== Special populations ==
=== Children ===
Among children who are at normal risk of pulmonary aspiration or vomiting during anaesthesia, there is no evidence showing that denying them oral liquids before surgery improves outcomes but there is evidence showing that giving liquids prevents anxiety.

=== Recreational substance users ===
Sometimes before a surgery a health care provider will recommend some health intervention to modify some risky behavior which is associated with complications from surgery.

Smoking cessation before surgery is likely to reduce the risk of complications from surgery.

In circumstances in which a person's doctor advises them to avoid drinking alcohol before and after the surgery, but in which the person seems likely to drink anyway, intense interventions which direct a person to quit using alcohol have been proven to be helpful in reducing complications from surgery.

== See also ==
- Prehabilitation
