= Surgical stress =

Systemic response to surgical injury

Surgical stress is the systemic response to surgical injury and is characterized by activation of the sympathetic nervous system, endocrine responses as well as immunological and haematological changes. Measurement of surgical stress is used in anaesthesia, physiology and surgery. Activation of the sympathetic nervous system caused by surgical stress is an integrated physiological, neuroendocrine, and inflammatory reaction to tissue injury from surgery. This in turn leads to hypermetabolism, catabolism, and immune system changes. Key elements include the release of catecholamines such as adrenaline, cortisol, and inflammatory cytokines (IL-1, IL-6, leading to increased risk of infection, muscle wasting, and potential organ damage and dysfunction. The impact on the body is triggered by afferent neural impulses to the hypothalamus which is correlated to the invasiveness of the procedure performed.

Analysis of the surgical stress response can be used for evaluation of surgical techniques and comparisons of different anaesthetic protocols. Moreover, they can be performed both in the intraoperative or postoperative period. If there is a choice between different techniques for a surgical procedure, one method to evaluate and compare the surgical techniques is to subject one group of patients to one technique, and the other group of patients to another technique, after which the surgical stress responses triggered by the procedures are compared. Absent any other difference, the technique with the least surgical stress response is considered the best for the patient.

Similarly, a group of patients can be subjected to a surgical procedure where one anaesthetic protocol is used, and another group of patients are subjected to the same surgical procedure but with a different anaesthetic protocol. The anaesthetic protocol that yields the least stress response is considered the most suitable for that surgical procedure.

It is generally considered or hypothesized that a more invasive surgery, with extensive tissue trauma and noxious stimuli, triggers a more significant stress response.

However, duration of surgery may affect the stress response which therefore may make comparisons of procedures that differ in time difficult.

== History ==
Loss of nitrogen (urea) was observed already in the 1930s in fracture patients by the Scottish physician David Cuthbertson. The reason for the patients' catabolic response was not understood at the time, but later attention was turned to the stress reaction caused by the surgery. The evolutionary background is believed to be that a wounded animal increases its chance of survival by using stored energy reserves. The stress reaction thus initiates a catabolic state by an increased release of catabolic hormones. Additionally immunosuppressive hormones are also released. In a surgery patient, the stress reaction is considered detrimental for wound healing. However, surgical stress reduced mortality from endotoxin shock. Today, development of new surgical techniques and anaesthetic protocols aim to minimise the surgical stress reaction.

== Physiology of surgical stress response ==
Surgical stress begins with tissue damage that leads to either a neurohormonal or immunologic response. Part of the neurohormonal response involves the release of catecholamines and the activation of the RAAS system while the other involves the cortisol released and a feedback mechanism on the HPA axis. Both can eventually lead to a specific immune response involving T Helper cells. The immunologic response is categorized as innate or specific – with the innate response releasing acute phase reactants and inflammatory markers such as TNF alpha, IL-1,6,8 CRP and fibrinogen. The main cells in the specific immune response include TH1, TH2, and, Cytotoxic and B cells.

=== Methods to monitor to the stress response ===
Examples of used parameters are blood pressure, heart rate, heart rate variability, photoplethysmography and skin conductance. Essentially, physiologic parameters are measured in order to assess sympathetic tone as a surrogate measure of stress. Intraoperative neurophysiological monitoring can also be used. Examples of commonly used biomarkers are adrenaline, cortisol, interleukins, noradrenaline and vasopressin.

== Modulators ==
Elements that affect the bodies post surgical stress response can be divided into physiological, pharmacological, and surgical.Enhanced recovery after surgery (ERAS) protocols have been found to improve post surgical outcomes by alleviating the surgical stress response. ERAS protocols include preoperative, perioperative and postoperative considerations. Preoperative considerations include expanding on patient knowledge through education, improving nutrition and managing the effects of comorbid conditions.Eating before surgery can trigger or amplify the body's stress response due to increased metabolic and digestive activity. Intraoperatively the use of specific analgesia, maintenance of temperature, are priority considerations. Lastly, postoperatively, patient return to normal feeding, out of bed protocols, and pain management aid in decreasing post surgical stress response and improve outcomes. Post operatively it is recommended that patients start early oral feedings to reduce the surgical stress by reestablishing metabolic control, decreasing stress related catabolism and increasing gastrointestinal function. The use of pharmacological such as beta blockers and alpha adrenergic receptors blockers preoperatively can help improve survival for patients.
