= Tumescent anesthesia =

Surgical technique for delivery of local anesthesia

Tumescent anesthesia is a surgical technique for delivery of local anesthesia. It also makes the target tissue firm and turgid from absorbed water, which can aid certain procedures. It was originally devised for use in liposuction, but has since been applied to other surgical situations, including plastic surgery, burn care, and vascular surgery. It is a relatively safe way to achieve extensive regional anesthesia of skin and subcutaneous tissue with a high total dose but a low risk of systemic toxicity. The subcutaneous infiltration of a large volume of very dilute lidocaine and epinephrine causes the targeted tissue to become swollen and firm, or tumescent, and permits otherwise painful procedures to be performed on patients without subjecting them to the inherent risks of general anesthesia, and with reduced blood loss due to the vasoconstriction induced by epinephrine.

== Agents and doses ==
The most common combination of agents used in tumescent anesthesia is lidocaine (0.05-0.10%) and epinephrine (1 ppm). For lidocaine, total doses of 35 mg/kg and 55 mg/kg have been reported as reasonably safe high-end doses, in the context of liposuction. Prilocaine is also widely used, although it is not formally approved for tumescent anesthesia in the USA. A combination of lidocaine/prilocaine has been used in radio frequency ablation of varicose veins, and has been suggested as appropriate for cases where a great volume of tumescent anesthesia is required. A double-blind randomized intraindividual study of lidocaine versus prilocaine in tumescent anesthesia for liposuction revealed no differences in efficacy or tolerability, except that lidocaine had a slightly more rapid onset of action. A clinician reported favorably on the use of ropivacaine for slow-infusion tumescent anesthesia, where ropivacaine provided local anesthesia for about twice as long as lidocaine. Bupivicaine is not recommended by the American Academy of Dermatology due to a lack of data on its use.
