= Preoperative fasting =

Fasting before a surgical procedure to reduce stomach content

Preoperative fasting is the practice of a surgical patient abstaining from eating or drinking ("nothing by mouth") for some time before having an operation. This is intended to prevent stomach contents from getting into the windpipe and lungs (known as a pulmonary aspiration) while the patient is under general anesthesia.

== Pulmonary aspiration ==
The main hypothesized benefit of preoperative fasting is to prevent pulmonary aspiration of stomach contents while under the effects of general anesthesia. Aspiration of as little as 30–40 mL can be a significant cause of suffering and death during an operation and therefore fasting is performed to reduce the volume of stomach contents as much as possible. Several factors can predispose to aspiration of stomach contents including inadequate anesthesia, pregnancy, obesity, difficult airways, emergency surgery (since fasting time is reduced), full stomach and altered gastrointestinal mobility. Increased fasting times leads to decreased injury if aspiration occurs.

== Gastric conditions ==
In addition to fasting, antacids are administered the night before (or in the morning of an afternoon operation) and then once again two hours prior to surgery. This is to increase the pH (make more neutral) of the acid present in the stomach, helping to reduce the damage caused by pulmonary aspiration, should it occur. H2 receptor blockers should be used in high-risk situations and should be administered in the same timing intervals as antacids.

Gastroparesis (delayed gastric emptying) may occur and is due to metabolic causes (e.g. poorly controlled diabetes mellitus), decreased gastric motility (e.g. due to head injury) or pyloric obstruction (e.g. pyloric stenosis). Delayed gastric emptying usually only affects the emptying of the stomach of high-cellulose foods such as vegetables. Gastric emptying of clear fluids such as water or black coffee is only affected in highly progressed delayed gastric emptying.

Usually, gastroesophageal reflux (GERD) may be associated with delayed gastric emptying of solids, but clear liquids are not affected. Raised intra-abdominal pressure (e.g. in pregnancy or obesity) predisposes to regurgitation. Certain drugs such as opiates can cause marked delays in gastric emptying, as can trauma, which can be determined by certain indicators such as normal bowel sounds and patient hunger.

== Minimum fasting times ==
The minimum fasting times prior to surgery have long been debated. The first proposition came from British anesthetists stating that patients should have nothing by mouth from midnight. However, since then, the American Society of Anesthesiologists (ASA), followed by the Association of Anaesthestists of Great Britain and Ireland (AAGBI), recommended new fasting guidelines for the minimum fast prior to surgery. This was based upon evidence by Canadian anesthesiologists who found that drinking clear fluids two hours prior to surgery decreased pulmonary aspiration compared to those nil by mouth since midnight. The following are the recommended guidelines for nil by mouth prior to surgery in healthy patients:

Age	Solids	Clear liquids
<6 months	4 hours	2 hours
6–36 months	6 hours	3 hours
>36 months (including adults)	6 hours	2 hours

When anaesthesia is required in an emergency, nasogastric aspiration is usually performed to reduce gastric contents and the risk of its pulmonary aspiration.

== Unrestricted clear fluids ==
Fasting guidelines often restrict the intake of any oral fluid after two to six hours preoperatively. However, it has been demonstrated in a large retrospective analysis in Torbay Hospital that unrestricted clear oral fluids right up until transfer to theatre could significantly reduce the incidence of postoperative nausea and vomiting without an increased risk in the adverse outcomes for which such conservative guidance exists.

== Public information ==
A 2016 systematic review found that the information on the internet often provided inaccurate and out-of-date recommendations on preoperative fasting.

== See also ==
- The Longevity Diet
