= Outline of anesthesia =

State of medically-controlled temporary loss of sensation or awareness

The following outline is provided as an overview of and topical guide to anesthesia:

Anesthesia – pharmacologically induced and reversible state of amnesia, analgesia, loss of responsiveness, loss of skeletal muscle reflexes or decreased sympathetic nervous system, or all simultaneously. This allows patients to undergo surgery and other procedures without the distress and pain they would otherwise experience. An alternative definition is a "reversible lack of awareness," including a total lack of awareness (e.g. a general anesthetic) or a lack of awareness of a part of the body such as a spinal anesthetic.

== Description of anesthesia ==
Anesthesia can be described as all of the following:

- Medical procedure
- Medical specialty

== Types of anesthesia ==
- General
- Spinal
- Epidural
- Local (Topical)
- Sedation / Twilight
- Dental (Inferior alveolar nerve)
- Neuroleptanalgesic anesthesia
- Nerve block

== History of anesthesia ==
- History of general anesthesia
- History of neuraxial anesthesia
- History of tracheal intubation

=== Plants/animals ===
- Aconite
- Castoreum
- cannabis
- Coca
- Deadly nightshade
- Henbane
- Lactucarium
- Mandrake
- Metel nut
- Opium
- Poison hemlock
- Saussurea
- Toloatzin
- Willow

=== People ===
- Abulcasis
- Avenzoar
- Avicenna
- Celsus
- Dioscorides
- Galen
- Hippocrates
- Rhazes
- Sabuncuoğlu
- Sushrutha
- Theophrastus
- Zhang

=== Compounds ===
- Aconitine
- Δ9-THC
- Atropine
- Cocaine
- Coniine
- Hyoscyamine
- Morphine
- Salicylate
- Scopolamine

== General anesthetic drugs ==
- General anaesthetic
- Benzodiazepine
- Etomidate
- FlyNap
- Infiltration analgesia
- Inhalational anaesthetic
- Ketamine
- Local anesthetic
- Methohexital
- Midazolam
- Neuraxial blockade
- Propofol
- Thiopental
- Thiopentone

== Anesthetic techniques ==
- Airway management
- Anesthesia provision in the US
- Capnography
- Concentration effect
- Dogliotti's principle
- Drug-induced amnesia
- Fink effect
- Intraoperative neurophysiological monitoring
- Laryngoscopy
- Nerve block

== Complications ==
- Agitated emergence
- Allergic reactions
- Anesthesia awareness
- Local anesthetic toxicity
- Malignant hyperthermia
- Perioperative mortality
- Postanesthetic shivering
- Postoperative nausea and vomiting
- Postoperative residual curarization

== Measurements ==
- ASA physical status classification system
- Baricity
- Bispectral index
- Direct Fick method
- Entropy monitoring
- Fick principle
- Goldman index
- Guedel's classification
- Mallampati score
- Minimum alveolar concentration
- Neuromuscular monitoring

== Instruments used in anesthesiology ==
Instruments used in anesthesiology

- Anaesthetic machine
- Anesthesia cart
- Boyle's machine
- Double-lumen endobronchial tube
- Gas cylinder
- Laryngeal mask airway
- Medical monitor
- Odom's indicator
- Relative analgesia machine
- Tracheal tube
- Vaporiser

== Fields of study ==
- Cardiothoracic
- Geriatric
- Oral sedation dentistry

== Professions ==
- Anesthesiologist
- Anesthesiologist assistant
- Nurse anesthetist
- Certified Anesthesia Technician
- Certified Anesthesia Technologist
- Anaesthetic technician

== Organizations ==
- American Association of Nurse Anesthetists
- American Society of Anesthesia Technologists & Technicians
- American Society of Anesthesiologists
- Anaesthesia Trauma and Critical Care
- Association of Anaesthetists of Great Britain and Ireland
- Association of Veterinary Anaesthetists
- Australian and New Zealand College of Anaesthetists
- Australian Society of Anaesthetists
- International Anesthesia Research Society

== Anesthesia publications ==
- Anesthesia & Analgesia
- Anesthesiology'
- British Journal of Anaesthesia

== Persons influential in anesthesia ==
- August Bier
- Crawford Long
- William T. G. Morton
- James Young Simpson
- Horace Wells
