= Abdominal surgery =

Medical specialty

The term abdominal surgery broadly covers surgical procedures that involve opening the abdomen (laparotomy). Surgery of each abdominal organ is dealt with separately in connection with the description of that organ (see stomach, kidney, liver, etc.) Diseases affecting the abdominal cavity are dealt with generally under their own names.

== Types ==
The most common abdominal surgeries are described below.

- Appendectomy: surgical opening of the abdominal cavity and removal of the appendix. Typically performed as definitive treatment for appendicitis, although sometimes the appendix is prophylactically removed incidental to another abdominal procedure.
- Caesarean section (also known as C-section): a surgical procedure in which one or more incisions are made through a mother's abdomen (laparotomy) and uterus (hysterotomy) to deliver one or more babies, or, rarely, to remove a dead fetus.
- Inguinal hernia surgery: the repair of an inguinal hernia.
- Exploratory laparotomy: the opening of the abdominal cavity for direct examination of its contents; for example, to locate a source of bleeding or trauma. It may or may not be followed by repair or removal of the primary problem.
- Laparoscopy: a minimally invasive approach to abdominal surgery where rigid tubes are inserted through small incisions into the abdominal cavity. The tubes allow introduction of a small camera, surgical instruments, and gases into the cavity for direct or indirect visualization and treatment of the abdomen. The abdomen is inflated with carbon dioxide gas to facilitate visualization and, often, a small video camera is used to show the procedure on a monitor in the operating room. The surgeon manipulates instruments within the abdominal cavity to perform procedures such as cholecystectomy (gallbladder removal), the most common laparoscopic procedure. The laparoscopic method speeds recovery time and reduces blood loss and infection as compared to the traditional "open" method.

== Complications ==
Complications of abdominal surgery include:

- Adhesions (also called scar tissue): complications of postoperative adhesion formation are frequent, they have a large negative effect on patients' health, and increase workload in clinical practice
- Bleeding
- Infection
- Paralytic ileus: short-term paralysis of the bowel
- Perioperative mortality, any death occurring within 30 days after surgery
- Shock

Sterile technique, aseptic post-operative care, antibiotics, use of the WHO Surgical Safety Checklist, and vigilant post-operative monitoring greatly reduce the risk of these complications. Planned surgery performed under sterile conditions is much less risky than that performed under emergency or unsterile conditions. The contents of the bowel are unsterile, and thus leakage of bowel contents, as from trauma, substantially increases the risk of infection.

Globally, there are few studies comparing perioperative mortality following abdominal surgery across different health systems. One major prospective study of 10,745 adult patients undergoing emergency laparotomy from 357 centres in 58 high-, middle-, and low-income countries found that mortality is three times higher in low- compared with high-HDI countries even when adjusted for prognostic factors. In this study the overall global mortality rate was 1.6 percent at 24 hours (high 1.1 percent, middle 1.9 percent, low 3.4 percent), increasing to 5.4 percent by 30 days (high 4.5 percent, middle 6.0 percent, low 8.6 percent). Of the 578 patients who died, 404 (69.9 percent) did so between 24 hours and 30 days following surgery (high 74.2 percent, middle 68.8 percent, low 60.5 percent). Patient safety factors were suggested to play an important role, with use of the WHO Surgical Safety Checklist associated with reduced mortality at 30 days.

Taking a similar approach, a unique global study of 1,409 children undergoing emergency laparotomy from 253 centres in 43 countries showed that adjusted mortality in children following surgery may be as high as 7 times greater in low-HDI and middle-HDI countries compared with high-HDI countries, translating to 40 excess deaths per 1,000 procedures performed in these settings. Internationally, the most common operations performed were appendectomy, small bowel resection, pyloromyotomy and correction of intussusception. After adjustment for patient and hospital risk factors, child mortality at 30 days was significantly higher in low-HDI (adjusted OR 7.14 (95% CI 2.52 to 20.23)) and middle-HDI (4.42 (1.44 to 13.56)) countries compared with high-HDI countries.

Absorption of drugs administered orally was shown to be significantly affected following abdominal surgery.

There is low-certainty evidence that there is no difference between using scalpel and electrosurgery in infection rates during major abdominal surgeries.

== See also ==
- Abdominoplasty
- ASA physical status classification system or perioperative physical fitness
- Diabetes
- General surgery
- Laparotomy
- Low-fiber/low-residue diet
- Perioperative mortality
