= Revised Cardiac Risk Index =

Medical tool for measuring risk of perioperative cardiac complications

The Revised Cardiac Risk Index (RCRI) is a tool used to estimate a patient's risk of perioperative cardiac complications.

== Description ==
The RCRI and similar clinical prediction tools are derived by looking for an association between preoperative variables (e.g., patient's age, type of surgery, comorbid diagnoses, or laboratory data) and the risk for cardiac complications in a cohort of surgical patients (the "derivation cohort"). Variables that have independent predictive value in a logistic regression analysis are incorporated into the risk index. Ideally, the accuracy and validity of the risk index is then tested in a separate cohort (the "validation cohort"). In 1977 Goldman, et al., developed the first cardiac risk index, which included nine variables associated with an increased risk of perioperative cardiac complications. This became known as the Original Cardiac Risk Index (or alternatively the Goldman Index). In 1999, Lee et al. published a cardiac risk index derived from 2893 patients and validated in 1422 patients aged ≥ 50 undergoing major noncardiac surgery, which became known as the Revised Cardiac Risk Index (RCRI). Lee identified six independent variables that predicted an increased risk for cardiac complications. A patient's risk for perioperative cardiac complications increased with number of variables that were present.

Revised Cardiac Risk Index
1. History of ischemic heart disease
2. History of congestive heart failure
3. History of cerebrovascular disease (stroke or transient ischemic attack)
4. History of diabetes requiring preoperative insulin use
5. Chronic kidney disease [creatinine > 2 mg/dL (176.8 μmol/L)]
6. Undergoing suprainguinal vascular, intraperitoneal, or intrathoracic surgery
Risk for cardiac death, nonfatal myocardial infarction, and nonfatal cardiac arrest:

0 predictors = 3.9%, 1 predictor = 6.0%, 2 predictors = 10.1%, ≥3 predictors = 15% (Duceppe 2017)

Compared with the Original Cardiac Risk Index, the RCRI was easier to use and more accurate. The RCRI was used widely in clinical practice, research, and was incorporated in a modified form into the 2007 preoperative cardiac risk evaluation guideline from the American Heart Association and American College of Cardiology. The ACC/AHA guidelines use the 5 clinical RCRI criteria in their screening algorithm. The surgery-specific risk (#6 on the above list) is included separately in the algorithm. Criterion #4, diabetes with insulin use was also changed to any diagnosis of diabetes in the ACC/AHA algorithm.

2014 ACC/AHA Perioperative Guidelines stated that two newer tools have been created by the American College of Surgeons, which prospectively collected data on operations performed in more than 252 participating hospitals in the United States. Data on more than 1 million operations have been used to create these risk calculators. This tool includes adjusted ORs for different surgical sites, with inguinal hernia as the reference group. Target complications were defined as cardiac arrest (defined as "chaotic cardiac rhythm requiring initiation of basic or advanced life support") or MI (defined as ≥1 of the following: documented electrocardiographic findings of MI, ST elevation of ≥1 mm in >1 contiguous leads, new left bundle-branch block, new Q-wave in ≥2 contiguous leads, or troponin >3 times normal in setting of suspected ischemia).

== Alternatives ==
In 2022, Onishchenko et al. published the Cardiac Comorbidity Risk (CCoR) score for assessing the risk of major adverse cardiac events (MACE) after hip and knee arthroplasty surgeries, that claimed to supersede the RCRI in predictive performance. Unlike the RCRI, the CCoR mines the history of medical encounters to identify subtle comorbidity signatures that increase the risk of cardiac events, and was claimed to reliably assess "low-risk" patients, e.g., ones with none of the risk factors that RCRI uses.

== See also ==
- ASA physical status classification system
