= NZATS =

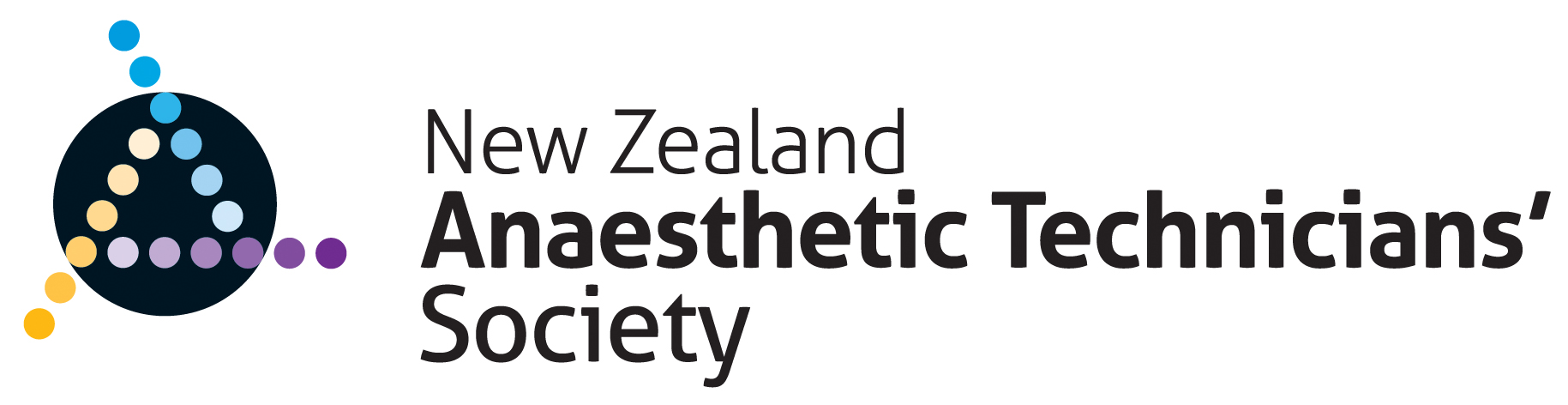
Logo of the NZATS

The New Zealand Anaesthetic Technicians' Society is an industry body representing anaesthetic technicians in New Zealand.

NZATS is the professional body representing Registered and Trainee anaesthetic technicians within New Zealand. NZATS provides continuing professional development opportunities, trainee education and support to all its members by promoting the profession. The New Zealand Anaesthetic Technicians Society hold a voluntary register of members. Anaesthetic Technicians have been registered under the Health Practitioners Competence Assurance Act 2003 since 2013 with the Medical Sciences Council of New Zealand.

== Advocacy ==
The New Zealand healthcare system has experienced issues with anaesthetic technician occupational burnout. The society has advocated for increased funding for ATs to bring more into the workforce and reduce the overall workload on individuals. Issues including burnout and pay resulted in a shortfall of 98 technicians at hospitals across New Zealand in 2023, with seven technicians quitting within one month at Christchurch Hospital.
