= WHO Surgical Safety Checklist =

Publication to increase patient safety during surgery

The World Health Organization (WHO) published the WHO Surgical Safety Checklist in 2008 in order to increase the safety of patients undergoing surgery. The checklist serves to remind the surgical team of important items to be performed before and after the surgical procedure in order to reduce adverse events such as surgical site infections or retained instruments. It is one affordable and sustainable tool for reducing deaths from surgery in low and middle income countries.

Several studies have shown the checklist to reduce the rate of deaths and surgical complications by as much as one-third in centres where it is used. While the checklist has been widely adopted due to its efficacy in many studies as well as for its simplicity, some hospitals still struggle with implementation due to local customs and to a lack of buy-in from surgical staff.

== Background ==
In 2004, the World Health Assembly (WHA) founded the WHO Patient Safety international alliance in order to tackle issues of adverse effects in unsafe healthcare. The Global Initiative for Emergency and Essential Surgical Care and the Guidelines for Essential Trauma Care focused on access and quality. In 2005, WHO Patient Safety began issuing Global Patient Safety Challenges, which bring together teams of specialists in order to put together clinical guidelines and tools for research that address patient safety issues, such as hand washing. In January 2007, an international consultation meeting was held on the second Global Patient Safety Challenge, called Safe Surgery Saves Lives. In 2004, an estimated 187 to 281 million surgeries were performed worldwide, with complications occurring in 3-22% and deaths in 0.4-0.8% of procedures; the death rate in major procedures rose to 5-10% in developing nations. Pointing to the ubiquity of the use of surgery in both the developed and developing world, WHO Patient Safety aimed to meet four main problems: a lack of awareness of the issue; a lack of data on surgical complications; inconsistent use of available safety resources; and increasing complexity of surgical procedures.

One of the recommendations of this Global Patient Safety Challenge was the adoption of a checklist for use in surgical procedures. As understood in common language, a checklist is a physical list of tasks to be done, with some measure of marking each item's completion (e.g., a square to be filled with a checkmark). While it is a simple intervention, the checklist has historically been used in many occupations as an organizational and as a safety tool; Atul Gawande, the Safe Surgery Saves Lives program leader, describes the influence that the checklists had on the development of the WHO Surgical Safety Checklist in his 2009 book The Checklist Manifesto. In particular, Gawande praised the impact of pilot checklists in mitigating aviation disasters, tracing their development back to disastrous test flights of the Boeing B-17 Flying Fortress. Because of its increased complexity, an experienced pilot had missed a step in flight, causing a crash; however, test pilots continued to fly the plane, albeit with short checklists that "fit on an index card, with step-by-step checks for takeoff, flight, landing, and taxiing ... the kind of stuff that pilots know how to do." In further testing, the B-17 was flown for 1.8 million miles without further incident; preflight and emergency pilot checklists became a standard safety feature for the industry. Gawande points to how checklists can be applicable in medicine by ensuring that practitioners do not skip important steps in procedures, both in complex, high-stress situations and in seemingly routine ones.

In compiling what would become the WHO Surgical Safety Checklist (SSC), the Safe Surgery Saves Lives group set out three goals: simplicity, wide applicability, and measurability. This drew some influence from a prior study that showed a significant decrease in central line infections following the use of a checklist that detailed the basic steps and hygiene requirements (hand-washing; avoidance of the femoral vein; use of chlorhexidine soap; use of sterile PPE and barrier drapes; and daily inspection for possible removal).

== Contents ==
The checklist places its nineteen items into three "phases" of a surgical procedure: sign-in (before induction of anesthesia, while the patient is still conscious); time-out (with the surgeon present, before skin incision); and sign-out, based on the Joint Commission's Universal Protocol. At each of these phases, the surgical team members present stop and make sure that the corresponding safety items have been performed (or that there is a valid reason to waive that requirement for the procedure). In order to avoid ambiguity in determining and documenting each step's completion, the WHO recommends that there should be only one clinician (usually a circulating nurse) in charge of marking each item on the checklist.

Safety item	Rationale
Sign-in (before induction of anesthesia)
Has the patient confirmed his/her identity, site, procedure, and consent?	"Wrong site," "wrong patient," and "wrong procedure" errors are uncommon, but serious, surgical mistakes, affecting 1 in 50,000 to 100,000 surgical procedures in the U.S.
Is the site marked?	Similarly, operating on the wrong bilateral structure (e.g. left vs right arm) or multiple structure (e.g. ribs) is relatively uncommon, but tends to be well-publicized and erodes trust in the surgeon. Factors such as availability of imaging as well as having the patient awake to confirm the mark on the surgical site can help reduce this complication.
Is the anaesthesia machine and medication check complete?	The SSC guidelines recommend examination of the "ABCDEs": the "Airway equipment, Breathing system (including oxygen and inhalational agents), suCtion, Drugs and Devices and Emergency medications, equipment and assistance."
Is the pulse oximeter on the patient and functioning?	Despite a lack of randomized controlled trials, the SSC guidelines recommend use of a pulse oximeter during surgery due to its exceedingly low risk and its potential benefit of catching catastrophic anesthesiology complications such as ventilator disconnection and esophageal intubation. Increasing the use of pulse oximetry and the SSC in developing nations is the goal of another WHO health initiative, the WHO Patient Safety Pulse Oximetry Project.
Does the patient have a known drug allergy?	Anaphylactic reactions occur in roughly 1 in 10,000 to 20,000 cases; oxygen, ventilation, antihistamines, and intravenous fluids are recommended in most protocols in case of this adverse event.
Does the patient have a difficult airway or aspiration risk?	The SSC guidelines recognize that there is no single best bedside test for identifying patients at risk; instead of advocating one test in particular, they call for the surgical team to have a plan to maintain ventilation should airway complications arise.
Does the patient have a risk of >500 mL blood loss? (7ml/kg in children)	Due to the risk of hypovolemic shock following blood loss in certain procedures, the surgical team may need to prepare large-bore intravenous access for crystalloid (such as saline) or blood transfusions
Time-out (before skin incision)
Confirm all team members have introduced themselves by name and role.	This action may increase the amount of team behaviors in the operating room and give each participant confidence in raising safety concerns later on; increased team behaviors are associated with fewer surgical complications (78-83).
Confirm the patient's name, procedure, and where the incision will be made.	
Has antibiotic prophylaxis been given within the last 60 minutes?	Depending on the specific drug and procedure, antibiotics should be given less than one or two hours before skin incision; otherwise, antibiotics will not reach the correct concentration in the blood. Patients treated with antibiotics outside the correct timeframe have similar rates of infections to those not given antibiotics at all.
Anticipated critical events for the surgeon: What are the critical or non-routine steps?; How long will the case take?; What is the anticipated blood loss?	
Anticipated critical events for the anesthetist: Are there any patient-specific concerns?	
Anticipated critical events for the nursing team: Has sterility (including indicator results) been confirmed?; Are there equipment issues or any concerns?	
Is essential imaging displayed?	Including necessary radiological imaging (e.g. X-rays, CT scans, MRI) is another step that can reduce "wrong-site" surgical markers
Sign-out (before the patient leaves the operating room)
Nurse verbally confirms: The name of the procedure; Completion of instrument, sponge and needle counts; Specimen labelling (read specimen labels aloud, including patient name); Whether there are any equipment problems to be addressed	The WHO SSC guidelines recommend two people (or one person with an automated device) perform the post-operative instrument, sponge, and needle counts; a study of retained surgical instruments found that the final count was erroneously believed to be correct in 88% of cases.
To surgeon, anaesthetist and nurse: What are the key concerns for recovery and management of this patient?	

== Impact ==
The Safe Surgery Saves Lives group held a study across eight hospitals worldwide, comparing their surgical safety measures and complication rates both before and after each local study team introduced the WHO Surgical Safety Checklist. They found that across the 3,733 surgical patients before implementation and 3,955 after, there was a significant decrease in both complication rate (11.0% to 7.0%, p<0.001) and death rate (1.5% to 0.8%, p = 0.003). An independent international study at 357 hospitals located in 58 countries has demonstrated that the use of a surgical safety checklist has been associated with a 38% lower odds of 30-day death after emergency abdominal surgery compared with the same operations performed at hospitals that didn't have a checklist. A subsequent analysis with additional pooled global data from 76 countries showed that checklist use was associated with a significantly lower perioperative mortality rate in emergency laparotomy, with checklist use associated with a lower 30‐day perioperative mortality (OR 0·60, 0·50 to 0·73; P < 0·001) in multivariable models. Checklist use was also significantly more common in countries with a high Human Development Index (HDI) than low HDI, yet the greatest absolute benefit was seen for emergency surgery in low‐ and middle‐HDI countries. Many subsequent studies have shown improvements in both surgical outcomes and in various safety measurements, such as increased prophylactic antibiotic use. These data have been attributed to a number of possible causes. Several studies reported improved safety as a direct result of the checklist, such unsafe conditions caught while going through items on the list, while others also reported improved safety more indirectly, such as through improved availability of antibiotics and pulse oximetry, whose absence was highlighted through use of the checklist. In addition, many studies report improvements in safety culture, such as "more sharing of case critical information, better decision-making and team coordination, openness about knowledge gaps, and improved team cohesion."

Other studies have failed to show surgical outcome improvements after the implementation of the SSC, whose causes may be indicative of the barriers to expanding its use. For example, the WHO guidelines recommend starting use of the checklist through the example of individual surgical teams well-versed in its intent and procedure. However, one study reported that, in one hospital, "staff understood neither why nor how the checklist could be implemented" due to a lack of training; in other studies, surgical staff were confused regarding who was intended to check off items on the SSC. Some hospitals lack training in the use of the surgical "time-out" procedure. Some hospitals that did successfully implement the SSC and find improved safety reported that changing the safety culture required time and effort by a "local champion" to ensure that all staff could see the benefits of the checklist. As could be expected, one study found that hospitals where the checklist "'just appeared' in operating rooms one day" faced issues with buy-in from staff. In addition, cultural differences caused compliance issues with certain items on the checklist, such as placing marks on the body in Thai hospitals or perceived awkwardness in introducing oneself. In such cases, WHO guidelines recommend flexibility in editing the checklist to better fit local conditions.

== Other checklists used in surgery ==
- The Joint Commission Universal Protocol was introduced in 2004 as a perioperative check to ensure the correct person, procedure, and site. While not used as a written checklist in the same manner as the SSC, WHO Patient Safety integrated its "time-out" as a pause point to check for wrong person/wrong procedure/wrong site errors.
- The SURgical PAtient Safety System SURPASS checklist was introduced in the Netherlands in order to capture the 53-70% of the surgical errors that occur outside the operating room (in contrast to the SSC, which focuses on errors that occur in the OR).
- In 2009, Yisrael Mordecai Safeek published the I AM FOR SAFETY checklist, which includes safety checks required by the American Society of Anesthesiologists (ASA) and Joint Commission as well as a modified version of the SSC (rewritten to correspond to a mnemonic starting with the letters "I AM FOR SAFETY".
