= American Society of Anesthesia Technologists & Technicians =

American nonprofit organization

- Formation: 1989
- Headquarters: Oak Creek, Wisconsin
- Location: United States
- President: Jeremy Wyatt Cer.A.T.
- Website: https://www.asatt.org/

The American Society of Anesthesia Technologists & Technicians, or ASATT, based in Oak Creek, Wisconsin, is a nonprofit, educational organization responsible for the standards of technologist/technician competency in all areas of anesthesia.

ASATT's mission is to establish a professional entity for the anesthesia technician that will positively affect health care and standards of quality in patient care by providing a safe anesthetic environment.

ASATT has the only nationally recognized certification for technicians (Cer.A.T.) and technologists (Cer.A.T.T.).

== Certification ==
Beginning July 25, 2015, ASATT will be phasing out the technician exam (Cer.A.T.) and on-the-job training for the Anesthesia Technology profession. The certification is still valid for those who hold it.

- Approved programs will be instructing at the Technologist (Cer.A.T.T.) level and graduates will be eligible to take the

Technologist (Cer.A.T.T.) exam.

- Current Certified Technicians (Cer.A.T.) and Technologists (Cer.A.T.T.) will remain as is, as long as they maintain their certification.

=== Technician (Cer.A.T.) ===
A certified anesthesia technician (Cer.A.T.) is person that has met the experience and examination requirements set for this certification established by ASATT. The certification exam is no longer offered. ASATT requires any candidate seeking certification (Cer.A.T.) to meet one of the following requirements:

- ASATT Certified anesthesia technician, Cer.A.T. – a no-longer-offered certification exam.
- Only certified anesthesia technologist Cer.A.T.T exams are currently offered through ASATT
- Cer.A.T's may advance to Cer.A.T.T through an advanced placement program sponsored by ASATT

=== Technologist (Cer.A.T.T.) ===
A certified anesthesia technologist (Cer.A.T.T.) is a person who has met the experience and examination requirements for this certification established by ASATT. Requirements to sit for the certified anesthesia technologist (Cer.A.T.T.) examination are the successful completion of a 2- or 4-year CAAHEP accredited / CoA-ATE approved program through ASATT. Current certified anesthesia technicians are re-certified every 2-years after the Cer.A.T.T. designation was granted. 30 hours of continuing education credits are needed every 2 years to recertify.

== Publication ==
The Society produces a quarterly publication known as The Sensor, which provide its readers information on anesthesia-related topics, and a forum for learning and discussion.

== Accreditations and memberships ==
- CAAHEP
- NOCA

== See also ==
- American Society of Anesthesiologists
- American Association of Nurse Anesthesiology
- Commission on Accreditation of Allied Health Education Programs
