= Commission on Accreditation of Allied Health Education Programs =

Commission on Accreditation of Allied Health Education Programs (CAAHEP) is an accreditation agency for postsecondary education programs in 30 health science fields.

Programmatic accreditation is granted after an education program is reviewed and it is determined that the program is in compliance with the profession's accreditation Standards. A not-for-profit organization, CAAHEP is recognized by the Council for Higher Education Accreditation (CHEA). It is based in Clearwater, Florida.

== Members and leadership ==
- CAAHEP's members are organizations that represent the professions accredited by CAAHEP and/or the institutions that teach CAAHEP-accredited programs.
- CAAHEP's leadership is composed of both a commission and a board of directors.

The individuals who serve as commissioners are representatives from CAAHEP's sponsoring organizations, along with a recent graduate of a CAAHEP accredited program and members of the general public. The Commissioners approve the organization's mission, vision, and bylaws, and decide which health science professions qualify to take part in the CAAHEP accreditation system. CAAHEP is also led by a board of directors, whose members are elected from among the Commissioners. When an education program in a health science profession seeks CAAHEP accreditation, the program will work with that profession's Committee on Accreditation (CoA).

== Brief history ==
In 1904, the American Medical Association established its Council on Medical Education (CME). The CME developed a rating system of medical schools in 1905, initiated inspections in 1906, and classified the institutions in 1907. The AMA then collaborated with the Carnegie Foundation to conduct a study of the quality of medical education that resulted in the Flexner Report in 1910. These early efforts subsequently led to the development of specialized accreditation for the education of health professionals. It was also the precursor of accreditation activities for most other professional associations.

Early in the 1930s, several national bodies requested the collaboration of the AMA in establishing accreditation for education programs in their areas of interest. These early efforts established a basis and pattern for the role of the AMA in collaborating with other national associations for the accreditation of health sciences education programs. From 1935 through 1976, the recognized agency was the AMA Council on Medical Education. In 1976 the CME delegated to the newly formed Committee on Allied Health Education and Accreditation (CAHEA) the responsibility and authority for health sciences education accreditation. In October, 1992 the AMA announced its intent to support the establishment of a new and independent agency to assume the accreditation responsibilities of CAHEA

As of 2026, CAAHEP’s executive director is Dr. Gina Scarboro, who was previously a dean and associate professor at South University.

== Programs Accredited by CAAHEP ==
CAAHEP accredits over 2,200 programs in 28 health science disciplines. The programs reside in more than 1,300 postsecondary educational institutions across the United States and Canada.

== Accredited Professions ==
by CAAHEP the professions are

- Advanced Cardiovascular Sonography
- Anesthesia Technician/Technologist
- Anesthesiologist Assistant
- Art Therapist
- Assistive Technology
- Cardiovascular Technologist
- Clinical Research Professional
- Cytotechnologist
- Diagnostic Medical Sonographer
- Emergency medical services
- Exercise Physiology
- Exercise Science
- Intraoperative Neurophysiologic Monitoring
- Kinesiotherapist
- Lactation Consultant
- Medical Assistant
- Medical Illustrator
- Orthoptic Fellowship Programs
- Orthotic and Prosthetic Technician
- Orthotic/Prosthetic Assistant
- Orthotist and Prosthetist
- Pedorthist
- Perfusionist
- Personal Fitness Trainer
- Polysomnographic Technologist
- Recreational Therapy
- Inclusive Rehabilitation Sciences
- Respiratory Care
- Specialist in Blood Banking Technology
- Surgical Assistant
- Surgical Technologist

== See also ==
- Allied Health Professions
- Educational Accreditation
- List of Recognized Accreditation Associations of Higher Learning
