= Dogliotti's principle =

Dogliotti's principle is a principle in epidural anaesthesia first described by Professor Achille Mario Dogliotti in 1933. It is a method for the identification of the epidural space, a potential space. As a needle is advanced through the ligamentum flavum, to the epidural space, with constant pressure applied to the piston of a syringe, loss of resistance occurs once the needle enters the epidural space due to the change in pressure. The identification of this space, allows subsequent administration of epidural anaesthesia, a technique used primarily for analgesia during childbirth.

This technique remains in use at present, and is commonly referred to the loss of resistance to saline technique (LORS) or its variation, the loss of resistance to air technique (LORA). These use, respectively, saline or air to identify the epidural space. The LORS technique is generally favoured due to the increased complication risk with the LORA technique such as pneumocephalus or air embolism.

== See also ==
- Epidural procedure
- History of neuraxial anesthesia
- Odom's indicator
