= Perioperative mortality =

Any death occurring within 30 days after surgery

Perioperative mortality has been defined as any death, regardless of cause, occurring within 30 days after surgery in or out of the hospital. Globally, 4.2 million people are estimated to die within 30 days of surgery each year. An important consideration in the decision to perform any surgical procedure is to weigh the benefits against the risks. Anesthesiologists and surgeons employ various methods in assessing whether a patient is in optimal condition from a medical standpoint prior to undertaking surgery, and various statistical tools are available. ASA score is the most well known of these.

== Intraoperative causes ==
Immediate complications during the surgical procedure, e.g. bleeding or perforation of organs may have lethal sequelae.

== Complications following surgery ==
=== Infection ===
Countries with a low human development index (HDI) carry a disproportionately greater burden of surgical site infections (SSI) than countries with a middle or high HDI and might have higher rates of antibiotic resistance. In view of the World Health Organization (WHO) recommendations on SSI prevention that highlight the absence of high-quality interventional research, urgent, pragmatic, randomised trials based in LMICs are needed to assess measures aiming to reduce this preventable complication.

Local infection of the operative field is prevented by using sterile technique, and prophylactic antibiotics are often given in abdominal surgery or patients known to have a heart defect or mechanical heart valves that are at risk of developing endocarditis.

Methods to decrease surgical site infections in spine surgery include the application of antiseptic skin preparation (a.g. Chlorhexidine gluconate in alcohol which is twice as effective as any other antiseptic for reducing the risk of infection), judicious use of surgical drains, prophylactic antibiotics, and vancomycin. Preventative antibiotics may also be effective.

Whether any specific dressing has an effect on the risk of surgical site infection of a wound that has been sutured closed is unclear.

A 2009 Cochrane systematic review aimed to assess the effects of strict blood glucose control around the time of operation to prevent SSIs. The authors concluded that there was insufficient evidence to support the routine adoption of this practice and that more randomized controlled trials were needed to address this research question.

=== Blood clots ===
Examples are deep vein thrombosis and pulmonary embolism, the risk of which can be mitigated by certain interventions, such as the administration of anticoagulants (e.g., warfarin or low molecular weight heparins), antiplatelet drugs (e.g., aspirin), compression stockings, and cyclical pneumatic calf compression in high risk patients.

=== Lungs ===
Many factors can influence the risk of postoperative pulmonary complications (PPC). (A major PPC can be defined as a postoperative pneumonia, respiratory failure, or the need for reintubation after extubation at the end of an anesthetic. Minor post-operative pulmonary complications include events such as atelectasis, bronchospasm, laryngospasm, and unanticipated need for supplemental oxygen therapy after the initial postoperative period.) Of all patient-related risk factors, good evidence supports patients with advanced age, ASA class II or greater, functional dependence, chronic obstructive pulmonary disease, and congestive heart failure, as those with increased risk for PPC. Of operative risk factors, surgical site is the most important predictor of risk for PPCs (aortic, thoracic, and upper abdominal surgeries being the highest-risk procedures, even in healthy patients. The value of preoperative testing, such as spirometry, to estimate pulmonary risk is of controversial value and is debated in medical literature. Among laboratory tests, a serum albumin level less than 35 g/L is the most powerful predictor and predicts PPC risk to a similar degree as the most important patient-related risk factors.

Respiratory therapy has a place in preventing pneumonia related to atelectasis, which occurs especially in patients recovering from thoracic and abdominal surgery..

=== Neurologic ===
Strokes occur at a higher rate during the postoperative period.

=== Livers and kidneys ===
In people with cirrhosis, the perioperative mortality is predicted by the Child-Pugh score.

=== Postoperative fever ===
Postoperative fevers are a common complication after surgery and can be a hallmark of a serious underlying sepsis, such as pneumonia, urinary tract infection, deep vein thrombosis, wound infection, etc. However, in the early post-operative period a low-level fever may also result from anaesthetic-related atelectasis, which will usually resolve normally.

== Epidemiology ==
Most perioperative mortality is attributable to complications from the operation (such as bleeding, sepsis, and failure of vital organs) or pre-existing medical conditions.. Although in some high-resource health care systems, statistics are kept by mandatory reporting of perioperative mortality, this is not done in most countries. For this reason a figure for total global perioperative mortality can only be estimated. A study based on extrapolation from existing data sources estimated that 4.2 million people die within 30 days of surgery every year, with half of these deaths occurring in low- and middle-income countries.

Perioperative mortality figures can be published in league tables that compare the quality of hospitals. Critics of this system point out that perioperative mortality may not reflect poor performance but could be caused by other factors, e.g. a high proportion of acute/unplanned surgery, or other patient-related factors. Most hospitals have regular meetings to discuss surgical complications and perioperative mortality. Specific cases may be investigated more closely if a preventable cause has been identified.

Globally, there are few studies comparing perioperative mortality across different health systems. One prospective study of 10,745 adult patients undergoing emergency abdominal surgery from 357 centres across 58 countries found that mortality is three times higher in low- compared with high-human development index (HDI) countries even when adjusted for prognostic factors. In this study the overall global mortality rate was 1·6 per cent at 24 hours (high HDI 1·1 per cent, middle HDI 1·9 per cent, low HDI 3·4 per cent), increasing to 5·4 per cent by 30 days (high HDI 4·5 per cent, middle HDI 6·0 per cent, low HDI 8·6 per cent; P < 0·001). A sub-study of 1,409 children undergoing emergency abdominal surgery from 253 centres across 43 countries found that adjusted mortality in children following surgery may be as high as 7 times greater in low-HDI and middle-HDI countries compared with high-HDI countries. This translate to 40 excess deaths per 1000 procedures performed in these settings. Patient safety factors were suggested to play an important role, with use of the WHO Surgical Safety Checklist associated with reduced mortality at 30 days.

Mortality directly related to anesthetic management is less common, and may include such causes as pulmonary aspiration of gastric contents, asphyxiation and anaphylaxis. These in turn may result from malfunction of anesthesia-related equipment or more commonly, human error. A 1978 study found that 82% of preventable anesthesia mishaps were the result of human error.

In a 1954 review of 599,548 surgical procedures at 10 hospitals in the United States between 1948 – 1952, 384 deaths were attributed to anesthesia, for an overall mortality rate of 0.064%. In 1984, after a television program highlighting anesthesia mishaps aired in the United States, American anesthesiologist Ellison C. Pierce appointed a committee called the Anesthesia Patient Safety and Risk Management Committee of the American Society of Anesthesiologists. This committee was tasked with determining and reducing the causes of peri-anesthetic morbidity and mortality. An outgrowth of this committee, the Anesthesia Patient Safety Foundation was created in 1985 as an independent, nonprofit corporation with the vision that "no patient shall be harmed by anesthesia".

The current mortality attributable to the management of general anesthesia is controversial. Most current estimates of perioperative mortality range from 1 death in 53 anesthetics to 1 in 5,417 anesthetics. The incidence of perioperative mortality that is directly attributable to anesthesia ranges from 1 in 6,795 to 1 in 200,200 anesthetics. There are some studies however that report a much lower mortality rate. For example, a 1997 Canadian retrospective review of 2,830,000 oral surgical procedures in Ontario between 1973 – 1995 reported only four deaths in cases in which either an oral and maxillofacial surgeon or a dentist with specialized training in anesthesia administered the general anesthetic or deep sedation. The authors calculated an overall mortality rate of 1.4 per 1,000,000. It is suggested that these wide ranges may be caused by differences in operational definitions and reporting sources.

The largest study of postoperative mortality was published in 2010. In this review of 3.7 million surgical procedures at 102 hospitals in the Netherlands during 1991 – 2005, postoperative mortality from all causes was observed in 67,879 patients, for an overall rate of 1.85%.

Anaesthesiologists are committed to continuously reducing perioperative mortality and morbidity. In 2010, the principal European anaesthesiology organisations launched The Helsinki Declaration for Patient Safety in Anaesthesiology, a practically based manifesto for improving anaesthesia care in Europe.

== See also ==
- Patient safety
- ASA physical status classification system
