= Odom's indicator =

Technique in regional anaesthesia

Odom's indicator is a device used for locating the epidural space in regional anaesthesia. The device works on Dogliotti's principle by finding an area of decreased resistance to injection. It was originally designed on the assumption that the pressure in the epidural space was negative. This device is no-longer popular and alternative methods (e.g. loss of resistance to saline, loss of resistance to air) are now used.

== See also ==
- Epidural procedure, which contains additional information on identification of the epidural space
