= ASA physical status classification system =

System for assessing the fitness of patients before surgery

- Purpose: assess individual fitness prior to surgery

The ASA physical status classification system is a system for assessing the fitness of patients before surgery. In 1963, the American Society of Anesthesiologists (ASA) adopted the five-category physical status classification system; a sixth category was later added. These are:

1. Healthy person.
2. Mild systemic disease.
3. Severe systemic disease.
4. Severe systemic disease that is a constant threat to life.
5. A moribund person who is not expected to survive without the operation.
6. A declared brain-dead person whose organs are being removed for donor purposes.

If the surgery is an emergency, the physical status classification is followed by "E" (for emergency), for example, "3E". Class 5 is usually an emergency and is therefore usually "5E". The class "6E" does not exist and is simply recorded as class "6", as all organ retrieval in brain-dead patients is done urgently. The original definition of emergency in 1940, when ASA classification was first designed, was "a surgical procedure which, in the surgeon's opinion, should be performed without delay," but is now defined as "when [a] delay in treatment would significantly increase the threat to the patient's life or body part."

== Limitations and proposed modifications ==
These definitions appear in each annual edition of the ASA Relative Value Guide. There is no additional information that can be helpful to further define these categories.

An example of an ASA status classification system is that used by dental professionals. Many include the "functional limitation" or "anxiety" to determine classification, which is not mentioned in the actual definition, but may prove to be beneficial when dealing with certain complex cases. Often, different anesthesia providers assign different grades to the same case.

Some anesthesiologists now propose that, like an "E" modifier for emergency, a "P" modifier for pregnancy should be added to the ASA score.

== Uses ==
While anesthesia providers use this scale to indicate a person's overall preoperative health, it may be misinterpreted by hospitals, law firms, accrediting boards and other healthcare organizations as a scale to predict risk, and thus decide if a patient should have—or should have had—an operation. For predicting operative risk, other factors—such as age, presence of comorbidities, the nature and extent of the operative procedure, selection of anesthetic techniques, the competency of the surgical team (i.e., surgeons, anesthesia providers, and assisting staff), duration of surgery or anesthesia, availability of equipment, medications, blood, implants, and appropriate postoperative care—are often far more important than the ASA physical status.

== History ==
In 1940–41, ASA asked a committee of three physicians (Meyer Saklad, Emery Rovenstine, and Ivan Taylor) to study, examine, experiment and devise a system for the collection and tabulation of statistical data in anesthesia which could be applicable under any circumstances. This effort was the first by any medical specialty to stratify risk. While their mission was to determine predictors for operative risk, they quickly dismissed this task as being impossible to devise. They state:

"In attempting to standardize and define what has heretofore been considered 'Operative Risk', it was found that the term ... could not be used. It was felt that for the purposes of the anesthesia record and for any future evaluation of anesthetic agents or surgical procedures, it would be best to classify and grade the person in relation to his physical status only."

The scale they proposed addressed the patient's preoperative state only, not the surgical procedure or other factors that could influence surgical outcome. They hoped anesthesiologists from all parts of the country would adopt their "common terminology," making statistical comparisons of morbidity and mortality possible by comparing outcomes to "the operative procedure and the patient's preoperative condition".

They described a six-point scale, ranging from a healthy person (class 1) to one with an extreme systemic disorder that is an imminent threat to life (class 4). The first four points of their scale roughly correspond to today's ASA classes 1–4, which were first published in 1963. The original authors included two classes that encompassed emergencies which otherwise would have been coded in either the first two classes (class 5) or the second two (class 6). By the time of the 1963 publication of the present classification, two modifications were made. First, previous classes 5 and 6 were removed and a new class 5 was added for moribund persons not expected to survive 24 hours, with or without surgery. Second, separate classes for emergencies were eliminated in lieu of the "E" modifier of the other classes. The sixth class is now used for declared brain-dead organ donors. Saklad gave examples of each class of patient in an attempt to encourage uniformity. Unfortunately, the ASA did not later describe each category with examples of patients and thus actually increased confusion.

=== Original definition by Saklad et al. ===
Class	Original
1	No organic pathology or patients in whom the pathological process is localized and does not cause any systemic disturbance or abnormality. Examples: This includes patients suffering with fractures unless shock, blood loss, emboli or systemic signs of injury are present in an individual who would otherwise fall in Class 1. It includes congenital deformities unless they are causing systemic disturbance. Infections that are localized and do not cause fever, many osseous deformities, and uncomplicated hernias are included. Any type of operation may fall in this class since only the patient's physical condition is considered.
2	A moderate but definite systemic disturbance, caused either by the condition that is to be treated or surgical intervention or which is caused by other existing pathological processes, forms this group. Examples: Mild diabetes. Functional capacity I or IIa. Psychotic patients unable to care for themselves. Mild acidosis. Anemia moderate. Septic or acute pharyngitis. Chronic sinusitis with postnasal discharge. Acute sinusitis. Minor or superficial infections that cause a systemic reaction. (If there is no systemic reaction, fever, malaise, leukocytosis, etc., aid in classifying.) Nontoxic adenoma of thyroid that causes partial respiratory obstruction. Mild thyrotoxicosis. Acute osteomyelitis (early). Chronic osteomyelitis. Pulmonary tuberculosis with involvement of pulmonary tissue insufficient to embarrass activity and without other symptoms.
3	Severe systemic disturbance from any cause or causes. It is not possible to state an absolute measure of severity, as this is a matter of clinical judgment. The following examples are given as suggestions to help demonstrate the difference between this class and Class 2. Examples: Complicated or severe diabetes. Functional capacity IIb. Combinations of heart disease and respiratory disease or others that impair normal functions severely. Complete intestinal obstruction that has existed long enough to cause serious physiological disturbance. Pulmonary tuberculosis that, because of the extent of the lesion or treatment, has induced vital capacity sufficiently to cause tachycardia or dyspnea. Patients debilitated by prolonged illness with weakness of all or several systems. Severe trauma from accident resulting in shock, which may be improved by treatment. Pulmonary abscess.
4	Extreme systemic disorders which have already become an imminent threat to life regardless of the type of treatment. Because of their duration or nature there has already been damage to the organism that is irreversible. This class is intended to include only patients that are in an extremely poor physical state. There may not be much occasion to use this classification, but it should serve a purpose in separating the patient in very poor condition from others. Examples: Functional capacity III -(Cardiac Decompensation). Severe trauma with irreparable damage. Complete intestinal obstruction of long duration in a patient who is already debilitated. A combination of cardiovascular-renal disease with marked renal impairment. Patients who must have anesthesia to arrest a secondary hemorrhage where the patient is in poor condition associated with marked loss of blood. Emergency Surgery: An emergency operation is arbitrarily defined as a surgical procedure which, in the surgeon's opinion, should be performed without delay.
5	Emergencies that would otherwise be graded in Class 1 or Class 2.
6	Emergencies that would otherwise be graded as Class 3 or Class 4.

== See also ==
- Anesthetic equipment
- Anesthetics
- BIS monitor to assess the depth of anesthesia
- Perioperative mortality
- Category:Medical scales
