= Instruments used in anesthesiology =

Following is a list of instruments used in the practice of anesthesia.

== Instrument list ==
Instrument	Uses
Continuous-flow anaesthetic machine	used to provide a measured and continuous supply of gases (oxygen, nitrous oxide, etc.), mixed with a required concentration of anesthetic vapor to the patient at a required pressure and rate; video link
Anesthetic vaporizers	vaporizes the anesthetic
Oxygen mask	to deliver oxygen and/or to administer aerosolized medications
Nasal oxygen set	to deliver oxygen
Guedel airways	hard part of the airway maintenance that connects the mouth part to the pharyngeal part
Yankauer suction tip	Suction catheters used to remove secretions from the mouth, oropharynx, trachea and bronchi
Peripheral venous catheter	
Water & sand weight bag	
Artificial resuscitator (Bag valve mask)	manual ventilation
Bain circuit	respiratory maintenance circuit
Laryngoscope	used to view larynx including the vocal cords, the glottis, etc.
Endotracheal tube	a tube introduced into the patient's trachea to maintain a patient to ensure that air reaches the lungs for respiration
Laryngeal mask airway (LMA)	a less stimulating alternative to an endotracheal tube
Endoscope	to look inside the larynx, trachea, bronchi
Eschmann stylet or Gum elastic bougie	a flexible device introduced through the mouth during some intubation procedures; if the stylet is in the trachea, while passing in, gives a sensation of bumps and then finally stops going in at a point, it indicates that it was gliding over tracheal rings and has stopped at one of the bronchi (the patient may even cough during this time); if it goes into the esophagus, it will not bump and neither will it stop going in; used to judge where the endotracheal tube has gone in
HEPA Filter	to filter out dust particles from the gas being given to the patient
Hypodermic needle	for injections, infusions, etc.
Tuohy needle	for epidural catheter insertion
Spinal needle	used for puncturing the spinal canal for injection of medications in spinal anaesthesia
Epidural catheter	used to administer medications into the epidural space
Syringe	to inject medications
Mucus sucker	to aspirate any fluid specially mucus from the respiratory passage
Variable performance devices	
Fixed performance devices	
Peripheral Nerve Stimulator	to locate the nerve during regional anesthesia
TOF Monitor	to decide the repeat / reverse the anesthesia effect

=== Anesthetic machine ===
General anesthesia does not always require the anesthetic machine, tested daily, as basic equipment. Anesthesia machines may differ in appearance, size and degree of sophistication but generally speaking, they consist of sections for:

- ventilation
- Peripheral Nerve Stimulator
- space for monitoring equipment
- accessories
- storage space
- worktop

It is imperative that essential medical pipeline gas supply, e.g. oxygen], nitrous oxide and air, are secured firmly to the machine, and readily available without any obstructions, defects or pressure leaks. They should also be checked in between cases, ensuring that the breathing apparatus and breathing circuit are fully patent, for the safe anesthesia of patients. Major manufacturers of anesthetic machines are General Electric (GE), Larsen & Toubro Limited, Draeger and MAQUET.

== Image gallery ==
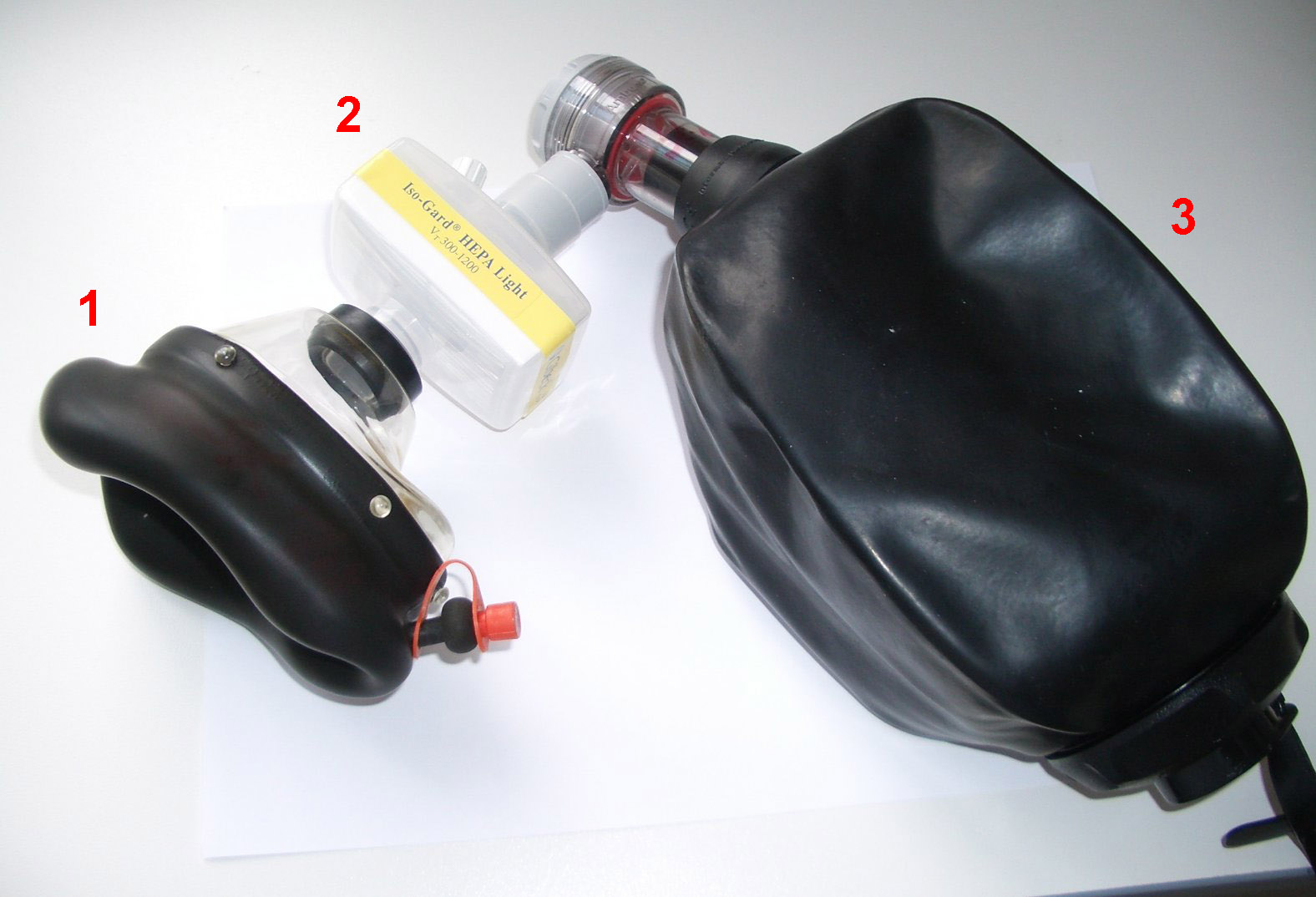
The respirator bag valve mask

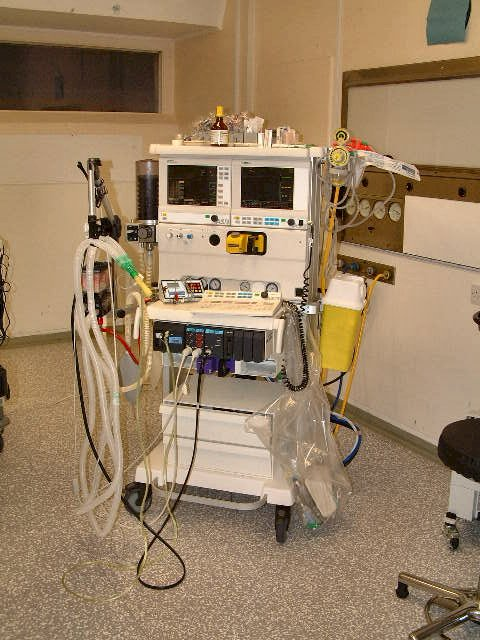
Anesthesia machine

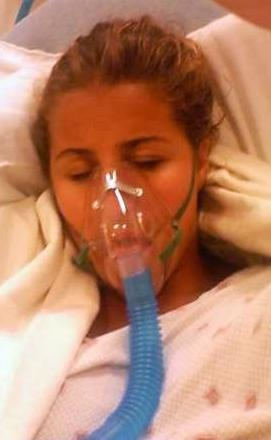
Oxygen mask

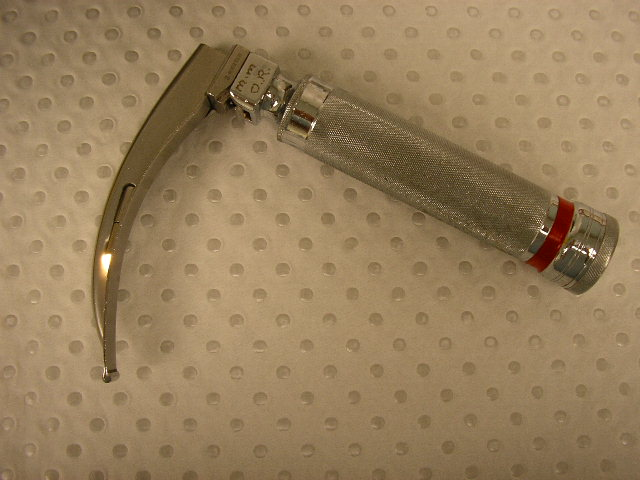
Laryngoscope

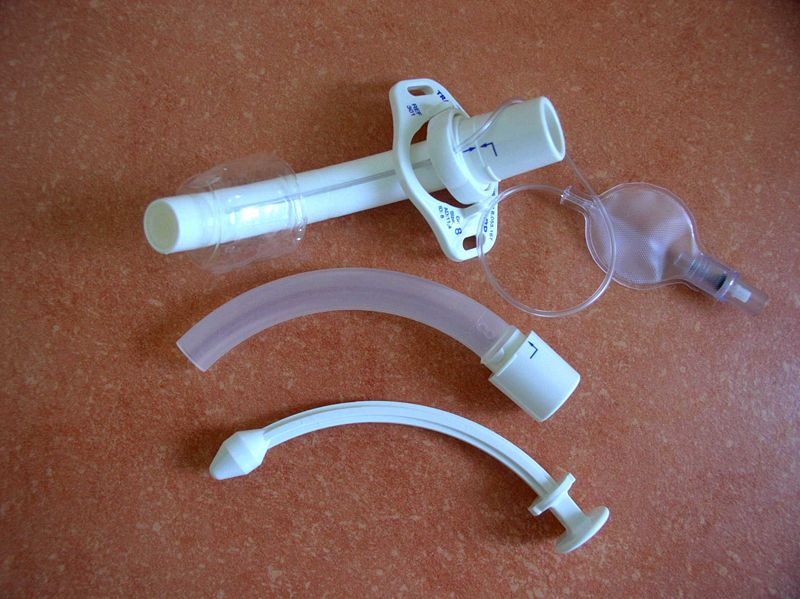
Tracheostomy tube

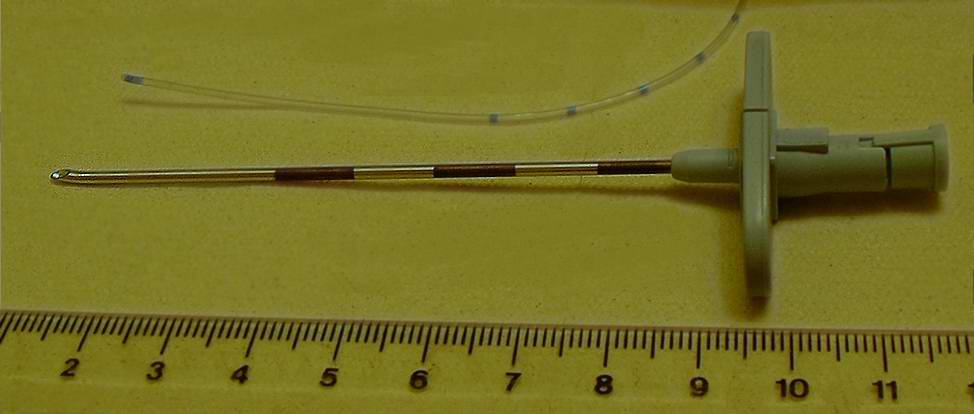
Tuohy needle

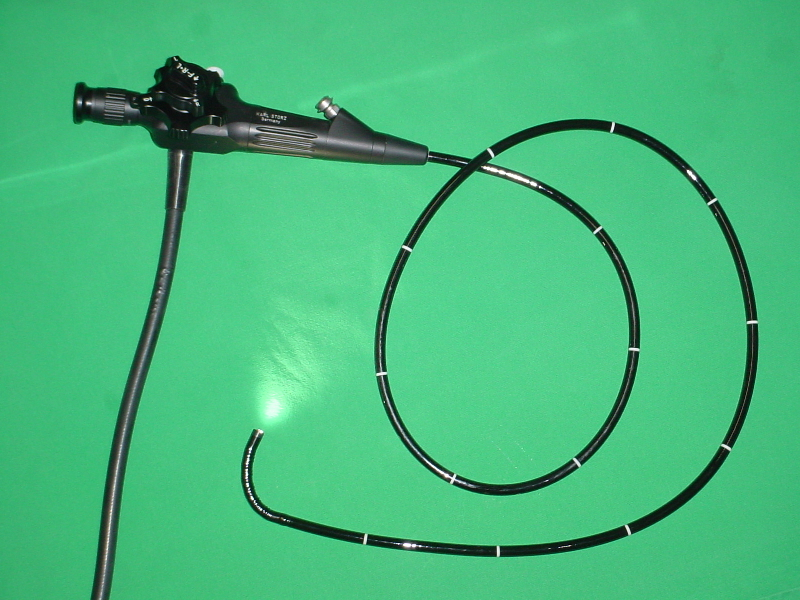
Flexible Endoscope

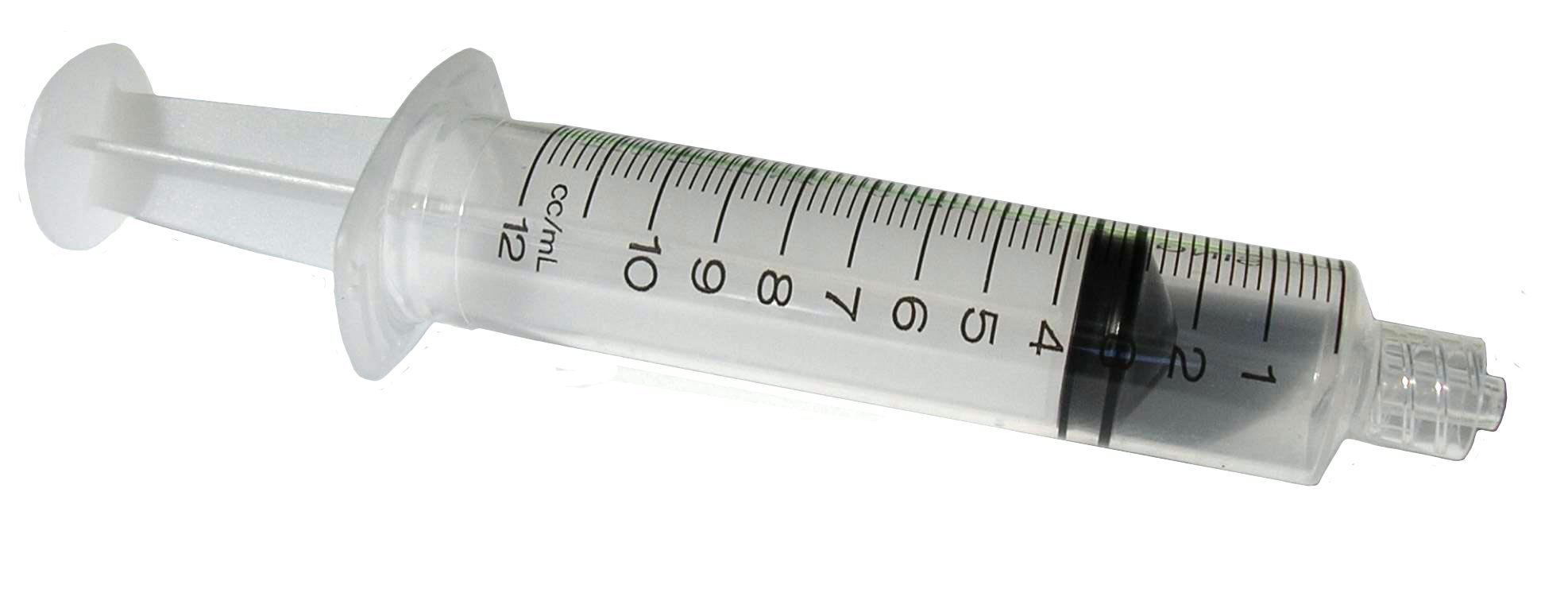
Syringe

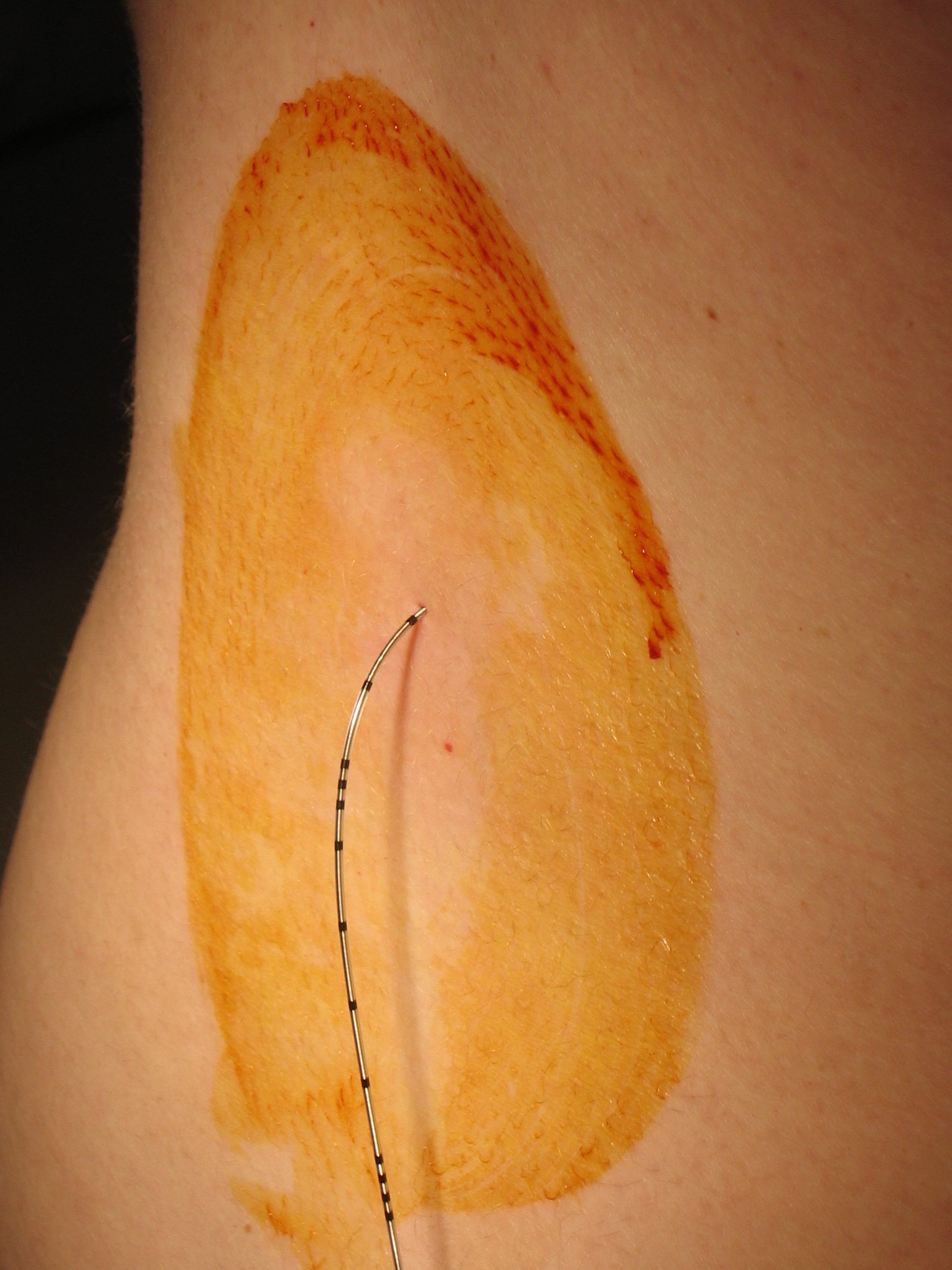
Epidural catheter

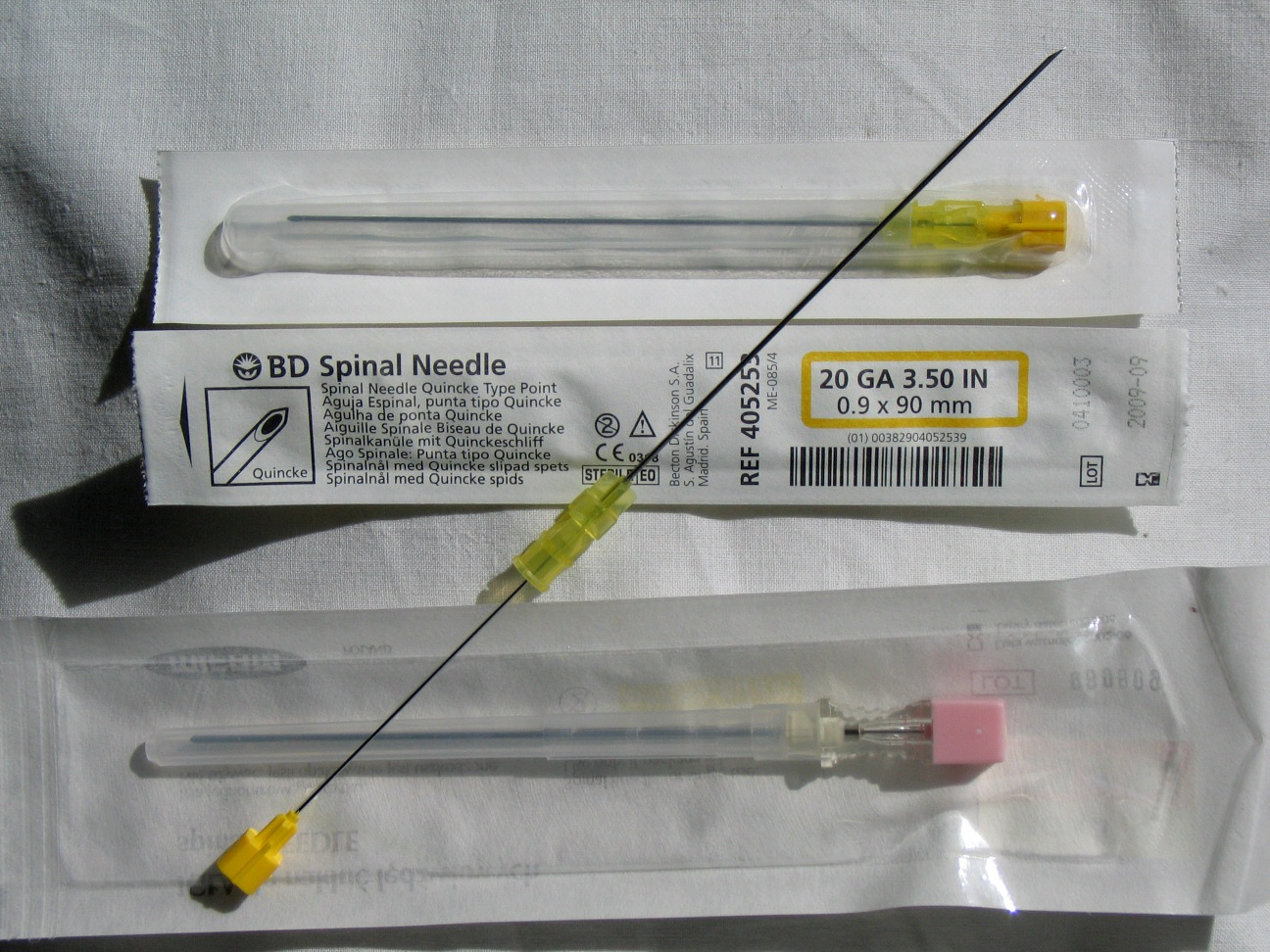
Spinal needles

== See also ==
- Anesthetic machine
