= Anesthetic technician =

Type of healthcare professional

Anesthetic technicians use infusion pumps to deliver medications.

Drug ampoules contain small amounts of medications.

An anesthetic technician is a healthcare professional who performs a patient care role predominantly with the administration and monitoring of anesthesia and has an extensive knowledge of anesthesia techniques, instruments, supplies and technology.

Anesthetic technicians are mainly employed by anesthetic departments or operating theatre suites, but can be found in other areas of clinical practice including emergency departments, intensive care units (ICU) and day surgery clinics.

== Role description ==
Anesthetic technicians are involved with all aspects of the delivery of a patient's perioperative anesthetic care, taking into account the patients' religious and cultural beliefs and respecting their right to medical privacy and dignity at all times. Anesthetic Technicians also provide a key role in the emergency resuscitation of patients.

=== Prior to anesthesia ===
Anesthetic technicians prepare equipment needed for the patient to safely undergo anesthesia. This involves:

- checking and setting up the anesthetic machine
- preparing intravenous drugs
- preparing intravenous therapy administration equipment
- preparing a range of devices to maintain the patient's airway (e.g. laryngeal masks, endotracheal tube)
- communicating with the patient when they arrive into the operating theatre
- establish peripheral intravenous access.
- applying anesthetic monitoring to help assess the patients' condition whilst under anesthesia. This may include electrocardiography (ECG), blood pressure and oxygen saturation devices. The monitoring of other parameters such as anesthesia depth monitors (EEG, bispectral index etc.) may also be necessary.

=== During anesthesia ===
The anesthetic technicians role includes assisting with:

- inducing and maintaining adequate anesthesia.
- establishing and securing an airway.
- making sure that patients are positioned in such a way not to cause discomfort or injury during their procedure.
- monitoring and maintaining patients' vital signs and anesthesia depth.
- temperature monitoring and regulation.
- collection and analysis of patient (blood) samples.
- acquiring and administering transfusion fluids and equipment.

=== After anesthesia ===
Anesthetic technicians assist the anesthetist with:

- waking the patient.by administration of reversal agent to access spontaneous recovery
- removing airway devices.
- transferring patients to post-operative care units

=== Other activities ===
Regional variations exist, but anesthetic technicians may also be involved with:

- Airway establishment & management.
- Intra-operative intra-aortic balloon pump setup, operating and monitoring.
- Elective & Emergency Blood Management.
- Swan-Ganz pulmonary artery catheter insertion and monitoring.
- Intra-operative blood salvage setup, operating and monitoring.
- Drawing of blood Samples.
- Arterial blood gas analysis, including maintenance of analysers.
- Arterial line insertion and monitoring.
- Peripheral IV line insertion.
- Cardiopulmonary resuscitation.
- Central IV lines.
- TEG Sampling.
- Point of Care Analysis.

== Occupational Hazards ==
=== Physical and Ergonomic Hazards ===
Anesthesia practice comes with a variety of physical, ergonomic, chemical, and biological risks in the workplace. The physical hazards associated with anesthesiology practice include noise exposure and ionizing radiation in the operating room. Anesthesia technicians also face ergonomic risks. In 2013, 85% of anesthesiologists reported having ergonomic inconveniences, and anesthesia technicians largely use the same equipment as anesthesiologists on top of having their own physically demanding responsibilities, such as restocking the anesthesia and setting up the equipment before operations.

=== Chemical Hazards ===
Inadequate disposal of waste anesthetic gases is one of the most common mistakes in the practice. Outdated or inadequate ventilation systems results in continuous exposure. Nitrous oxide is one of the most common gases used when conducting anesthesia operations. Chronic exposure has many side effects depending on how long technicians are exposed for. Short term exposure can lead to nausea, dizziness, and decreased cognitive performance while long term may affect reproductive functions.

=== Biological Hazards ===
Anesthesia technicians are exposed to various infectious disease inside the clinical environment. Being in the vicinity of patients often leave technicians susceptible to airborne diseases such as Influenza and Coronavirus. Bloodborne disease also play significant role as hazards inside the work environment. Equipment, especially sharp objects, often graze or touch the technicians which can lead to infection of HIV or Hepatitis C. 25% of needlestick injuries occur inside operating rooms, with many reporting fatigue and high pressure environments.

== American Society of Anesthesia Technologists & Technicians ==
American Society of Anesthesia Technologists & Technicians (ASATT), acknowledges the scope of practice for the Anesthesia technical personnel. The commitment of ASATT is to ensure that efficient, safe, competent, and ethical practices are provided to society and maintaining professional standards of practice. ASATT acknowledges that the Anesthesia technical personnel are a part of the Anesthesia care team as listed in the practice guidelines of the American Society of Anesthesiologists (ASA). This position should not be confused with that of an anesthesiologist assistant who actively participates as a licensed anesthesia provider.

== See also ==
- Clinical officer anesthetists
- Physician assistant
- Anesthesiologist assistant
- Operating Department Practitioner
