= Anesthesia awareness =

Rare complication of general anesthesia

- Other names: Intraoperative awareness, accidental awareness during general anesthesia
- Specialty: Anesthesiology, psychiatry

Awareness under anesthesia, also referred to as intraoperative awareness or accidental awareness during general anesthesia (AAGA), is a rare complication of general anesthesia wherein patients regain varying levels of consciousness during their surgical procedures without becoming aggressive or dangerous. While anesthesia awareness is possible without resulting in any long-term memory of the experience, it is also possible for victims to have awareness with explicit recall, where they can remember the events related to their surgery (intraoperative awareness with explicit recall).

Intraoperative awareness with explicit recall is an infrequent condition with potentially devastating psychological consequences. While it has gained popular recognition in the press, research shows that it occurs at an incidence rate of only 0.1–0.2%. Patients report a variety of experiences, ranging from vague, dreamlike states to being fully awake, immobilized, and in pain from the surgery. Intraoperative awareness is usually caused by the delivery of inadequate anesthetics relative to the patient's requirements. Risk factors can be anesthetic (e.g., use of neuromuscular blockade drugs, use of intravenous anesthetics, technical/mechanical errors), surgical (e.g., cardiac surgery, trauma/emergency, C-sections), or patient-related (e.g., reduced cardiovascular reserve, history of substance use, history of awareness under anesthesia).

Currently, the mechanism behind consciousness and memory under anesthesia is unknown, although there are many working hypotheses. However, intraoperative monitoring of anesthetic level with bispectral index (BIS) or end-tidal anesthetic concentration (ETAC) may help to reduce the incidence of intraoperative awareness, although clinical trials have yet to show a decreased incidence of AAGA with the BIS monitor.

There are also many preventative techniques considered for high-risk patients, such as pre-medicating with benzodiazepines, avoiding complete muscle paralysis, and managing patients' expectations. Diagnosis is made postoperatively by asking patients about potential awareness episodes and can be aided by the modified Brice interview questionnaire. A common but devastating complication of intraoperative awareness with recall is the development of post-traumatic stress disorder (PTSD) from the events experienced during surgery. Prompt diagnosis and referral to counseling and psychiatric treatment are crucial to the treatment of intraoperative awareness and the prevention of PTSD.

== Signs and symptoms ==
Intraoperative awareness can present with a variety of signs and symptoms. A large proportion of patients report vague, dreamlike experiences, while others report specific intraoperative events, such as:

- hearing noises or conversations in the operating room
- remembering details of the operation
- sensing pain associated with intubation or surgery
- having weakness or muscle paralysis
- feeling anxiety, helplessness, or a sense of impending doom

Intraoperative signs that may indicate patient awareness include:

- hypertension
- tachycardia
- patient movement
- tachypnea
- intravenous anesthesia line infiltrated or occluded

Patients under anesthesia are paralyzed if a neuromuscular blockade drug, a type of muscle relaxant, has been given as part of general anesthesia. When paralyzed, patients may not be able to communicate their distress or alert the operating room staff of their consciousness until the paralytic wears off. After surgery, recognition of the symptoms of an awareness event may be delayed. One review showed that only about 35% of patients are able to report an awareness event immediately after the surgery, with the rest remembering the experience from weeks to months afterward. Depending on the awareness experience, patients may have postoperative psychological problems that range from mild anxiety to post-traumatic stress disorder (PTSD). PTSD is characterized by recurrent anxiety, irritability, flashbacks or nightmares, avoidance of triggers related to the trauma, and sleep disturbances.

== Causes ==
=== Paralytic and muscle relaxant use ===
The biggest risk factor is anesthesia performed by unsupervised trainees and the use of a medication that induces muscle paralysis, such as suxamethonium (succinylcholine) or non-depolarizing neuromuscular blocking drugs (muscle relaxants). During general anesthesia, the patient's muscles may be paralyzed in order to facilitate tracheal intubation or surgical exposure (abdominal and thoracic surgery can be performed only with adequate muscle relaxation). Because the patient cannot breathe for themselves, mechanical ventilation must be used. The paralyzing agent does not cause unconsciousness or take away the patient's ability to feel pain, but does prevent the patient from breathing, so the airway (trachea) must be protected and the lungs ventilated to ensure adequate oxygenation of the blood and removal of carbon dioxide.

A fully paralyzed patient is unable to move, speak, blink the eyes, or otherwise respond to the pain. If neuromuscular blocking drugs are used, this causes skeletal muscle paralysis but does not interfere with cardiac or smooth muscle or the functioning of the autonomic nervous system, so heart rate, blood pressure, intestinal peristalsis, sweating and lacrimation are unaffected. The patient cannot signal distress and may not exhibit the signs of awareness that would be expected to be detectable by clinical vigilance, because other drugs used during anaesthesia may block or obtund these.

Many types of surgery do not require the patient to be paralyzed. A patient who is anesthetized but not paralyzed can move in response to a painful stimulus if the analgesia is inadequate. This may serve as a warning sign that the anesthetic depth is inadequate. Movement under general anesthesia does not imply full awareness but is a sign that the anesthesia is light. Even without the use of neuromuscular blocking drugs the absence of movement does not necessarily imply anesthesia.

=== Light anesthesia ===
For certain operations, such as caesarean section, or in hypovolemic patients or patients with minimal cardiac reserve, the anesthesia provider may aim to provide "light anesthesia" and should discuss this with patients to warn them. During such circumstances, consciousness and recall may occur because judgments of depth of anesthesia are not precise. The anesthesia provider must weigh the need to keep the patient safe and stable with the goal of preventing awareness. Sometimes, it is necessary to provide lighter anesthesia in order to preserve the life of the patient. "Light" anesthesia means less drugs by the intravenous route or via inhalational means, leading to less cardiovascular depression (hypotension) but permitting "awareness" in the anesthetized subject.

=== Human error ===
Human errors include repeated attempts at intubation during which the short-acting anesthetic may wear off but the paralyzing drug does not; esophageal intubation; inadequate drug dose; a drug given by the wrong route or a wrong drug given; drugs given in the wrong sequence; inadequate monitoring; patient abandonment; disconnections and kinks in tubes from the ventilator; and failure to refill the anesthetic machine's vaporizers with volatile anesthetic. Other causes include unfamiliarity with techniques used, e.g. intravenous anesthetic regimes, and inexperience. Most cases of awareness are caused by inexperience and poor anesthetic technique, which can be any of the above, but also includes techniques that could be described as outside the boundaries of "normal" practice. The American Society of Anesthesiologists in 2007 released a Practice Advisory outlining the steps that anesthesia professionals and hospitals should take to minimize these risks. Other societies have released their own versions of these guidelines, including the Australian and New Zealand College of Anaesthetists.

To reduce the likelihood of awareness, anesthetists must be adequately trained, and supervised while still in training. Equipment that monitors depth of anesthesia, such as bispectral index monitoring, should not be used in isolation.

Current research attributes the incidence of AAGA to a combination of the risks mentioned above, together with ineffective practice from ODPs, anesthetic nurses, HCAs and anesthetists. The main failures include:

- Inattention or judgment errors related to drugs and volatile agents
- Termination of anesthesia too soon before surgery has finished, due to poor communication
- Lack of understanding of offset times of volatile agents
- Backflow of induction agent up a giving set
- Failure to fill vaporizers (which is the cause of 19% of the cases of AAGA)
- Under-dosing of induction agent during difficult intubation
- Failure to monitor MAC (minimum alveolar concentration of inhaled anaesthetic required to prevent movement in 50% of patients in response to surgical incision)
- Syringe swaps
- Rushing caused by organizational or individual circumstances (often associated with staff shortage and stressful work environment)
- Distractions caused by another member of staff

=== Equipment failure ===
Machine malfunction or misuse may result in an inadequate delivery of anesthetic. Many Boyle's machines in hospitals have the oxygen regulator serving as a slave to the pressure in the nitrous oxide regulator, to enable the nitrous oxide cut-off safety feature. If nitrous oxide delivery suffers due to a leak in its regulator or tubing, an 'inadequate' mixture can be delivered to the patient, causing awareness. Many World War II-vintage Boyle 'F' models are still functional and used in UK hospitals. Their emergency oxygen flush valves have a tendency to release oxygen into the breathing system, which, when added to the mixture set by the anesthesiologist, can lead to awareness. This may also be caused by an empty vaporizer (or nitrous oxide cylinder) or a malfunctioning intravenous pump or disconnection of its delivery tubing. Patient abandonment (when the anesthesiologist is no longer present) causes some cases of awareness and death.

=== Patient physiology ===
Very rare causes of awareness include drug tolerance, or a tolerance induced by the interaction of other drugs. Some patients may be more resistant to the effects of anesthetics than others; factors such as younger age, obesity, tobacco smoking, or long-term use of certain drugs (alcohol, opioids, or amphetamines) may increase the anesthetic dose needed to produce unconsciousness. There may be genetic variations that cause differences in how quickly patients clear anesthetics, and there may be differences in how the sexes react to anesthetics as well. In addition, anesthetic requirement is increased in persons with naturally red hair. Marked anxiety prior to the surgery can increase the amount of anesthesia required to prevent recall.

== Conscious sedation ==
There are various levels of consciousness. Full wakefulness and general anesthesia are the two extremes of the spectrum. Conscious sedation and monitored anesthesia care (MAC) refer to an awareness somewhere in the middle of the spectrum, depending on the degree to which a patient is sedated. Monitored anesthesia care involves titration of local anesthesia along with sedation and analgesia. Awareness/wakefulness does not necessarily imply pain or discomfort. The aim of conscious sedation or MAC is to provide a safe and comfortable anesthetic while maintaining the patient's ability to follow commands.

Under certain circumstances, a general anesthetic, whereby the patient is completely unconscious, may be unnecessary or undesirable. For instance, with a caesarean delivery, the goal is to provide comfort with neuraxial anesthetic yet maintain consciousness so that the mother can participate in the birth of the child. Other circumstances may include, but are not limited to, procedures that are minimally invasive or purely diagnostic (and thus not uncomfortable). Sometimes, the patient's health may not tolerate the stress of general anesthesia. The decision to provide MAC versus general anesthesia can be complex, involving careful consideration of individual circumstances and discussion with the patient about their preferences.

Patients who undergo conscious sedation or monitored anesthesia care are never meant to be without recall. Whether a patient remembers the procedure depends on the type of anesthetic, dosages, patient physiology, and other factors. Many patients undergoing monitored anesthesia may go through profound amnesia, depending on the amount of anesthetic used.

Some patients undergo sedation for smaller procedures such as biopsies and colonoscopies and are told they will be asleep, although in fact they are getting a sedation that may allow some level of awareness as opposed to a general anesthetic.

== Memory ==
Research into memory recall after general anesthesia aims to better understand and prevent anesthesia awareness.

Memory is currently classified under two main subsections.

- Explicit or conscious memory, which refers to the conscious recollection of previous experiences. An example of explicit memory is remembering what you did last weekend. When it comes to an anesthetized patient, a doctor may ask the patient after undergoing general anesthesia if he or she could remember hearing any distinct sounds or words while under anesthesia. This approach is called a "recall test" because patients are asked to recall any memories they had during surgery.
- Implicit memory or unconscious memory, which refers to the changes in performance or behavior that are produced by previous experiences but without any conscious recollection of those experiences. An example of this is a recognition test, where patients are asked to determine, after surgery, which of a selection of words could be heard during the surgery. The following scenario is an example. Patients were exposed during anesthesia to a list of words containing the word "pension". Postoperatively, when presented with the three-letter word stem PEN___ and asked to supply the first word that came to their minds beginning with those letters, they gave the word "pension" more often than "pencil" or "peninsula" or others.

Some researchers are now formally interviewing patients postoperatively to calculate the incidence of anesthesia awareness. It is good practice for the anesthesiologist to visit the patient after the operation and check that the patient was not aware. Most patients who were not unduly disturbed by their experiences do not necessarily report cases of awareness unless directly asked. Many who are greatly disturbed report their awareness but anesthesiologists and hospitals deny that it has happened. It has been found that some patients may not recall experiencing awareness until one to two weeks after undergoing surgery. It was also found that some patients require a more detailed interview to jog their memories for intraoperative experiences but these are only untraumatic cases. Some researchers have found that while anesthesia awareness does not commonly occur in minor surgeries, it may occur more frequently in more serious surgeries, and that it is good practice to warn of the possibility of awareness in those cases where it may be more likely.

== Prevention ==
The risk of awareness is reduced by avoidance of paralytics unless necessary; careful checking of drugs, doses and equipment; good monitoring, and careful vigilance during the case. The Isolated Forearm Technique (IFT) can be used to monitor consciousness; the technique involves applying a tourniquet to the patient's upper arm before the administration of muscle relaxants, so that the forearm can still be moved consciously. The technique is considered a reference standard by which other means of monitoring consciousness can be assessed.

Because the medical staff may not know if a person is unconscious or not, it has been suggested that the staff maintain the professional conduct that would be appropriate for a conscious patient.

== Monitors ==
Recent advances have led to the manufacture of monitors of awareness. Typically these monitor the EEG, which represents the electrical activity of the cerebral cortex, which is active when awake but quiescent under anesthesia (or in natural sleep). The monitors usually process the EEG signal down to a single number, where 100 corresponds to a patient who is fully alert, and zero corresponds to electrical silence. General anesthesia is usually signified by a number between 60 and 40 (this varies with the specific system used). There are several monitors now commercially available. These newer technologies include the bispectral index (BIS), EEG entropy monitoring, auditory evoked potentials, and several other systems such as the SNAP monitor and the Narcotrend monitor.

None of these systems are perfect. For example, they are unreliable at extremes of age (e.g., neonates, infants or the very elderly). Secondly, certain agents, such as nitrous oxide, may produce anesthesia without reducing the value of the depth monitor. This is because the molecular action of these agents (NMDA receptor antagonists) differs from that of more conventional agents, and they suppress cortical EEG activity less. Third, they are prone to interference from other biological potentials (such as EMG), or external electrical signals (such as electrosurgery). This means that the technology that will reliably monitor depth of anesthesia for every patient and every anesthetic does not yet exist. This may in part explain why a 2016 systematic review and meta analysis concluded that depth-of-anesthesia monitors had a similar effect to standard clinical monitoring on the risk of awareness during surgery.

== Incidence ==
The incidence of anesthesia awareness is variable; it seems to affect 0.2% to 0.4% of patients. This variation reflects the surgical setting as well as the physiological state of the patient; the incidence is 0.2% in general surgery, about 0.4% during caesarean section, between 1% and 2% during cardiac surgery and between 10% and 40% for anesthesia of the traumatized. The majority of these do not feel pain, although around one-third did, in a range of experience from a sore throat caused by the endotracheal tube, to traumatic pain at the incision site. The incidence is halved in the absence of neuromuscular blockade.

The quoted incidences are controversial as many cases of "awareness" are open to interpretation.

The incidence is higher and has more serious sequelae when muscle relaxants or neuromuscular-blocking drugs are used. This is because without relaxant the patient will move and the anesthesiologist will then deepen the anesthesia.

One study has indicated that this phenomenon occurs in 0.13% of patients, or between 1 and 2 per 1000. There are conflicting data, however, as another study suggested it is a rarer phenomenon, with an incidence of 0.0068%, after review of data from a population of 211,842 patients.

Postoperative interview by an anesthetist is common practice to elucidate whether awareness occurred in the case. If awareness is reported, a case review is immediately performed to identify machine, medication, or operator error.

== Outcomes ==
Patients who experience full awareness with explicit recall may have suffered an enormous trauma due to the extreme pain of surgery. Some patients experience post-traumatic stress disorder (PTSD), leading to long-lasting after-effects such as nightmares, night terrors, flashbacks, insomnia, and in some cases even suicide. Some cases of awareness alert the patient to intra-operative errors.

A study from Sweden in 2002 attempted to follow up 18 patients for approximately 2 years after having been previously diagnosed with awareness under anesthesia. Four of the nine interviewed patients were still severely disabled due to psychiatric/psychological after-effects. All of these patients had experienced anxiety during the period of awareness, but only one had stated feeling pain. Another three patients had less severe, transient mental symptoms, although they could cope with these in daily life. Two patients denied any lasting effects from their awareness episode.

== See also ==
- Awake – 2007 film about anesthetic awareness.
- 2014 Bollywood movie Heartless – the patient experienced full awareness during heart transplant.
- Carol Weihrer, an American activist who experienced intraoperative awareness with recall.
