= Jose Almeida =

Jose Almeida may refer to:

- José Joaquim Almeida (1777–1832), Portuguese-American privateer
- José Sebastião de Almeida Neto (1841–1920), Portuguese Cardinal of the Catholic Church
- José Ferraz de Almeida Júnior (1850–1899), Brazilian artist and designer
- José Simões de Almeida (sobrinho) (1880–1950), Portuguese sculptor
- José Américo de Almeida (1887–1980), Brazilian writer, politician and lawyer
- José de Almeida (1904–1988), Brazilian sprinter
- José Augusto Pinto de Almeida (born 1937), known as José Augusto, Portuguese football manager and former winger
- José Antônio Rezende de Almeida Prado (1943–2010), Portuguese composer and pianist
- José António Rondão Almeida (born 1945), Portuguese politician
- José Maria de Almeida (born 1957), Brazilian politician
- José E. Almeida (born 1961), Brazilian businessman
- Jose Almeida (footballer) (born 1979), Brazilian football striker

== See also ==
- Almeida Garrett, (João Baptista da Silva Leitão de Almeida Garrett, 1st Viscount of Almeida Garrett, 1799–1854), Portuguese poet, orator, playwright, novelist, journalist, politician, and a peer of the Realm
