= Intersect ENT =

Health care equipment company, subsidiary of Medtronic

- Company type: Subsidiary
- Traded as: Nasdaq: XENT
- Industry: Medical technology
- Founded: 2003; 23 years ago, Series A funding 2006
- Founder: Don Eaton
- Headquarters: Menlo Park, California, U.S.
- Key people: Thomas A. West (president and CEO)
- Products: PROPEL, PROPEL Mini, PROPEL Contour, SINUVA
- Revenue: ▲$115 Million (2019)
- Number of employees: 400
- Parent: Medtronic
- Website: intersectent.com

Intersect ENT, a subsidiary of Medtronic, is a health care equipment company based in Menlo Park, California. It manufactures drug-delivery devices used by Ear, Nose & Throat (ENT) clinicians in the treatment of sinusitis. Intersect ENT is best known for developing the first bioabsorbable drug-eluting sinus stent PROPEL, which delivers anti-inflammatory medication directly to the sinuses. The company holds over 20 issued patents in the United States and more than 80 patents and patent applications worldwide. The company was named on the Forbes list of America's Most Promising Companies and was also on the Fierce 15 list of Most Promising Companies in 2013.

== History ==
Intersect ENT was founded in 2003 by Don Eaton who conceived of the product over dinner with ENT surgeon, Mary Lynn Moran, MD. The company received its Series A funding in 2006, prompting the hiring of a team to develop the product. It was originally headquartered in Palo Alto, California, then moved to Menlo Park, CA in April 2012 to a new 32,000-foot facility. The facility houses all of its business and manufacturing operations.

Prior to the company becoming public, venture capital investors in the company include medical device company Medtronic Inc. and venture capital firms Kleiner Perkins Caufield & Byers, U.S. Venture Partners, PTV Sciences and Norwest Venture Partners. In 2013, it received $30 million in a series D round of financing led by Norwest Venture Partners, and included all named investors. Intersect ENT announced that the funding would be used for commercial expansion of its PROPEL and PROPEL mini devices, as well as clinical studies for additional devices manufactured to add to the company's portfolio of drug-delivery products.

In 2014, Intersect ENT went public on the NASDAQ with an offering of 5,750,000 shares of common stock. It began officially trading on July 24, 2014.

In August 2021, Medtronic announced that it would acquire Intersect for $1.1 billion. The acquisition completed in May 2022.

== Products ==
Intersect ENT develops products for Ear, Nose and Throat conditions as well as the treatment of sinusitis. Its most known device is the Propel mometasone furoate implant that is used after sinus surgery to keep the sinus passageways open and aid in the healing process by delivering an anti-inflammatory steroid directly to the sinuses. The company began clinical trials of the device in 2011 with a double-blind pilot study, and has completed three clinical studies in total. Intersect ENT received FDA pre-market approval for Propel in August 2011 and for a mini version in November 2012. In 2014, it began clinical studies for its RESOLVE device, an in-office treatment for chronic sinusitis, designed to be an alternative to surgery and oral steroid pills.
