= Awake (2007 film) =

2007 film directed by Joby Harold

- Theatrical release poster
- Directed by: Joby Harold
- Written by: Joby Harold
- Produced by: Jason Kliot; John Penotti; Joana Vicente; Fisher Stevens
- Starring: Hayden Christensen; Jessica Alba; Lena Olin; Arliss Howard; Terrence Howard
- Cinematography: Russell Carpenter
- Edited by: Craig McKay
- Music by: Graeme Revell; Samuel Sim
- Production companies: The Weinstein Company; GreeneStreet Films
- Distributed by: Metro-Goldwyn-Mayer
- Release date: November 30, 2007
- Running time: 84 minutes
- Country: United States
- Languages: English; Japanese
- Budget: $8.6 million
- Box office: $32.7 million

Awake is a 2007 American psychological thriller film written and directed by Joby Harold in his directorial debut. The film stars Hayden Christensen, Jessica Alba, Terrence Howard and Lena Olin. It follows Clay Beresford, who discovers a plot to kill him while he remains conscious but paralyzed during heart surgery.

The film was released theatrically in the United States and Canada on November 30, 2007, by Metro-Goldwyn-Mayer. It received negative reviews from critics, who criticized the performances (primarily from the leads), direction, and editing. However, it performed moderately well at the box office, grossing approximately $32.7 million worldwide against a production budget of $8.6 million.

At the 28th Golden Raspberry Awards, Alba was nominated for Worst Actress. At the same time, she and Christensen received a nomination for Worst Screen Combo.

== Plot ==
Young billionaire Clay Beresford, Jr. is in love with Samantha "Sam" Lockwood, his mother's personal assistant. Clay requires a heart transplant to be conducted by Dr. Jack Harper, Clay's heart surgeon and friend. Clay asks Dr. Harper to arrange his elopement with Sam and they marry privately at midnight, then Clay goes to the hospital for the operation.

Lilith catches Clay as he is leaving work, from her limousine. Inside, she introduces him to another heart surgeon, Dr. Jonathan Neyer. Lilith and Neyer point out his high-profile clients, including former American presidents.

Sam continues to pressure Clay to officially inform Lilith of their year-long relationship and 6-month engagement. When they do, she tells him it is too soon. Lilith threatens to cut him off, but he leaves anyway. Shortly after a private midnight wedding, which Jack helps facilitate, Clay is admitted to the hospital for the operation.

Lilith shows up at the hospital with the surgeon she wants to perform the operation. He points out Jack has an expensive life due to multiple divorces, she mentions he has four malpractice lawsuits pending. Clay and Lilith step aside to discuss it quietly, where she tries to wield her authority, but he puts his foot down.

During surgery, Clay experiences anesthesia awareness, a rare condition where he remains conscious but paralyzed. While enduring the surgical pain, he tries to distract himself with positive memories of Sam. However, his memories float to less pleasant ones.

Meanwhile, in the waiting room, when a hospital employee hits on her, Sam shows him her wedding and engagement rings. Lilith sees, asking when they had the ceremony. After she is told it was just before the call for the transplant, she falls silent.

Clay overhears Jack and his surgical team colluding to murder him, first by moving him down the donation list, then by sabotaging the transplant with a poisoned donor heart. As a result, he has an out-of-body experience and can watch detached as the conspiracy plan against him is discussed in the OR. Their plan involves injecting the heart with Adriamycin, a chemotherapy drug that would cause the transplant to fail, allowing them to collect a large life insurance payout to cover Harper’s malpractice debts. As Clay observes, then replays memories, he realises that Sam is very involved.

Jack is the mastermind, who recruited everyone. Once Clay had been brought in for heart problems over a year ago, he brought in 'Sam' who invented a persona that soon captivated Clay. He might have used nurse Penny, but she got pregnant.

As expected, as Sam had ensured the heart was unviable, it failed to start. Jack goes with the unknowing anesthesiologist to inform Lilith. As she suspects foul play, she sacrifices herself by suicide, which allows her heart to be used in place of the sabotaged donor organ.

A new surgical team, led by Dr. Neyer, intervenes and prepare Lilith’s heart for transplant while the police arrest the conspirators. Meanwhile, Sam attempts to cover her involvement, but Harper, overwhelmed by guilt, preserves evidence implicating her in the conspiracy. Dr. Neyer announces that Clay has come back to life, as the new team stitch Clay's wound. Clay, in spirit, is still in the afterlife with Lilith and tries to take his own life to stay with his mother. Clay makes his new heart stop beating and the surgeons have to use the defibrillator in attempt to revive Clay. As Clay resists being revived, Lilith forces Clay (in the "afterlife-world") to revisit a scene from his childhood, when Lilith killed Clay's abusive father. This scene reveals the truth for Clay and connects his childhood flashbacks. After seeing this, Clay gives way to revival, and before the surgeons can shock his body again, Clay allows his new heart to begin beating. Clay opens his eyes when the surgeons remove the eye tapes while Harper ends his narrating with "He is awake."

== Cast ==
- Hayden Christensen as Clay Beresford, Jr., Lilith's son
- Jessica Alba as Samantha "Sam" Lockwood-Tunnel, Lilith's personal assistant, and later Clay's wife
- Terrence Howard as Dr. Jack Harper, Clay's best friend
- Lena Olin as Lilith Beresford, Clay's mother and Sam's boss
- Nathalie Efron as Mary Beresford
- Fisher Stevens as Dr. Eugene Puttnam
- Arliss Howard as Dr. Jonathan Neyer
- Christopher McDonald as Dr. Larry Lupin
- Georgina Chapman as Nurse Penny Carver
- David Harbour as Dracula
- Sam Robards as Clay Beresford, Sr.
- Steven Hinkle as Young Clay

== Production ==
Portions of Awake were filmed at Fordham University's Lincoln Center campus in New York City. Lowenstein Hall was dressed to resemble a hospital, with the statue St. Peter: Fisher of Men visible in background shots. Additional scenes, including those set in Dr. Jack Harper's office, the cafeteria where Lilith dies by suicide, and the elevator bank, were filmed at Bellevue Hospital in Manhattan.

== Reception ==
=== Box office ===
Awake opened at number four at the U.S. box office during its opening weekend. As of March 6, 2008, the film had earned $14.4 million domestically and $32.7 million worldwide, against a production budget of approximately $8.6 million.

=== Critical response ===
The film received generally negative reviews upon release. On Rotten Tomatoes, it holds an approval rating of 23% based on 60 reviews. The website's consensus reads, " 'Awake' has an interesting premise but would have benefited from tighter performances and more efficient direction and editing." On Metacritic, the film has a score of 33 out of 100, based on 17 critics, indicating "generally unfavorable reviews". Audiences polled by CinemaScore gave the film an average grade of "C+" on an A+ to F scale.

Dennis Harvey of Variety said the film "piles on too many narrative gimmicks to maintain suspense or credibility." The Hollywood Reporter noted that director Joby Harold "succeeds in creating a quietly ominous tone that never lets up, with this being the rare modern horror effort that relies on suspense rather than bloodshed".

Roger Ebert of the Chicago Sun-Times awarded the film three out of four stars and defended the film, saying, "I did not anticipate the surprises, did not anticipate them piling on after one another, got very involved in the gory surgical details, and found the supporting soap opera good as such things go."

=== Industry response ===
A group representing anesthesiologists in Ontario criticized the film following its release for having its "science completely wrong." Ontario's Anesthesiologists, a section of the Ontario Medical Association, declared numerous scientific and procedural distortions in the film such as the presentation of improper anesthetic techniques. The group disputes the film's claim that anaesthesia awareness occurred as frequently as one in every 700 patients, although this in turn is debated by anesthesia awareness advocate Carol Weihrer.

== Accolades ==
Award	Date of the ceremony	Category	Recipients	Result	Ref.
Golden Raspberry Awards	23 February 2008	Worst Actress	Jessica Alba (also for Fantastic Four: Rise of the Silver Surfer and Good Luck Chuck)	Nominated	
Golden Raspberry Awards	23 February 2008	Worst Screen Combo	Jessica Alba and Hayden Christensen	Nominated	

== Home media ==
Awake was released on DVD in the United States on March 4, 2008. The Blu-ray edition followed on November 18, 2008.
