= FCN =

FCN may refer to:

== Sport ==
- FC Nantes
- FC Nordsjælland
- FC Nöttingen
- 1. FC Nürnberg
- FC Nenzing

== Transport ==
- Falconwood railway station (National Rail station code), in London
- Fort Canning MRT station (MRT station abbreviation), in Singapore
- Sea-Airport Cuxhaven/Nordholz (IATA code), in Nordholz, Germany

== Other uses ==
- Faith community nursing
- Federal Center of Neurosurgery (Tyumen), in Russia
- Federal Convention of Namibia
- Federation of Canadian Naturists
- Ficolin
- Free Charging Network
- FTI Consulting, an American professional services company
- Function (mathematics)
- National Convergence Front (Spanish: Frente de Convergencia Nacional), a political party in Guatemala
- the chemical compound Cyanogen fluoride
