= Bill Bowes (venture capitalist) =

American philanthropist (1926–2016)

Bill Bowes (July 5, 1926 – December 28, 2016) was a venture capitalist, philanthropist, and co-founder of U.S. Venture Partners. He co-founded U.S. Venture Partners in 1981.

== Early life and education ==
Bowes was born in 1926 in San Francisco. He graduated from Lowell High School in 1942. He has a B.A. in Economics from Stanford University, an M.B.A. from Harvard University.

== Career ==
Bowes worked with the investment bank Blyth & Co. Inc. He was also involved with Cetus, a biotechnology company and was a member of its board from 1972 to 1978.

He was the founding shareholder, first Treasurer and Chairman of Amgen. He also invested in Leroy Hood's protein sequencer, and served on the board of directors for Raychem from 1961 until the late 1970s. Bowes is also the founding partner at U.S. Venture Partners.

== Philanthropy ==
Bowes contributed to the Harvard Stem Cell Institute and also served on the advisory committee for the Harvard Partners Center for Genetics and Genomics. He also donated to UCSF, specifically to the basic science, stem cell research, holistic and alternative medicine, junior faculty support, and neurology programs.
