= Zephyr Technology =

Zephyr Technology Corporation
- Company type: Private
- Industry: Remote physiological monitoring, telehealth, Heart rate monitor Sports physiology, Military
- Founded: 2003, New Zealand
- Headquarters: Annapolis, MD, United States
- Key people: Brian Russell (Founder & CEO)
- Products: ZephyrLIFE; BioHarness 3; HxM BT; HxM Smart; PSM Training ECHO
- Website: www.zephyranywhere.com

Zephyr Technology Corporation, (also known as Zephyr) is a privately owned manufacturer of advanced heart rate monitors, remote physiological monitoring and wireless telehealth systems for remote patient monitoring.

Based in Annapolis, Maryland and founded in 2003, Zephyr developed one of the first commercially available wearable, wireless and field-deployable Physiological Status Monitoring (PSM) systems for use in training and high stress operational environments.

The company now has research and development resources in the United States, New Zealand and India, along with 31 distributors in more than 40 countries globally. Zephyr manufactures a range of consumer and professional-grade heart rate and fitness monitoring devices capable of measuring heart rate, respiration, heart rate variability, activity level, and 3-axis accelerometry. Zephyr most recent product, ZephyrLIFE, is one of the first entries into the emerging home telehealth and remote patient monitoring market.

== History ==
In 2003, Zephyr was founded in New Zealand to help develop remote monitoring technologies to address the needs of coaches and athletes in their training. Zephyr's engineers learned early on that there were particular challenges that such systems faced - many of which were the same as those faced by first responders and military personnel.

Early and ongoing collaboration with fire departments, NASA Ames Research Center, National Guard Civil Support Teams, and multiple U.S. Special Forces units have allow Zephyr to develop its BioHarness and OmniSense software, which are capable of monitoring up to 50 test subjects at ranges of up to 1000 ft.

In 2010, Zephyr's BioHarness and OmniSense system were used to remotely monitor the health and medical status of miners trapped during the 2010 Copiapó mining accident near Copiapó, Chile.

In 2011, Under Armour partnered with Zephyr to monitor athletes during the 2011 NFL Scouting Combine.

In 2012, Zephyr testified to United States Congress on behalf of NASA.

In 2013, Zephyr has partnered with organizations including Massachusetts General Hospital, the National Institutes of Health, Qualcomm, Verizon Wireless, and 3M to develop and launch ZephyrLIFE - one of the first commercially available comprehensive remote patient monitoring systems for general care monitoring.

In 2014, Covidien (ex Tyco Health) purchased Zephyr. Zephyr has continued to sell products in its three areas of consumer, Pro Sports, Defense and Healthcare.

In Feb 2015, Medtronic (ticker MDT) purchased Covidien forming the largest medical device company in the world. The acquisition was valued at $42.9 billion in cash and stock.
