= Somanetics =

United States based provider of medical devices

- Industry: Medical equipment
- Founded: 1982; 43 years ago
- Founder: Gary Lewis
- Fate: Merged with Medtronic
- Headquarters: Troy, Michigan
- Parent: Medtronic

Somanetics was a medical device company founded in 1982 then acquired in 2010 by Covidien. The company pioneered the INVOS technology used to measure level of blood oxygenation for patients undergoing surgical procedures. After a series of acquisitions, the company's brand name and assets are currently owned by Medtronic, which still produces INVOS-branded sensors and monitors.

== History ==
Somanetics was founded in 1982 by Gary Lewis to market monitoring technology that could detect blood oxygenation levels in the cranium, arms, and legs. Lewis raised $150,000 from friends and family to launch the company, before turning to venture capitalists for additional funding. This technology was marketed under the name "INVOS", an abbreviation for In Vivo Optical Spectroscopy. The company's stock was traded on the NASDAQ market under the stock symbol SMTS.

In March of 1991, Somanetics held an initial public offering and raised $4.5 million in investment funding.

In May of 1993, Somanetics began marketing the INVOS 3100 after receiving FDA (Food and Drug Administration) approval. In November of 1993, the FDA revoked the marketing license for the INVOS 3100 due to concerns about the clinical trial data submitted in the 510(k).

In 1996, Somanetics received approval from the FDA to market the INVOS 3100A system in the United States.

In 2000, Somanetics received approval from the FDA to market the INVOS 5100 system in the United States.

In 2006, Somanetics received approval from the FDA to expand use of the INVOS monitor from the cranium to other parts of the body.

In 2008, Somanetics acquired a company called ICU Data Systems, based out of Gainesville, Florida for $2 million. ICU Data Systems had a patented design for a bedside monitor named "Vital Sync" that could integrate data from other medical devices, such as ventilators and infusion pumps. That year, Somanetics also received FDA approval to market the INVOS 5100C system in the United States.

As of 2009, the INVOS monitoring system was being used in 700 hospitals in the United States and 1200 hospitals outside of the United States.

In May of 2010, Somanetics received FDA approval to expand features on the Vital Sync monitor, allowing the device to interface with a more types of medical devices, display of derived parameters, and mechanism to alert clinicians when parameter measurements exceeded configured thresholds.

In 2010, Somanetics agreed to be acquired by Covidien for $250 million.Later that year, Somanetics announced that it would close its Michigan and Florida operations as part of its acquisition by Covidien.

In 2015, Medtronic acquired Covidien and inherited all brands, including INVOS.

As of 2025, Medtronic is still producing INVOS sensor and monitor products for the healthcare industry.
