= Aspect Medical Systems =

United States based provider of brain monitoring products

- Industry: Medical equipment
- Founded: 1987; 39 years ago
- Founder: Nassib G. Chamoun
- Fate: Merged with Medtronic
- Headquarters: Newton, Massachusetts
- Parent: Medtronic

Aspect Medical Systems was a medical devices company founded in 1987 then acquired in 2009 by Covidien. The company pioneered the use of brain monitoring to measure level of consciousness for anesthesia patients in the operating room. After a series of acquisitions, the company's brand name and assets are currently owned by Medtronic, which still produces BIS-branded sensors and monitors.

== History ==
Aspect Medical Systems was founded in 1987 by Nassib G. Chamoun.

In October 1996, the FDA cleared the Bispectral Index (BIS) for marketing for use as a direct measure of the effects of anesthetics and sedatives on the brain.

In 1998, the company opened their international headquarters in The Netherlands.

Aspect Medical Systems had their initial public offering on January 28, 2000, and their stock was traded on the NASDAQ using the symbol ASPM.

In 2000, the company began a three-year long series of clinical trials, involving over 30,000 patients.

In October 2003, the FDA cleared a new indication for use specifying that use of BIS monitoring to help guide anesthetic administration may be associated with the reduction of the incidence of awareness with recall in adults during general anesthesia and sedation.

As of December 31, 2003, the worldwide installed base of BIS monitors and modules was approximately 19,500 units.

In 2009, Covidien acquired Aspect Medical Systems for $210 million.

In 2015, Medtronic acquired Covidien and inherited all brands, including BIS.

As of 2025, Medtronic is still producing BIS sensor and monitor products for the healthcare industry.

== Products ==
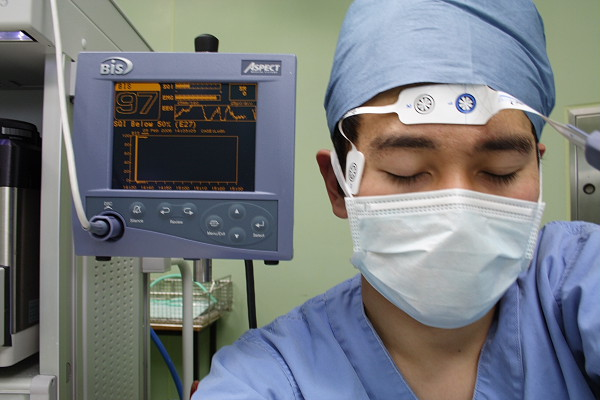
BIS monitor

=== A-2000 ===
The A-2000 BIS Monitor, was cleared for marketing by the FDA in February 1998.

=== BIS XP ===
The BIS XP system was cleared for marketing by the FDA in June 2001. The BIS XP system offered more precise measurement of brain activity to assess the level of consciousness. The BIS XP system was designed to detect and filter interference from muscle artifact and is resistant to interference from electrocautery devices. Additionally, it is able to provide enhanced detection of near suppression, a brain wave pattern occasionally observed during deep anesthesia and cardiac cases.

=== BISx ===
In February 2004 the BISx was cleared for marketing by the FDA. The BISx system was designed as an original equipment manufacturer (OEM) BIS monitoring solution that provided the BIS XP functionality in a single device the size of a hockey puck, allowing the incorporation of BIS into third-party patient monitoring systems.

=== BIS VISTA ===
In 2007, the BIS VISTA monitor was cleared for marketing by the FDA. The BIS VISTA monitor acted as a replacement for the older BIS XP monitor and featured a full color display.

=== BIS VIEW ===
In 2007, the BIS VIEW monitor was cleared for marketing by the FDA. The BIS VIEW was created to service lower acuity settings, with less features than the BIS VISTA.

=== BIS Advance ===
In 2024, the BIS Advance monitor was cleared for marketing by the FDA. This product was released by Medtronic as a replacement for the BIS VISTA monitor.

== OEM partnerships ==
Aspect Medical Systems also sells OEM BIS modules to third party patient monitor manufacturers, so they can incorporate BIS technology into their devices. OEM partner companies have included GE Healthcare, Datex-Ohmeda, Philips, and Nihon Kohden.

== See also ==
- Bispectral index
