= Covidien =

Irish registered healthcare products company

Covidien plc
- Company type: Subsidiary
- Industry: Medical equipment
- Founded: 2007
- Defunct: 2015
- Fate: Acquired by Medtronic
- Headquarters: Dublin, Ireland
- Area served: Worldwide
- Key people: José E. Almeida (CEO); Bryan Hanson (EVP and President, Covidien Group)
- Products: Medical devices Surgical supplies Medical supplies
- Number of employees: 39,000 (2014)
- Website: covidien.com at the Wayback Machine (archived 2014-02-03)

Covidien plc was an Irish multinational healthcare products and medical device manufacturer. Covidien became publicly traded after being spun off from Tyco International in 2007. It was purchased by Medtronic in 2015. The now-merged company is headquartered in Ireland, where Covidien was based.

== History ==
In 2007, Covidien was formed when Tyco International spun off its health care business.

In 2009, Covidien acquired Aspect Medical Systems, a manufacturer of brain monitoring sensors and monitors for $210 million.

in 2010, Covidien acquired Somanetics, a manufacturer of INVOS regional saturation monitors for $250 million.

Newport Medical Instruments, a modest ventilator provider and manufacturer, was purchased by Covidien in 2012. Newport Medical Instruments had been contracted in 2006 by the U.S. Department of Health and Human Services' Biomedical Advanced Research and Development Authority to design a cheap, portable ventilator. At the time, Newport Medical Instruments had three working prototypes produced, and was on schedule to file for market approval late 2013. Covidien then effectively halted the project, subsequently exiting the contract, citing the reason that it was not profitable enough due to significant design faults which had to be corrected with extensive redesign with minimal impact to regulatory requirements. Government officials and other medical equipment suppliers suspected that the Newport acquisition was largely done to prevent a cheaper product from undermining Covidien's existing ventilator business. This contributed to the shortage of ventilators during the COVID-19 pandemic.

In October 2013, Covidien sold its Confluent Surgical product line for $235 million to Integra LifeSciences, including its DuraSeal, VascuSeal and SprayShield products.

In January 2014, Covidien acquired WEM Electronic Equipment, based in Ribeirão Preto, Brazil.

In May 2014, Covidien acquired Zephyr Technology, a maker of wearable sensors and monitoring systems for an undisclosed amount.

In June 2014, Covidien agreed to be acquired by Medtronic for $42.9 billion.
