= U.S. Venture Partners =

American venture capital investment firm

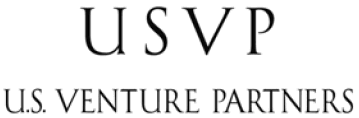
- Industry: Venture Capital
- Founded: 1981
- Headquarters: Menlo Park, California, U.S.
- Products: Investments
- Website: usvp.com

U.S. Venture Partners (USVP) is a venture capital investment firm specializing in early-stage ventures in enterprise software, cybersecurity, consumer, e-commerce, healthcare, and IT-enabled healthcare services. The venture capital partnership is headquartered in Menlo Park, California. Since its inception in 1981, USVP has invested over $4.3 billion across a wide range of sectors. Out of the 524 companies financed by USVP, 93 have completed an initial public offering.

== History ==
U.S. Venture Partners was founded by Bill Bowes, Stuart Moldaw, and Robert Sackman in 1981.

As of 2022, the firm was investing out of its thirteenth fund, USVP XIII. Composed of former venture investors, entrepreneurs, CEOs, technologists, corporate executives, financial professionals, and industry domain experts, USVP has a combined 150 years of investment and operating experience with backgrounds across a wide array of sectors. The investment team is composed of Jacques Benkoski, Steve Krausz, Rick Lewis, Jonathan Root, Casey Tansey and Dafina Toncheva.

The firm makes investments between $5 million and $10 million in markets with revenue potential exceeding $1 billion. USVP prefers to invest in companies with a market greater than $300 million and avoids companies in direct competition with each other. On average, USVP will invest for a period of three to ten years.

== Investments ==
The firm has invested across multiple sectors over the years and is focused on enterprise software, IT security, consumer internet, mobile, e-commerce, healthcare, and IT-enabled healthcare services.

The firm's recent investments include Arkose Labs, Box, Carrot Fertility, Cato Networks, Happy Returns, HeartFlow, HotelTonight, Human Interest, Inari Medical, Inspire Medical Systems, Intersect ENT, Medigate, Omada Health, Pluto TV, ThreatMetrix, and Zerto.

Notable historical investments include: Sun Microsystems, Callaway Golf, St. Francis Medical, SanDisk, Ross Stores, Ask Jeeves, Adify, PetSmart, Check Point, Mellanox, Vontu, Proteolix, Dotomi, Imperva, Guidewire Software, Yammer, Trusteer, Nanostim and Trunk Club.
