= Carol Weihrer =

American anesthesia awareness activist

- Born: August 21, 1951
- Died: April 27, 2024 (aged 72)
- Years active: 1998-2024
- Known for: Anesthesia awareness activism

Carol Weihrer (August 21, 1951 - April 27, 2024) was an activist for victims of anesthesia awareness. Beginning in 1989, Weihrer had chronic pain from recurrent corneal erosion syndrome. After 14 unsuccessful surgeries to relieve the increasing severity of the pain, in 1998 she underwent an enucleation of the eye and reportedly woke up from anesthesia during the procedure. Although she didn't feel any pain during the surgery, she remembered the entire experience afterwards. Weihrer received an out-of-court settlement and maintained that she had post-traumatic stress disorder as result of her experience.

Weihrer died on April 27, 2024.
