= Entropy monitoring =

- Specialty: Anaesthesiology
- Uses: Monitoring depth of anaesthesia
- [edit on Wikidata]

Entropy monitoring is a method of assessing the effect of certain anaesthetic drugs on the brain's EEG. It was commercially developed by Datex-Ohmeda, which is now part of GE Healthcare.

The Entropy monitor is a quantitative EEG device which captures a single-lead frontal EEG via a 3-electrode sensor applied to the patient's forehead. The system calculates the "spectral entropy" of the electroencephalogram (EEG) signals, which is a measure of the degree that the power spectrum is uniform. Increasing brain levels of anaesthetic drugs causes the predominant frequencies in the EEG to be lower than when awake, and this is reflected in a decrease in the spectral entropy.

Entropy monitors generate two numbers that are derived from different frequency bands used. The State Entropy (SE) is calculated from the 0.8 Hz to 32 Hz range, whereas the Response Entropy (RE) uses frequencies up to 47 Hz. Electromyogram activity is more predominant in those higher frequencies, and so the Response Entropy may respond more quickly when muscle activity is present.

Published studies show that Entropy values do relate to clinical levels of anaesthetic depth. Most of the commonly used anaesthetic drugs are detectable by Entropy monitoring, a notable exception being nitrous oxide, in common with BIS monitoring.

Other vital signs such as pulse, heart rate, blood pressure, and movement are indirect indicators of consciousness, but are unreliable. When these are combined with expired gas analysis of inhalational anaesthetic agents, an experienced anaesthetist can be confident a patient is unconscious and not aware of their surroundings. However, the direct measurement of brain activity using a basic EEG is purported to measure effects of anaesthetics more comprehensively. Unlike the bispectral index monitor, some aspects of the algorithm of the Entropy monitor have been described by the developers.

== See also ==
- Bispectral index
- Evoked potentials
- Spectral flatness
