= José E. Almeida =

Brazilian businessman

José E. Almeida (born 1961 or 1962) is a Brazilian businessman. He served as the chairman and CEO of Baxter International, Inc. from January 2016 to February 2025. He also serves on the board of directors of the Advanced Medical Technology Association (AdvaMed) and Partners in Health, and he is a member of Business Roundtable.

== Career ==
Almeida worked for Tyco Healthcare from 1995 to 2002. He was president of Medical Devices division from October 2006 to June 2011. He served as chairman of the board of directors of Covidien since March 2012 and as the president, chief executive officer and a director since July 2011. In 2015, he worked for The Carlyle Group as an Operating Executive in the Global Healthcare group. He became a director of EMC Corporation on Jan 12, 2015 and resigned on October 30, 2015, due to his election as chairman and CEO of Baxter International.

In 2023, Almeida's total compensation at Baxter International was $13.8 million.

== Education ==
A native of Brazil, Almeida received a Bachelor of Science in mechanical engineering from Instituto Mauá de Tecnologia in São Paulo.
