= Federal Center of Neurosurgery (Tyumen) =

- Ministry of Health of the Russian Federation

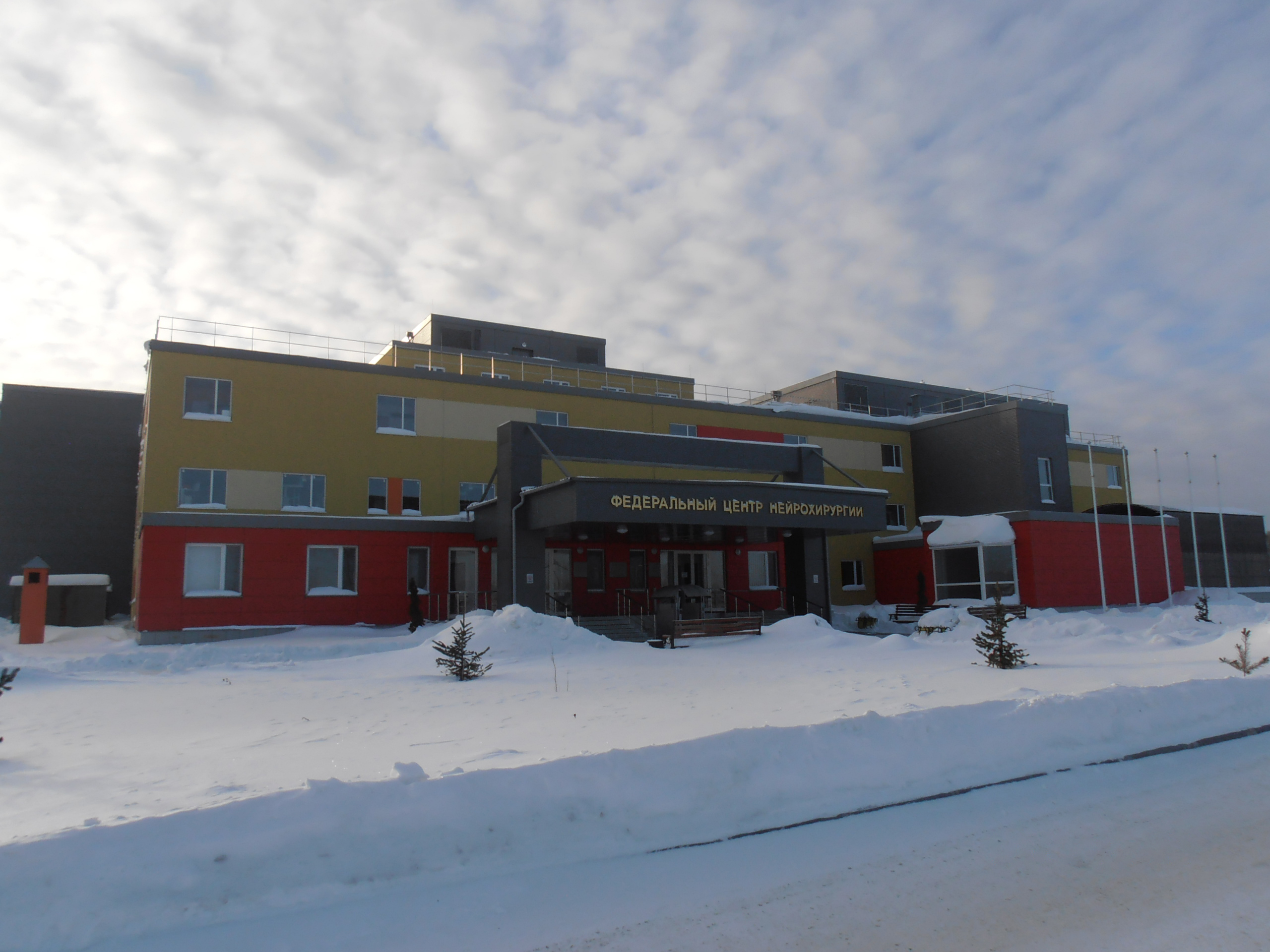

- Location within Russia

Geography
- Location: Tyumen, Tyumen Oblast, Russia
- Coordinates: 57°6′16″N 65°32′29″E

Organisation
- Care system: Public Medicare (Russia)
- Type: Specialist
- Patron: Albert Sufianov

Services
- Beds: 95
- Speciality: Neurosurgery hospital

Helipads
- Helipad: Roshchino International Airport (IATA: TJM, ICAO: USTR)

History
- Founded: 2011

Links
- Website: http://www.new.fcn-tmn.ru/

The Federal Center of Neurosurgery in Tyumen (Russian: Федеральный центр нейрохирургии в Тюмени), the full official name is the Federal State budgetary institution the Federal Center of Neurosurgery of the Ministry of Health of the Russian Federation (Tyumen) — the medical institution built for high-tech neurosurgery health care. The target group of the hospital is the Ural Federal District inhabitants. The distinguishing feature of the institution is minimally invasive surgery.

The center was opened in 2011, under the auspices of the National Priority Project «Public Health». In 2012 it ranks in the 2nd place for neurosurgery operations within Russia after the Burdenko Neurosurgery Institute in Moscow.

== History ==
Under the auspices of the National Priority Project «Public Health» started in 2006, it was planned to build 7 federal medical centers of high technologies in Russian regions and also the Federal Research and Surgery Center of Children's hematology, oncology and immunology in Moscow (by the order of the Government of the Russian Federation of March 20, 2006 No.139). Then the number of such institutions increased to 14, two of them was planned for the neurosurgery direction (in Tyumen and Novosibirsk).

The Tyumen center was the first of the neurosurgery and the seventh of the general ticket of the federal centers. The so-called «medical camp», near the village of Patrusheva was picked out for the building site. There was also the surgical campus of the Tyumen regional hospital and the medical unit «Neftyanik». In addition, in 2012 there was built the Radiological center of the Tyumen regional oncological clinic. Also it is planned to construct new academic building of the Tyumen State medical academy, the anatomical center and also the main campus of the regional oncological clinic.

The construction of the Tyumen center started in 2008. The first surgery was held at the April 25, 2011. In 2011 the clinic was allocated with 330 surgery quotas within the government procurement, in 2012 – 3,000 quotas.

In December, 2012 the first surgery was held in the Federal Center of Neurosurgery in Novosibirsk.

== Structure ==
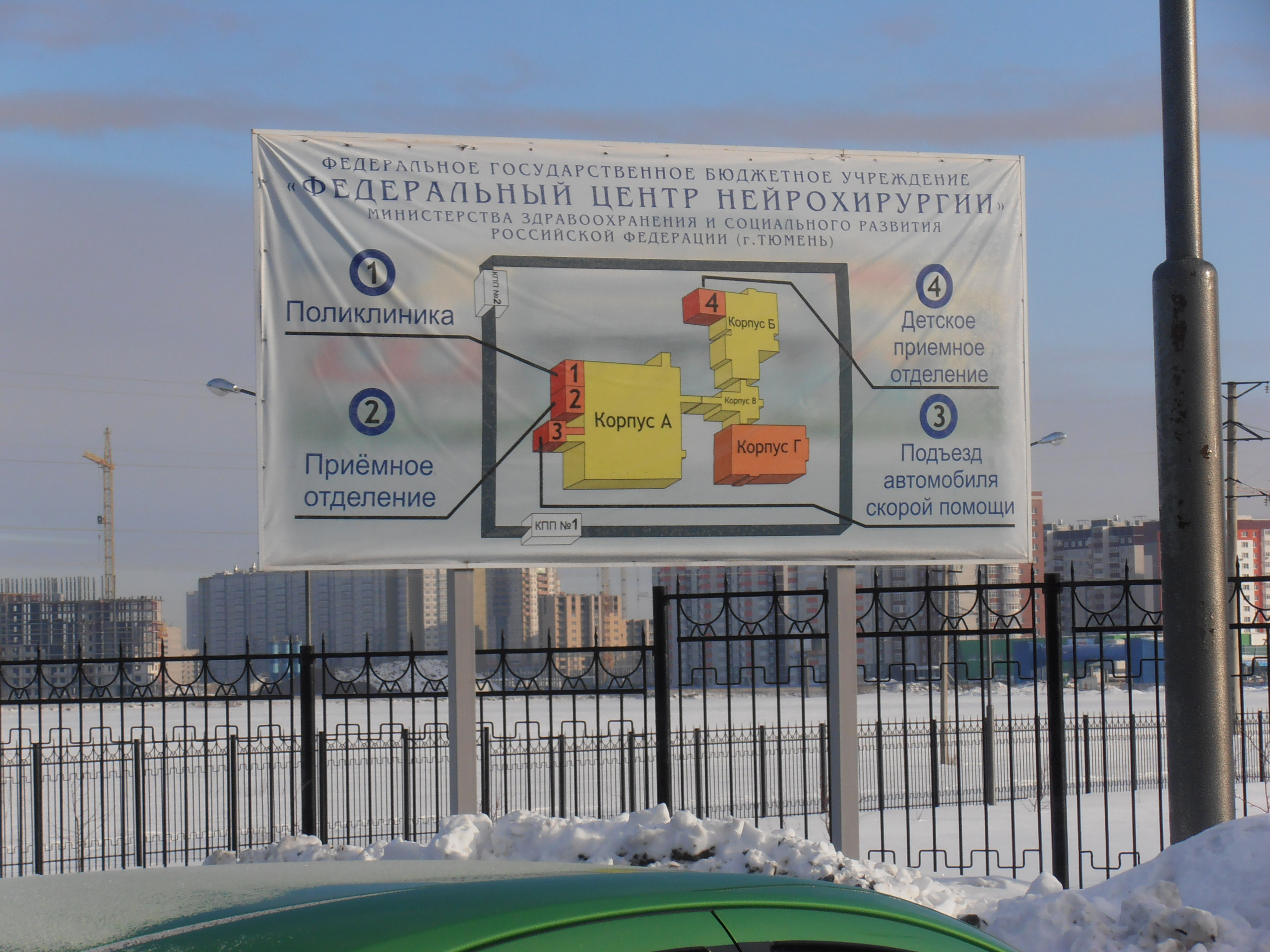
Scheme of the Center, 2013

The hospital consists of five specialized units: for adults (neurovascular, vertebrological, the neuro-oncology unit, functional neurosurgery), with 20 beds per each unit and for children, with 15 beds.

Besides, there is the admission office counted for 80 visits per turn.

The subsidiary units: the medical ultrasonography department, the operating suite, the department of perioperative medicine and life support.

== Provided health care ==
The medical care provided by the hospital with concern of the 34th Article of the Federal Law of the 21st of November, 2011 No. 323 «About the basics of the health protection of the Russian Federation citizens». The medical care for the citizens of the Russian Federation is provided within the government procurement, for free, regardless of the region of residence. The patients may get the medical care via the appointments of the regional medical departments and also via the own admission office of the center.

The clinic provides treatment of such diseases as:

- arterial aneurysms
- arteriovenous malformations
- Parkinson's disease
- hemifacial spasm
- hydrocephalus (adults and children)
- cerebral palsy
- spina bifida
- craniosynostosis
- spinal disc herniation
- neuralgia of occipital nerves
- neuropathic pain
- choroid plexus papilloma
- CNS tumours
- degenerative spine disease
- newborns’ perinatal pathologies
- spinal fracture and after-effects
- posttraumatic, postapoplectic spastic and pain syndromes
- Dandy–Walker syndrome
- stenosis of different genesis
- torsion dystonia
- epilepsy
- essential tremor

Statistically, 80% of the patients make complete recovery, 15% keep curing with medicaments. Due to the minimally invasive surgery methods, the tissues intrusion is minimal. It helps to discharge the majority of the patients from a hospital already through 3–5 days after surgery.

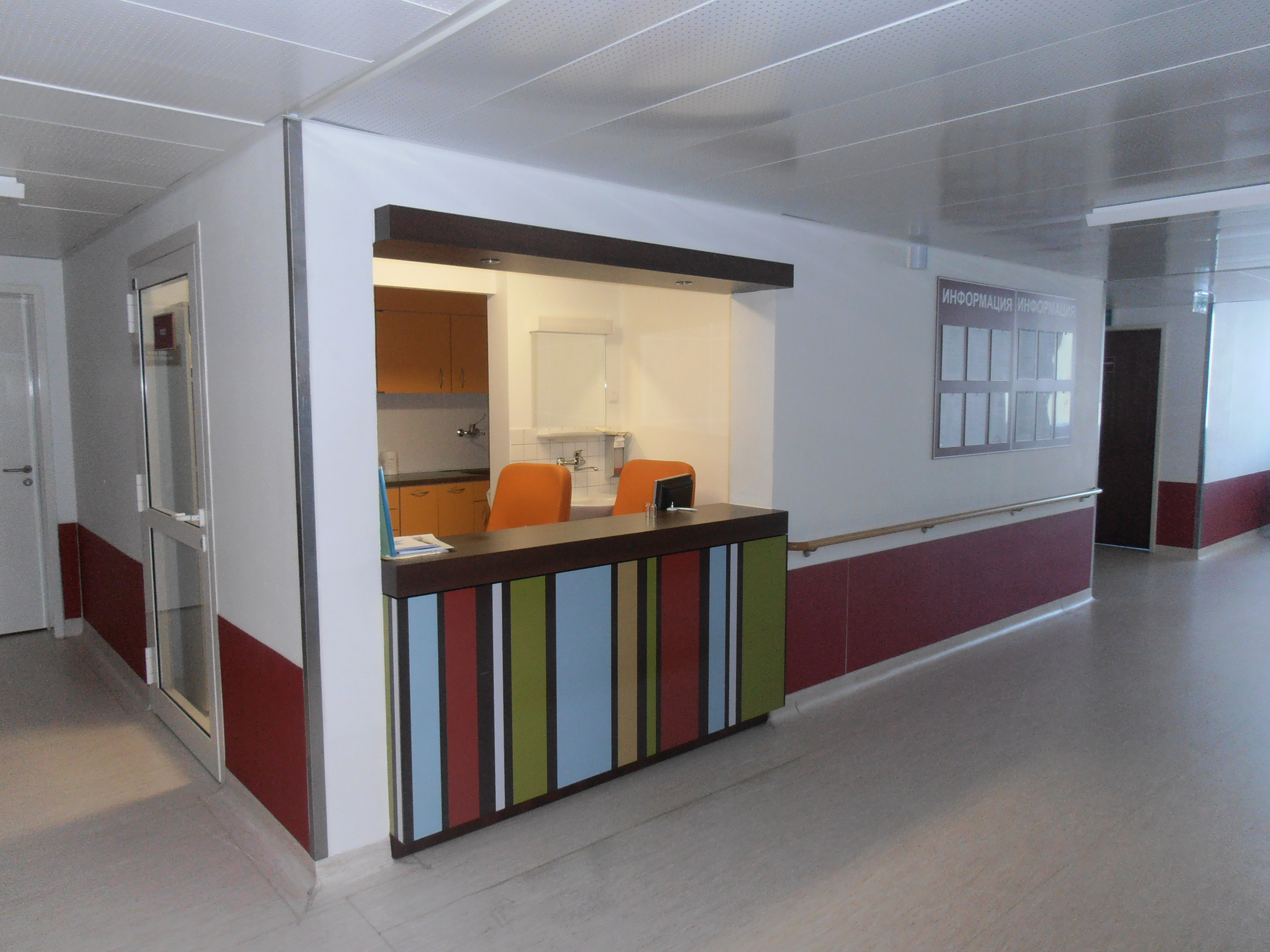

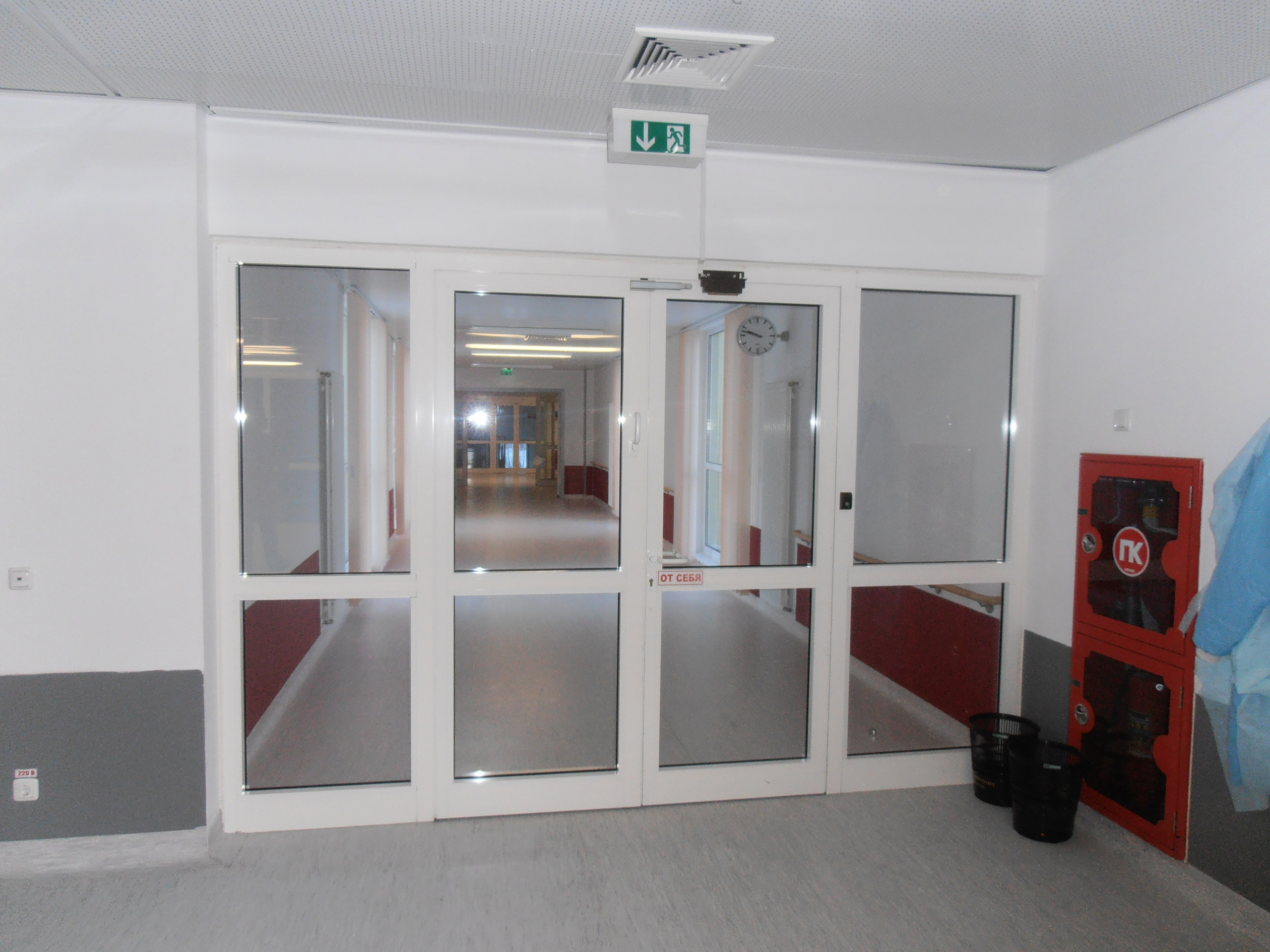

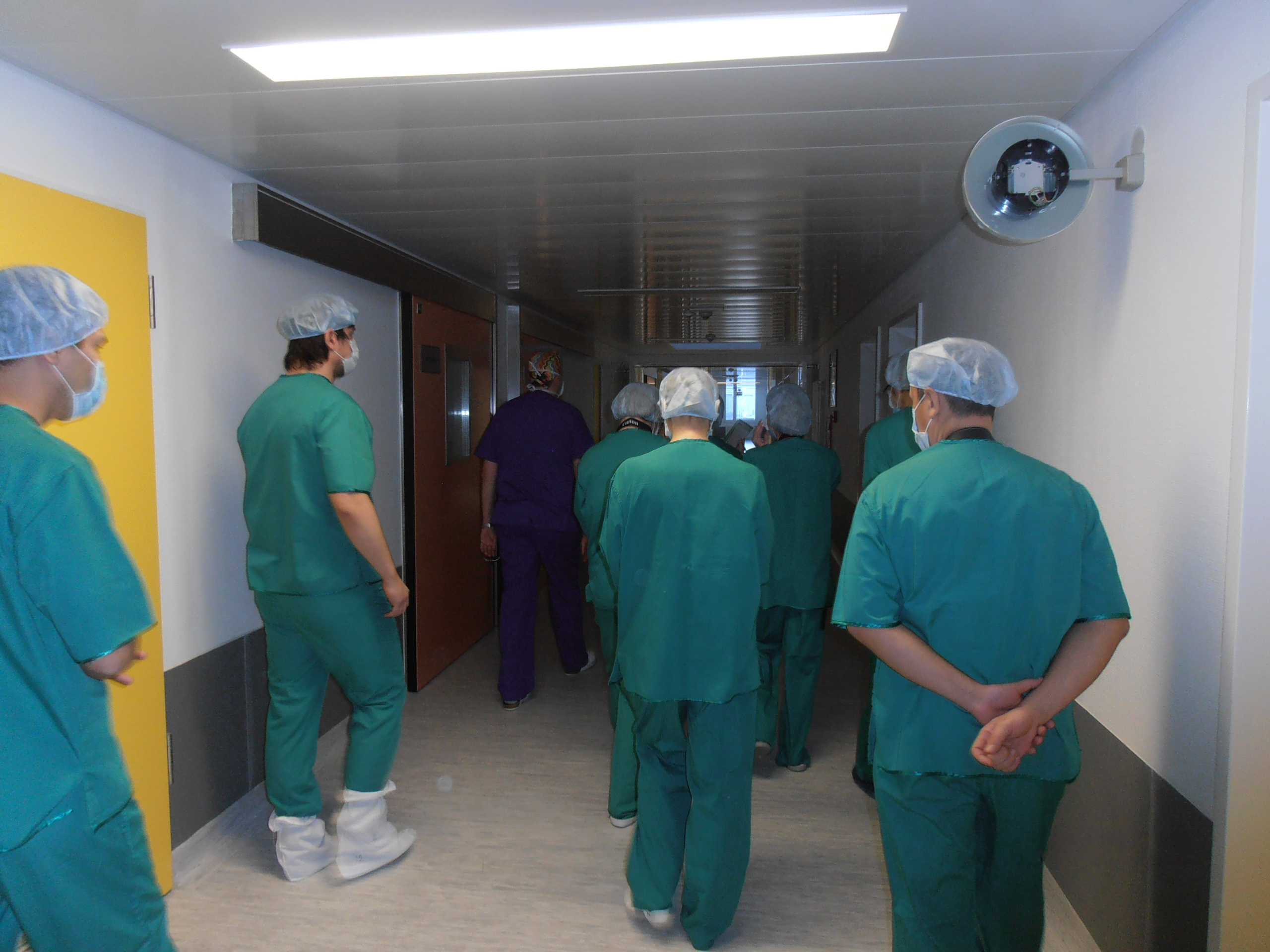

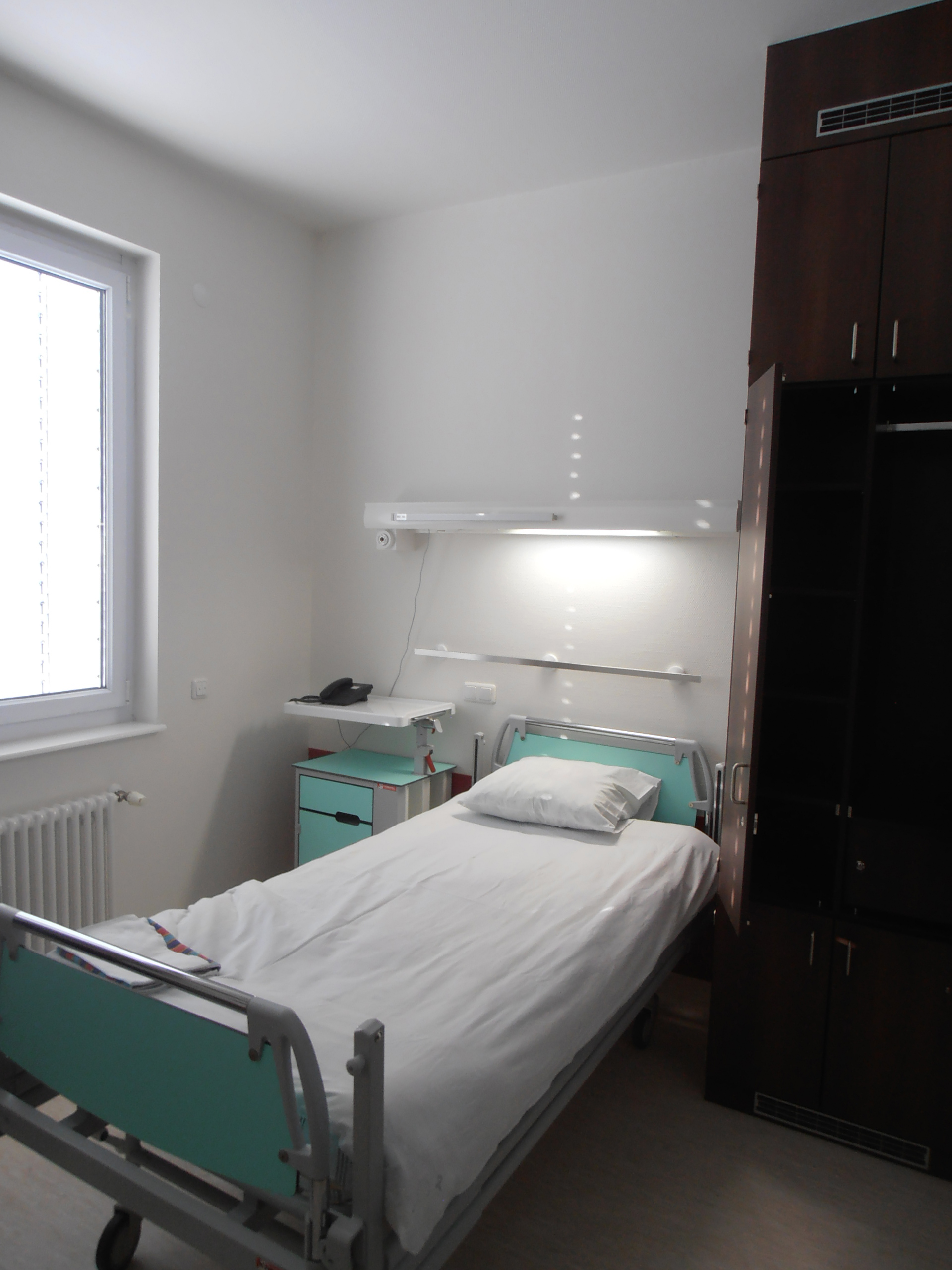

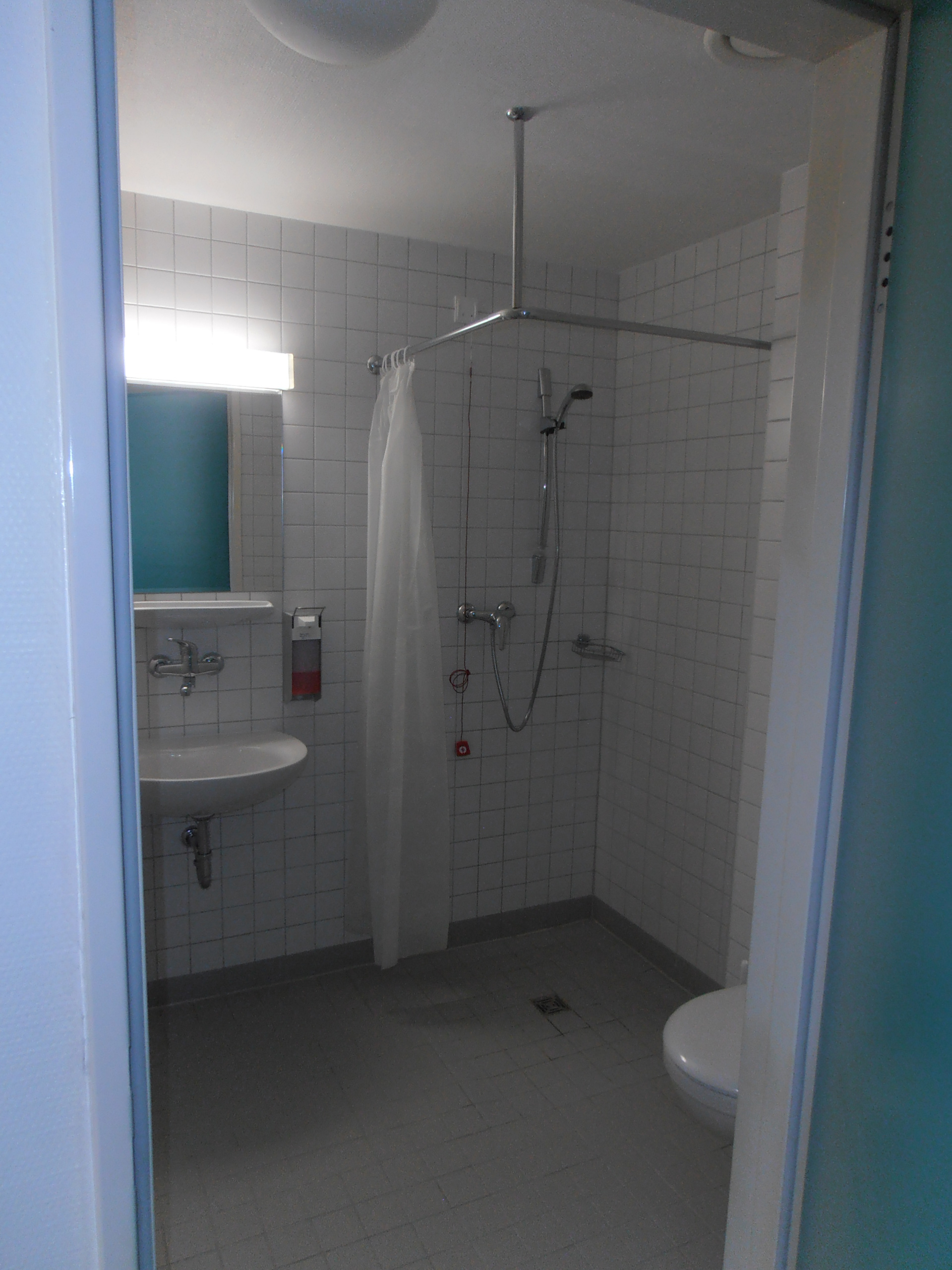

== Applied technologies ==
The center provides a number of advanced technologies. So, the venous vacuum blood sampling used in the children's department reduces the discomfort and the infection risks. The vertebrological department provides the endoscopic elimination of intervertebral disk hernia. The technology provided by the German company JOIMAX makes it possible to maintain a surgery without the use of general anaesthesia. The oncology department explores the Norwegian system of dynamic 3D neuronavigation SonoWand. The intraoperative neuromonitor ISIS IOM of the German company Inomed Medizintechnik applied in the functional neurosurgery department helps to conduct the chips-stimulators implantation which are used for the vagus nerve stimulation. The patients can turn off the painful sensation at any point using remote control.

The minimally invasive surgery is provided due to the mobile tomographic microscope O-arm ® Surgical Imaging System of the American company Medtronic. It is necessary to notice that the surgery is equipped by a telemedicine system which allows the surgeons to get the consultations in real time mode from any specialists all over the world.

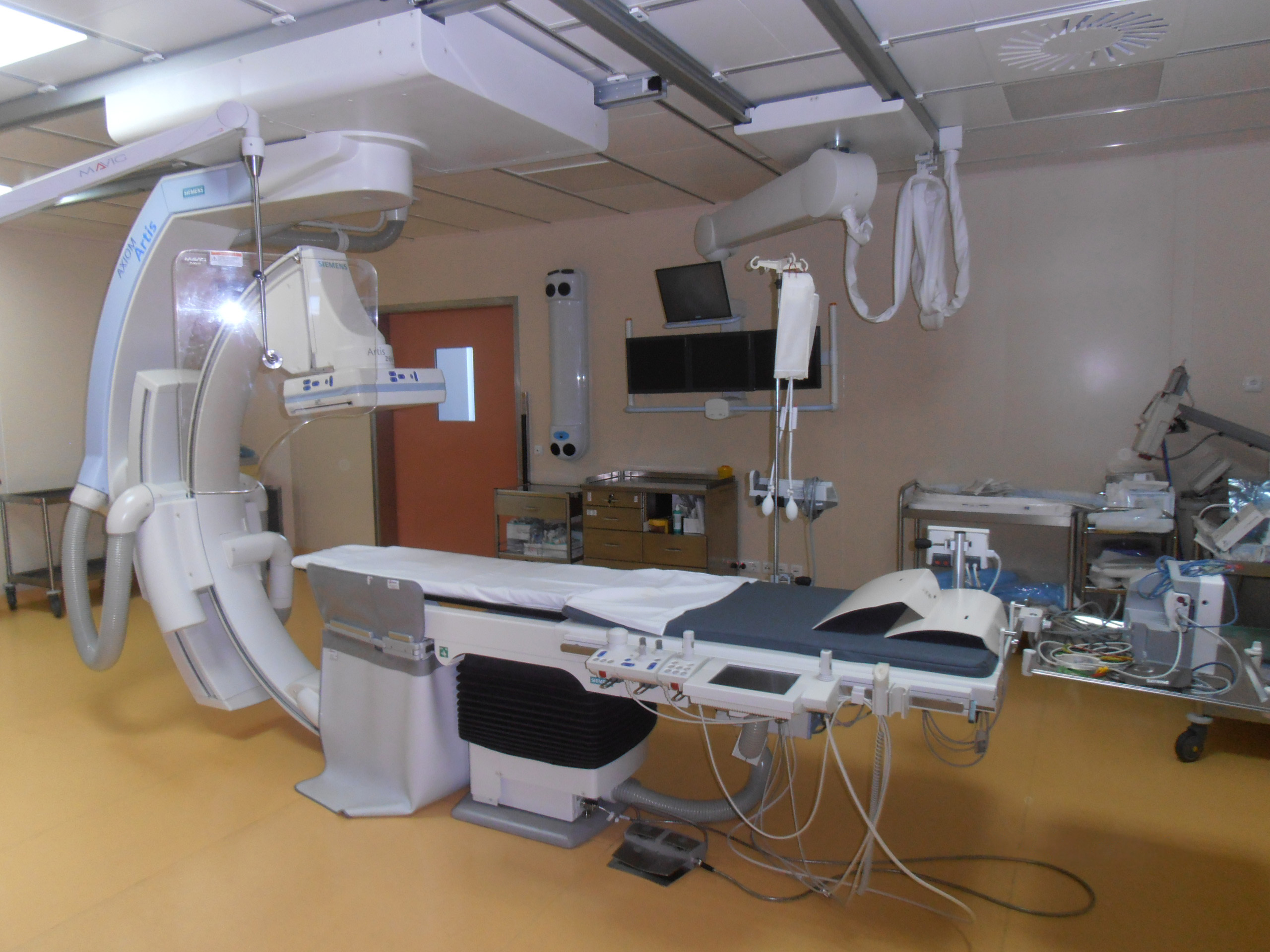
Endoscopy operating room

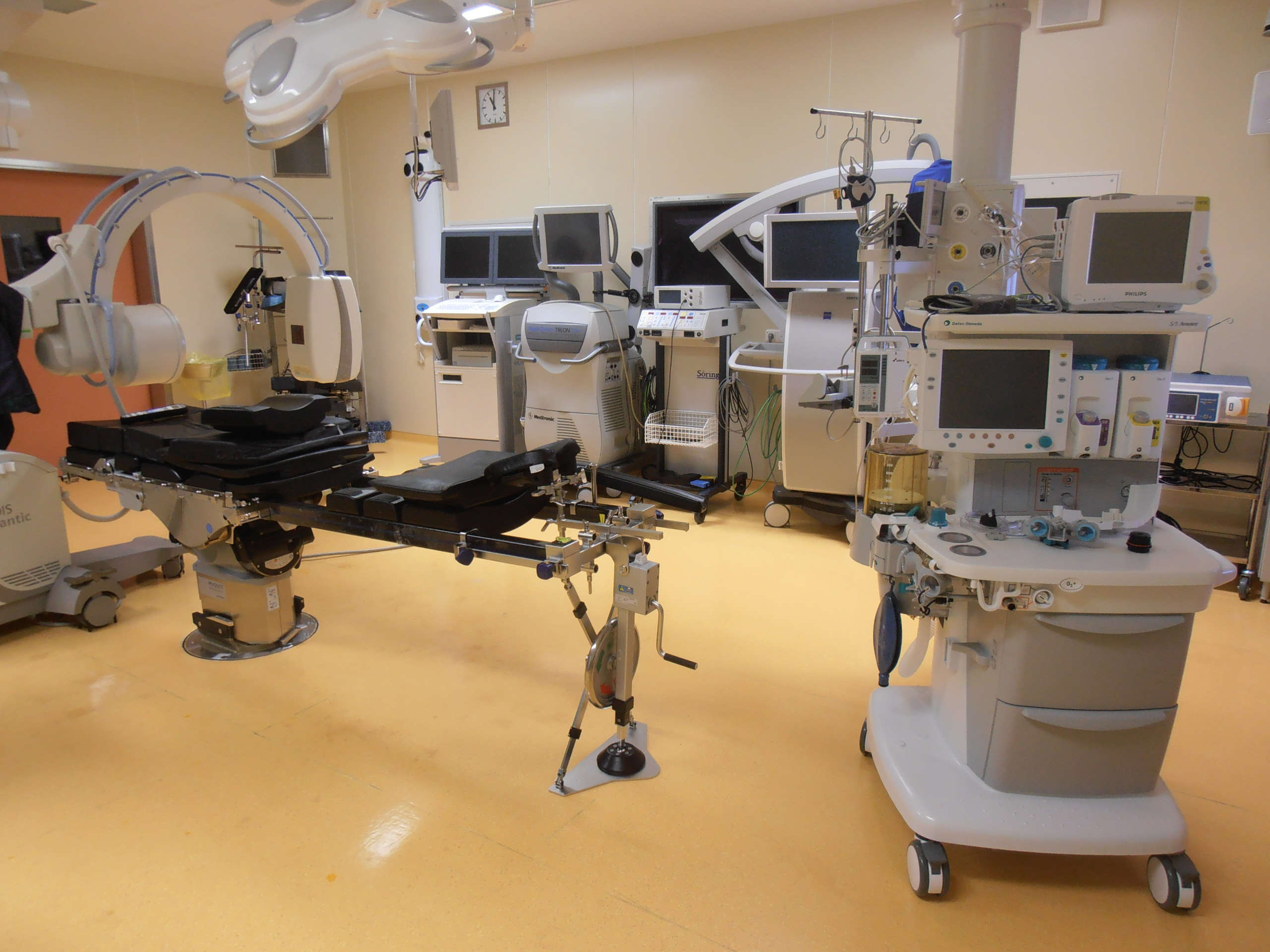
Neuronavigator SonoWand

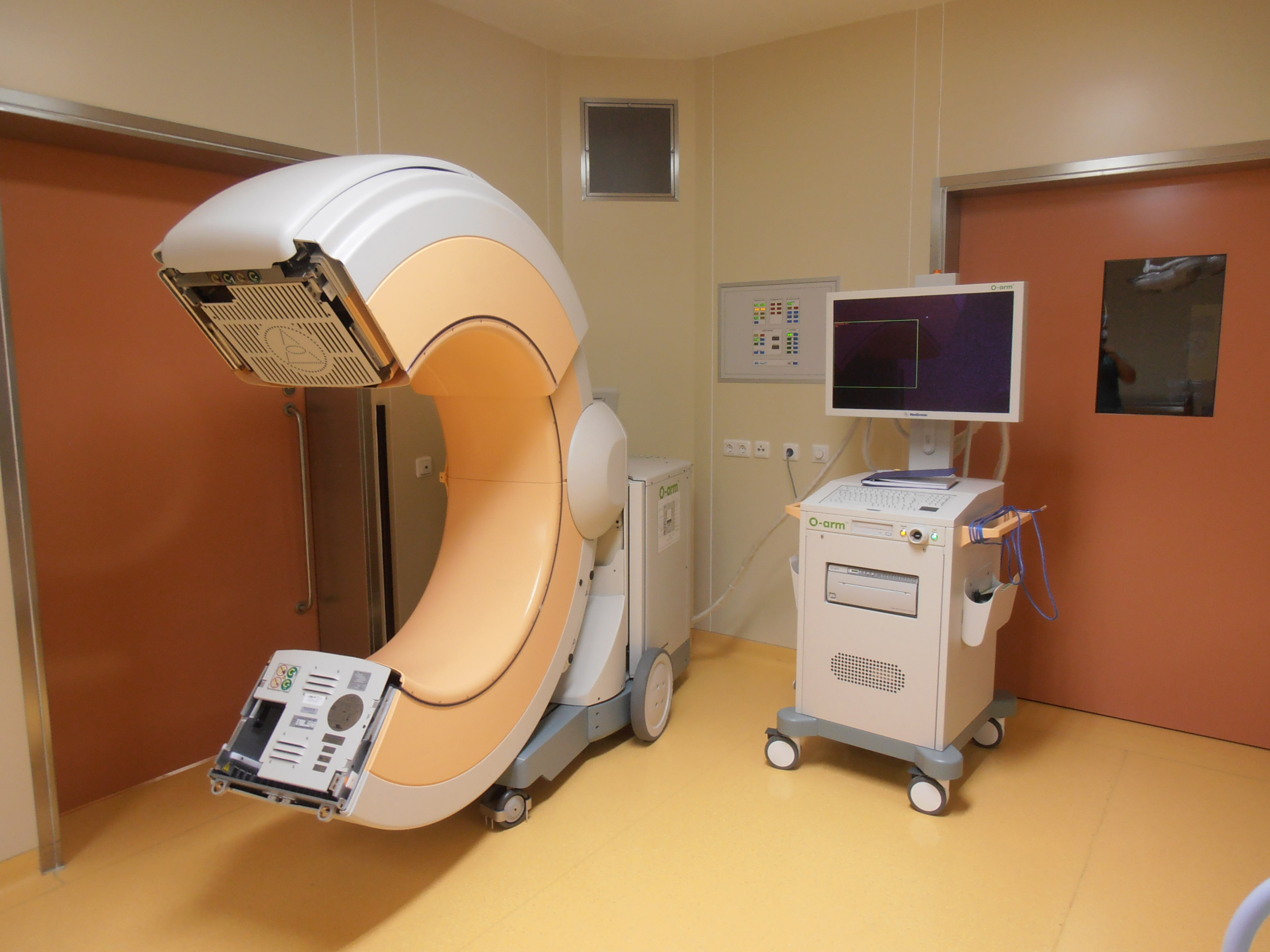
Tomographic microscope O-arm ® Surgical Imaging System

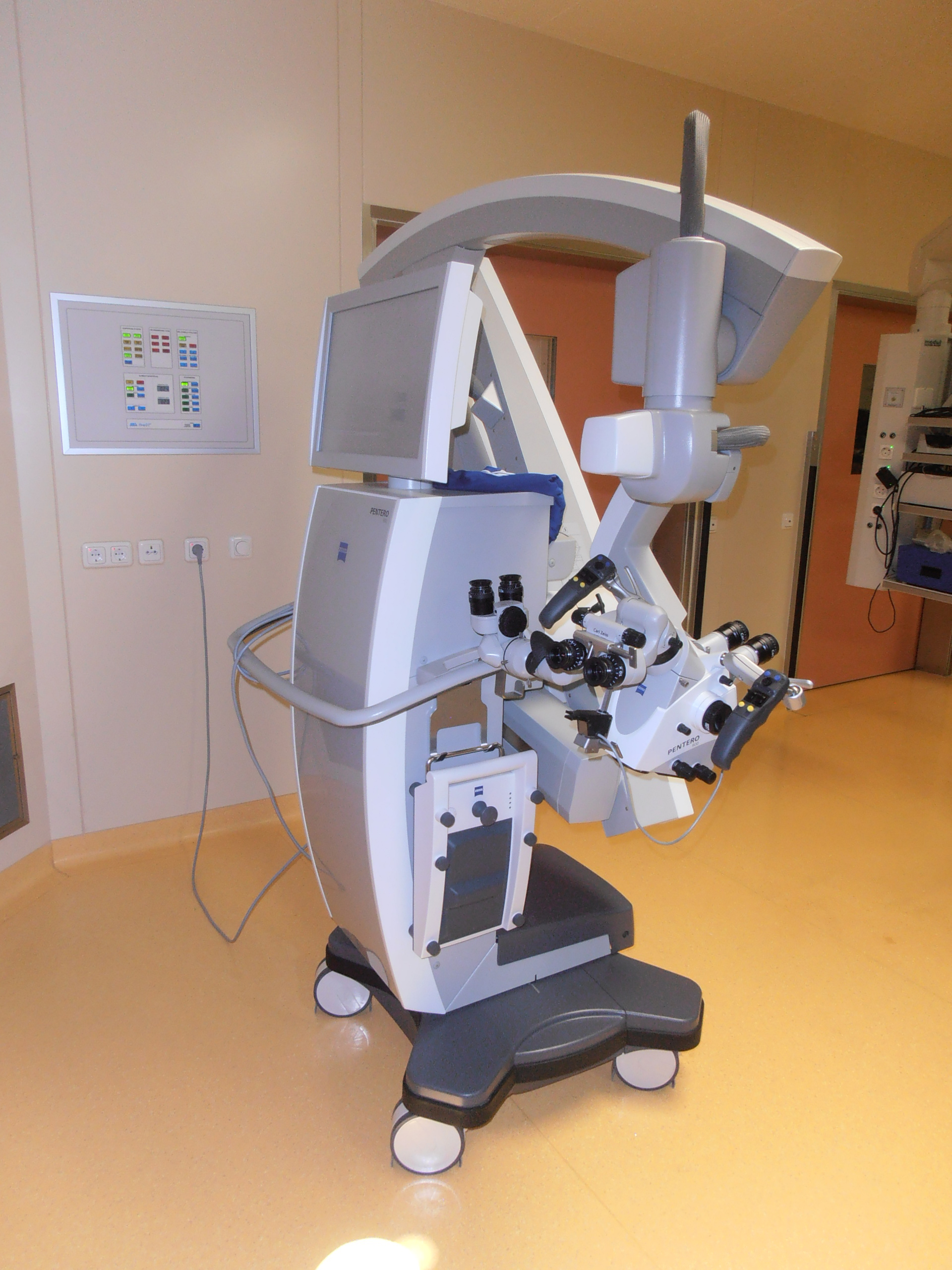
Surgical Stereo Microscope Carl Zeiss

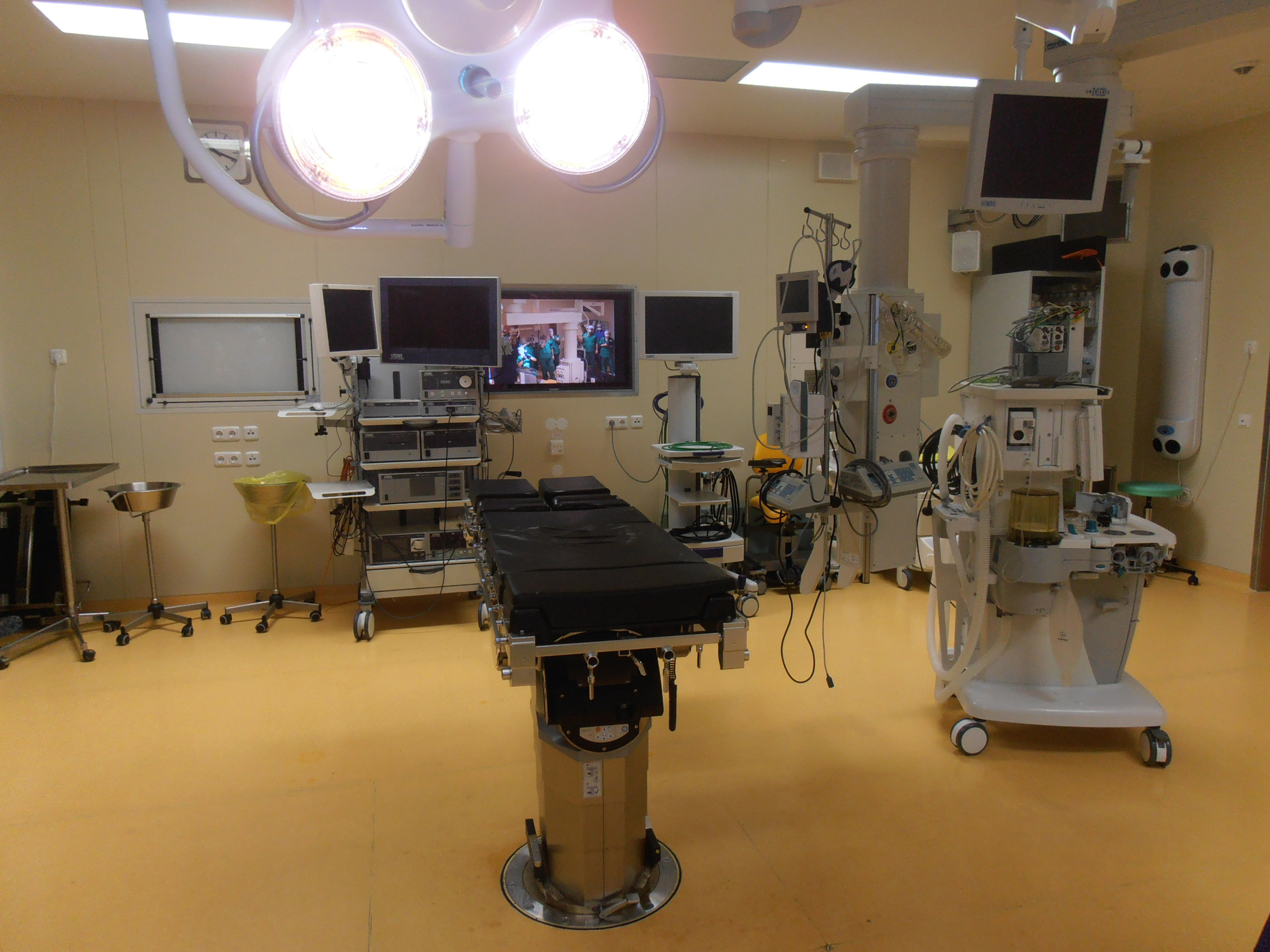
System of telemedicine
