= Steroid eluting sinus stent =

Steroid-eluting sinus stents may be used in addition to endoscopic sinus surgery. They are, however, of unclear benefit as of 2015.

One version releases mometasone furoate. It is a bioabsorbable steroid-eluting stent. It delivers steroids over a 30-day period prior to dissolving.

== Society and culture ==
A number of brands exist including Relieva Stratus Spacer and Propel sinus implant.

=== Approval ===
One brand received pre-market approval from the FDA in 2011.

== See also ==
- Drug-eluting stent
- Steroid
