= Bispectral index =

Technology for monitoring anesthesia

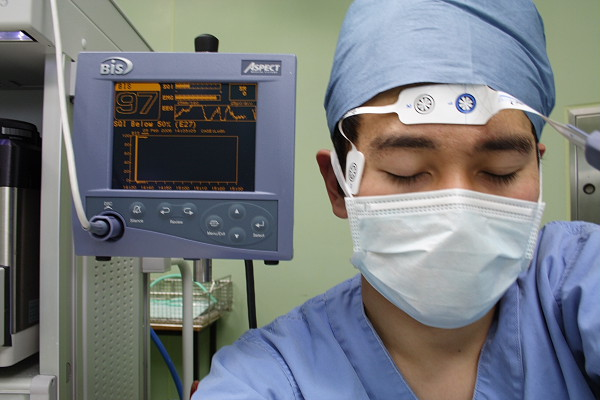
BIS monitor

Bispectral index (BIS) is one of several technologies used to monitor depth of anesthesia. BIS monitors are used to supplement Guedel's classification system for determining depth of anesthesia. Titrating anesthetic agents to a specific bispectral index during general anesthesia in adults (and children over 1 year old) allows the anesthetist to adjust the amount of anesthetic agent to the needs of the patient, possibly resulting in a more rapid emergence from anesthesia. Use of the BIS monitor could reduce the incidence of intraoperative awareness during anaesthesia. The exact details of the algorithm used to create the BIS index have not been disclosed by the company that developed it.

BIS cannot be used as the sole monitor of anesthesia, as it is affected by several other factors, including the anesthetic drugs used (BIS is relatively insensitive to agents such as ketamine and nitrous oxide), and muscle movement or artifact from surgical equipment. BIS is used as an adjunct to monitoring under anesthesia. Its use has been shown to reduce the overall dose of anesthetic agents used and therefore may improve recovery time from anesthesia.

== History ==
The BIS brain monitoring system was introduced by Aspect Medical Systems, Inc. in 1994 as a novel measure of the level of consciousness by algorithmic analysis of a patient's electroencephalogram during general anesthesia. This is used in conjunction with other physiologic monitoring such as electromyography to estimate the depth of anesthesia in order to minimize the possibility of intraoperative awareness. The US Food and Drug Administration (FDA) cleared BIS monitoring in 1996 for assessing the hypnotic effects of general anesthetics and sedatives. The FDA further stated in 2003 that "...A reduction in awareness provides a public health benefit, in that BIS technology can now provide anesthestists with a way to reduce this often debilitating, yet preventable medical error". Aspect Medical was acquired by Covidien in 2009.

== Calculation ==
Bispectral index monitor indicating a nearly isoelectric pattern of electroencephalographic activity.

The bispectral index is a statistically based, empirically derived complex parameter. It is a weighted sum of several electroencephalographic subparameters, including a time domain, frequency domain, and high order spectral subparameters. The BIS monitor provides a single dimensionless number, which ranges from 0 (equivalent to EEG silence) to 100. A BIS value between 40 and 60 indicates an appropriate level for general anesthesia, as recommended by the manufacturer. The BIS monitor thus gives the anesthetist an indication of how "deep" under anesthesia the patient is. Additionally, BIS values less than 40 for greater than 5 minutes have been associated with increased risk of stroke (hazard ratio of 3.23), MI (1.94) and death (1.41).

The essence of BIS is to take a complex signal (the EEG), analyse it, and process the result into a single number. Several other systems claim to be able to perform the same thing. The recent availability of cheap, fast computer processors has enabled great advances in this field. When a subject is awake, the cerebral cortex is very active, and the EEG reflects vigorous activity. When asleep or under general anesthesia, the pattern of activity changes. Overall, there is a change from higher-frequency signals to lower-frequency signals (which can be shown by Fourier analysis), and there is a tendency for signal correlation from different parts of the cortex to become more random.

As with other types of EEG analysis, the calculation algorithm that the BIS monitor uses is proprietary, although it has been successfully reverse engineered.

== Limitations ==
Some of the limitations of this form of processed EEG monitoring are:

- Unreliability with certain drugs, such as ketamine, nitrous oxide and ephedrine. Ketamine may produce a paradoxical transient increase in BIS values as this increase is associated with deepening of the hypnotic state.
- Difficulty titrating anesthetics in patients 6 months or younger.
- Interference by other medical devices such as electrosurgical cautery or forced air warming devices.
- Unreliable in cases of hypothermia or neurological impairment.
- Events unrelated to titration of anesthetic drugs can produce rapid changes in BIS values, such as cerebral hypoperfusion, gas embolism, and hemorrhage.
- The BIS value may lag behind the observed clinical state by 5 to 15 seconds related to EEG processing.

== Benefits ==
BIS monitoring is widely used in operating rooms and ICUs, as well as in emergency departments. Some of the benefits that have been attributed to it include:

- Reduced time to extubation and discharge from the operating room and PACU
- Reduced risk of postoperative nausea and vomiting
- Reduced use of propofol
- Reduced risk of awareness, although this claim is questioned by some studies.

== Relevance ==
The BIS is an electroencephalogram-derived multivariant scale that, when a drug such as propofol is used, correlates with the metabolic rate of glucose. Both loss of consciousness and awakening from anesthesia are correlated with this scale. The efficacy of BIS index monitoring is not without controversy.

Some controlled studies have found that using the BIS reduced the incidence of memory but this was not confirmed in several very large multicenter studies on awareness. A Cochrane review in 2014 found that "Four studies (7761 patients) that used clinical signs as a guide to anaesthetic administration in standard practice, as the control group, demonstrated a significant reduction in the risk of awareness with BIS monitoring. Four studies (26,530 patients) compared BIS monitoring with end tidal anaesthetic gas (ETAG) monitoring as a guide to management of anaesthesia and they did not demonstrate any difference in terms of intraoperative awareness". The Sociedad de Anestesiología Reanimación y Terapéutica del Dolor de Madrid recommends monitoring of anesthetic depth in accordance with literature-based evidence. BIS, however, is not explicitly endorsed. In fact, they cite an American Society of Anesthesiologists (ASA) statement saying that the decision for cerebral function monitoring should be made on an individual basis.

The bispectral index has not been proven to measure the level of consciousness, independently of the cause of reduced consciousness (whether this be drugs, metabolic disease, hypothermia, head trauma, hypovolemia, natural sleep and so on). Not all unconscious patients will have a low BIS value, although the general clinical state may be very different from one to the other, and the prognosis may also differ. Furthermore, not all conscious patients will have a high BIS value.

The bispectral index is prone to artifacts. Some conscious patients who are administered neuromuscular blocking agents such as succinylcholine may have low bispectral index scores; thus, the BIS may fail to detect consciousness in such patients. Its numbers cannot be relied upon in all situations, including brain death, circulatory arrest or hypothermia. A monitor of the Autonomic Nervous System (the first commercial monitor was the ANEMON-I monitor developed by former Swiss company Medical System SA based on the patent WO1997037586) may be more appropriate for purposely assessing the reaction to noxious stimuli during surgery. However, a monitor of the central nervous system may be more appropriate for monitoring consciousness. After the publication of the B-Aware Trial ensuring that the BIS index was below 60 was suggested to reduce the risk of anesthesia awareness during surgery for a 'high risk' group, when using a conventional anaesthetic technique. However, this result was not reproduced by a recently published randomized control trial, the "B-Unaware Trial". In it, the use of BIS monitoring was not associated with a lower incidence of anesthesia awareness. In some cases, the BIS may underestimate the depth of anesthesia, leading the anesthetist to administer a higher than necessary dose of anesthetic agent(s). In such cases, the patient may be anesthetized to a lower BIS level than is necessary for the surgery or procedure—this is called "treating the BIS", and may result in a deeper level of anesthesia than required).

The monitoring of EEG in ICU patients has been employed in one form or other for more than two decades. BIS monitoring is also being used during transport of critically ill patients in ambulances, helicopters and other vehicles.

Some studies show a greater incidence of intra-operative awareness in children, when compared to adults. The correlation between bispectral index in children over one year and state of consciousness has already been proven, although in younger patients the monitor is unreliable because of the differences between immature infant EEG patterns and the adult EEG patterns that the BIS algorithm utilises.

Specifically for intraoperative awareness, according to a 2013 article in The Atlantic, "Today, the BIS monitor has become the most controversial medical device in anesthesiology, if not all of surgery."

== See also ==
- Anaesthetic machine
- Entropy monitoring
- Evoked potentials
- Respiratory monitoring
- Spectral edge frequency
