= Cardiac reserve =

Cardiac reserve refers to the difference between the rates at which the heart pumps blood - at any given time versus its maximum capacity. A measurement of the cardiac reserve may be a health indicator for some medical conditions. Cardiac reserve may be 4-5 times greater than a resting value for a healthy person.

== Measurements ==
Cardiac reserve has been measured in different ways over the history of the test.

It is possible to make a non-invasive measurement of cardiac reserve.

== Significance ==
A measure of cardiac reserve can help predict the likelihood of heart failure when indicated.
