= Outcomes Research Consortium =

International clinical research group

Outcomes Research
- Type: Non-profit organization
- Genre: Clinical Research
- Founder: Dr. Daniel I. Sessler
- Headquarters: Cleveland, United States
- Number of locations: Dublin, Tel Aviv, Vienna, Melbourne, Kyoto, Beijing, Shanghai, and Dallas
- Key people: Daniel I. Sessler MD, M. Alparslan Turan MD and Andrea Kurz MD
- Website: http://or.org

The Outcomes Research Consortium (stylized as OUTCOMES RESEARCH) is an international clinical research group that focuses on the perioperative period (during and after surgery), along with critical care and pain management. The Consortium's aim is to improve the quality of care for surgical, critical care, and chronic pain patients and to "Provide the evidence for evidence-based practice." Members of the Consortium are especially interested in testing simple, low-risk, and inexpensive treatments that have the potential to markedly improve patients' surgical experiences.

The 25-year anniversary of the Consortium and its accomplishments were celebrated in an editorial in Anesthesiology. The editorial starts:

Imagine a research group made up of more than 100 members working both independently and collaboratively across many countries having no legal standing, no bank account, and loosely organized, but devoted to the goal of improving health care through the understanding of the results of health care practices. Furthermore, imagine that members of this organization have published more than 900 full journal articles since its inception and publish a new full paper every 5 days. It may be hard to believe that such a unique organization exists, but it does. It is known as the Outcomes Research Consortium.

— Rosenberg, Henry (December 2015). "Outcomes Research Consortium's 25th Anniversary". Anesthesiology.

== History ==
The Outcomes Research Group was formed in 1990 at the University of California San Francisco, and thus celebrated its 25th anniversary in 2015. The Consortium now includes about 130 university-based investigators at more than 20 hospitals in 10 countries. The primary requirement for membership is ongoing active collaboration with Consortium members. It is by far the world's largest and most productive clinical anesthesia research group. The Consortium's administrative center is the Department of Outcomes Research in the Anesthesiology Institute at the Cleveland Clinic in Cleveland, Ohio, United States. The director is Daniel I. Sessler, MD and the associate director is Andrea Kurz, MD.

The Consortium differs from many organizations in not being a society, association, or foundation. Nor it is a company. In fact, the Consortium does not legally exist. A consequence is that grant funding always flows directly to members' institutions, an intentionally unusual structure designed to prevent members from having perceived conflicts of commitment between the Consortium and their academic institutions.

== Research highlights ==
The or.org website showcases journal covers with affiliated research on this page: "Journal Covers".

The Consortium coordinates more than 100 clinical studies, including large multi-center outcome studies. Among the Consortium's more than 900 full papers, about 200 papers were in Anesthesiology and a comparable number were in Anesthesia & Analgesia; well over a dozen were published in The New England Journal of Medicine or The Lancet. The Consortium's papers have been cited about 30,000 times. Since 2008, nineteen of the Consortium's articles have been features on the covers of Anesthesiology or Anesthesia & Analgesia.

Consortium members were among the first anesthesia investigators to conduct large-scale outcome trials. That is, randomized trials with meaningful "hard" primary outcomes. Large outcome trials remain a focus for the group. They were also among the first anesthesia investigators to conduct large-scale registry research.

Taking advantage of dense interconnected registries at the Cleveland Clinic, along with half-a-dozen national databases, the group has conducted hundreds of cohort, case-control, and health policy analyses. For example, they have developed several accurate risk-stratification models which permit accurate comparisons across divergent patient groups (i.e., risk-adjusted comparisons amongst hospitals).

== Temperature regulation during surgery ==
Body temperature is normally tightly regulated to about 37 °C (98.6 °F), with women being slightly warmer than men. The Consortium is perhaps best known for perioperative thermoregulation, with members having published far more on the subject than all other investigators combined.

In a series of several hundred studies, for example, Consortium members identified dose-dependent effects of every major anesthetic and sedative on thermoregulatory control, and consequent alterations in heat balance. Impaired temperature control, combined with a cold operating room environment, makes most unwarmed surgical patients hypothermic by 1-3 °C. In contrast, patients warmed with forced-air are usually normothermic by the end of surgery.

Randomized trials by the Consortium have shown that just a 1-2 °C reduction in body temperature markedly increases the risk of wound infection, prolongs recovery and hospitalization, increases blood loss and transfusion requirement, and slows drug metabolism.

Because hypothermia causes so many serious complications, The Surgical Care Improvement Project (SCIP) and Physicians Quality Forum have each made perioperative normothermia an outcome measure for hospital quality. Consortium thermoregulatory research has been covered by the Cleveland Plain Dealer, the Philadelphia Inquirer, Reuters Health, and United Press International.

== Red hair and anesthesia ==
Findings on the relationship between red hair and anesthesia were covered by National Geographic

150 years after their discovery, how anesthetic gases work remains unknown. They work well in all mammals, rodents, insects, worms, fish, bacteria, and even plants. The dose required in various species doesn't differ much from the dose in humans. In non-human species, there are distinct genetic characteristics that clearly influence anesthetic sensitivity. But until recently, no genetic factors were known to influence anesthetic requirement in humans. In a series of studies, Consortium members have shown that the effective dose of anesthetic gases is about 20% greater in natural redheads than in people with other hair colors.

Red hair results from a mutation of the melanocortin-1 receptor. The Consortium's results thus indicate that something about this receptor influences anesthetic action. Red hair was the first phenotype (physically apparent characteristics linked to a genetic mutation) linked to anesthetic requirement in humans, and remains the only one. Consortium research on red hair and anesthetic requirement has been covered by the San Francisco Examiner, The Globe and Mail, Reader's Digest, and National Geographic.

In further research, members of the Consortium found that redheads are resistant to local anesthetics. Consequently, they are more likely to suffer pain during dental procedures — and are therefore reluctant to receive needed dental care. Consortium research on red hair and dental avoidance has been covered by Macleans, the Boston Herald, and The New York Times.

== Postoperative Myocardial Injury after Noncardiac Surgery (MINS) ==
The Consortium routinely collaborates with the two other large anesthesia trial groups: 1) the Population Health Research Institute (PJ Devereaux); and 2) the Australian and New Zealand College of Anaesthetists Trials Network (Paul Myles and Kate Leslie). In a series of huge trials, the groups have shown that perioperative myocardial injury is common, clinically silent, deadly — and hard to prevent. The Population Health Research Institute and Consortium dubbed this phenomenon, first described in the landmark 2012 VISION Study, as Myocardial Injury after Noncardiac Surgery, or MINS.

All-cause one-month mortality after non-cardiac surgery is about 1%; amongst inpatients, it is about 2%. In fact, if the postoperative period were considered a distinct disease, it would be the third leading cause of death in the United States. The leading cause of unexpected death after otherwise routine surgery is myocardial infarction. Worldwide, 9% of surgical inpatients over the age of 45 years have a postoperative myocardial infarction — making infarctions by far the leading cause of unexpected death after otherwise routine surgery. Only 15% of postoperative infarctions present with chest pain, and 65% are entirely clinically silent which means that they will not be detected without routine blood testing for troponin (a sensitive biomarker for myocardial injury). Thirty-day mortality in patients with elevated postoperative troponin (with or without symptoms) is 10% which represents a factor-of-five increase.

The number-needed-to-test to detect postoperative infarctions that would otherwise be missed is roughly 1/(9%-2%) = 14 patients. This is a much smaller number than for many other tests we do routinely for conditions that are far less deadly. Consistent with this logic, the current Universal Definition of MI guidelines recommends: "Routine monitoring of cardiac biomarkers in high-risk patients after major surgery is therefore recommended." Although how perioperative myocardial infarctions should be treated remains under active investigation, it is nonetheless well worth monitoring troponin to screen for infarctions because the prognosis is poor, and infarctions represent opportunities to make sure blood pressure, heart rate, and lipids are controlled. They are also an opportunity for life-style guidance, including recommendations related to smoking cessation, exercise, and diet.

How to prevent postoperative myocardial injury remains unknown. Beta blockers prevent myocardial infarctions, but at the cost of devastating strokes. Avoiding nitrous oxide does not prevent infarctions, but also does no harm. Aspirin also does not prevent infarctions, while promoting serious surgical bleeding.: Clonidine does not prevent infarctions, while promoting serious hypotension. And neither prevents acute kidney injury. How to prevent perioperative myocardial injury remains under active investigation, but preventing hypotension may help. The Consortium's work in this area was summarized in the New England Journal of Medicine.

== Acute and persistent surgical pain ==
About a hundred Consortium studies evaluate aspects of acute pain including peripheral nerve blocks and multimodal analgesia; the group is now especially interested in persistent incisional pain. Persistent pain after surgery is surprisingly common, with 10-20% of patients reporting pain 6 or 12 months after surgery. After high risk operations such as hernia repair, mastectomy, and thoracotomy, the reported risk is up to 50%. Pain that persists at 12 months is often permanent, and many patients with pain report that it significantly interferes with their lives. Persistent incisional pain is notoriously difficult to treat.

What causes acute surgical pain to become persistent remains unclear. However, it seems likely to result from some combination of local tissue injury, inflammation, and abnormal activation of excitatory pain pathways. How to prevent, much less treat persistent pain remains unknown. About a dozen current Consortium studies address this major public health issue.

== Other research areas ==
Major ongoing initiatives for the consortium include acute and chronic pain management, automative or continuous vital sign monitoring, fluid management, control of the surgical stress response. A recent study shows that inadequate oxygenation after surgery is surprisingly common, severe, and long-lasting.

A particular interest of the group is long-term outcomes of anesthetic management. While the effects of anesthesia have traditionally been considered to dissipate within hours of surgery, there is increasing evidence that anesthetic management may alter patient outcomes weeks, months, or even years after surgery. For example, unlikely as it might seem, there is strong basic science and animal evidence suggesting the regional analgesia (such as spinal and epidural blocks, or paravertebral nerve blocks) might reduce the risk of recurrence after potentially curative cancer surgery. The Consortium is currently conducting several large randomized trials of regional analgesia and cancer recurrence.

Outcomes Research statisticians routinely publish methodology articles, and their analyses set standards for statistical approaches throughout the specialty. Furthermore, the group has also developed entirely new research methods including alternating intervention studies and automated trials coordinated by background decision support systems with completely electronic data acquisition — both being novel approaches to large-scale research. Consortium members also write about conduct of clinical research, and research directions.

== Consortium sites ==
Site directors administer the most active Consortium affiliates at universities in Dublin, Tel Aviv, Vienna, Melbourne, Kyoto, Beijing, Shanghai, Hamburg, Hamilton, and Dallas.

== See also ==
- Clinical Research
- Anesthesia
- Cleveland Clinic
- Perioperative Medicine
- Pain Medicine
