= Sean Mackey (physician) =

Sean C. Mackey
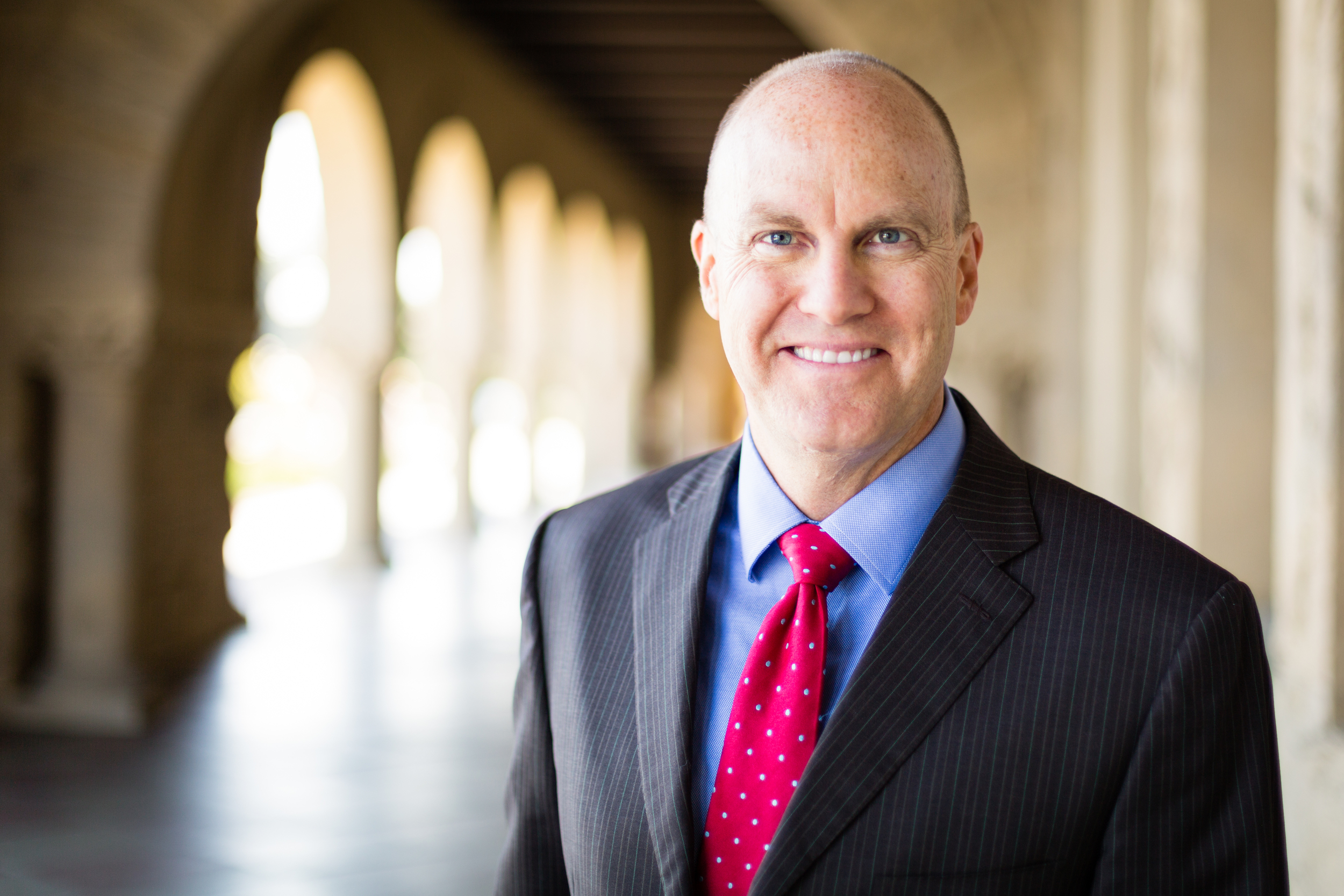
- Born: March 29, 1963
- Citizenship: United States of America
- Education: University of Pennsylvania; University of Arizona
- Awards: NIH Director's Award
- Scientific career
- Fields: Anesthesiology; Pain Medicine; Neurology
- Workplaces: Stanford University
- Thesis: A dynamic model of radio frequency catheter ablation for the treatment of cardiac arrhythmias. (1994)
- Website: https://drseanmackey.com

Sean C. Mackey is an American scientist, anesthesiologist and pain medicine specialist. Since 2012, he has served as the Redlich Professor of Anesthesiology, Perioperative and Pain Medicine, Neurosciences and Neurology (by courtesy) at Stanford University. He has been the Chief of the Division of Pain Medicine since 2007 and the Director and Founder of the Systems Neuroscience and Pain Laboratory (SNAPL) since 2002. Previously, he practiced anesthesiology and co-founded Stanford's regional anesthesia program in 2000.

Mackey served as President of the American Academy of Pain Medicine from 2014 to 2015 and currently serves as the Co-Chair of the Oversight Committee for the National Institutes of Health Health and Human Services National Pain Strategy. In 2015, Mackey was awarded the NIH Director's Award for his efforts on the National Pain Strategy.

He is a reviewer for the journals Anesthesia & Analgesia, Anesthesiology, Pain, Regional Anesthesia and Pain Medicine, Behavioral Neuroscience, European Journal of Pain, Journal of Neuroscience, PLOS Biology, Science Translational Medicine, Brain Research, Pain Medicine, Gastroenterology and Cerebral Cortex.

== Education and training ==
Mackey graduated from the University of Pennsylvania with a B.S.E and M.S.E. in 1986. He received his M.D. and Ph.D. from the University of Arizona in 1994. He completed his residency training in anesthesiology at Stanford University Medical Center in 1998 and his clinical fellowship training in pain medicine in 1999. He is board certified in anesthesia and pain management from the American Board of Anesthesiology.

== Career and research ==
Mackey is the author of over 200 journal articles, book chapters, abstracts, and popular press pieces.

In 2002, Mackey founded the Systems Neuroscience and Pain Laboratory (SNAPL) and has served as the director since. His lab uses state-of the art neuroimaging tools. They investigate emotional and cognitive factors that influence pain, as well neural plastic changes that occur in chronic pain patients using a variety of research methods such as pharmacology, clinical trials, and neuropsychology.

His research has received numerous mentions from prominent publications including AP News, Forbes, Bloomberg, Nature, NBC Nightly News, NPR, Scientific American, The Atlantic, The New York Times, TIME Magazine, The Wall Street Journal and more.

== Publications ==
=== Patents ===
- 1999 US5931835 "Radio frequency energy delivery system for multipolar electrode catheters"
- 2005 WO2005072433 "TOXIN INDUCED SYMPATHECTOMY"
