= Geoffrey Kaye =

Geoffrey Kaye (1903–1986) was an Australian anaesthetist.

== Early life and education ==
Geoffrey Kaye was born Geoffrey Alfred Kornblum in St Kilda, Melbourne, Australia in 1903, the son of Rosetta Levison and Alfred Kornblum. He was educated in England, and studied medicine at the University of Melbourne, graduating MBBS in 1926. As Resident Medical Officer at Melbourne's Alfred Hospital in 1927, he was assigned to anaesthetics and quickly developed an affinity for the practice. He was appointed Honorary Anaesthetist to the Alfred Hospital in 1930. At this time, he was one of a small number of full-time anaesthetists in Australia.

== Anaesthesia ==
After graduation, Kaye was in the fortunate position of being able to travel widely at a time when few could. During his travels he took the opportunity to meet with, and learn from, anaesthetists in the UK, US, Germany and Scandinavia. On return to Australia, he began experimenting with anaesthetic equipment, engineering equipment for personal use and, later, for the Australian Army. Additionally, Kaye worked with other anaesthesia staff from the Alfred Hospital to produce Australia's first textbook on anaesthesia. Practical Anaesthesia was published in 1932, and included a foreword by Francis McMechan, Secretary General, International Anesthesia Research Society. During his travels he had become aware of the collegiate nature of the American Society of Anesthesiologists, and was determined to create something similar in Australia. In 1934 he successfully established the Australian Society of Anaesthetists, which launched at an anaesthetic congress in Hobart, Tasmania. At that time, its headquarters was at 49 Mathoura Road, Toorak. Before World War II he served as its first secretary. He was a major figure in the attempt to convert anaesthesia in Australia from a trade to an academic discipline.

== Wartime ==
Dr Kaye served in the Middle East during World War II, providing anaesthetic advice to the Infantry Corps.

Kaye was also a contributor and editor to a second Australian publication on anaesthesia, Anaesthetic Methods in 1946, along with Robert Orton and Douglas Renton.

== Legacy ==
Dr Kaye died in Melbourne in 1986. He is memorialised by the Geoffrey Kaye Oration at the Australian Society of Anaesthetists annual meeting and by the Geoffrey Kaye Museum at the headquarters of the Australian and New Zealand College of Anaesthetists. Many of his non-medical collectables such as porcelain items are held at the Ian Potter Museum at the University of Melbourne.
