= Steven P. Cohen =

American pain physician and anesthesiologist

- Occupation: Anesthesiologist

Academic background
- Education: Icahn School of Medicine at Mount Sinai

Academic work
- Institutions: Northwestern University Feinberg School of Medicine; Walter Reed National Military Medical Center; Uniformed Services University of the Health Sciences

Steven Paul Cohen is an American physician and anesthesiologist specializing in pain medicine. He holds a named chair as the inaugural Edmond I. Eger Professor of Anesthesiology and is vice chair of research and pain medicine at the Northwestern University Feinberg School of Medicine, and director of pain research at Walter Reed National Military Medical Center. He became president of the American Society of Regional Anesthesia and Pain Medicine (ASRA Pain Medicine) in 2025, and earlier served as chief of pain medicine at Johns Hopkins Hospital.

His research concerns sacroiliac joint pain, compounded topical pain creams, spinal pain, and pain management in military populations. He was first author of the 2021 Lancet review "Chronic pain: an update on burden, best practices, and new advances" and has chaired or co-chaired working groups developing consensus guidelines for interventional pain procedures.

Cohen is a retired colonel in the United States Army who deployed four times, including in support of operations in Iraq and Afghanistan. Much of his research has concerned pain in military personnel, including studies of medical evacuation and return to duty. Since 2025 he has been senior author of studies of post-amputation pain in Ukrainian war amputees, some of which were reported in national media.

== Education and career ==
Cohen received his M.D. from the Icahn School of Medicine at Mount Sinai in 1989. He completed an anesthesiology residency at NewYork-Presbyterian Hospital (Columbia campus) in 1993 and a pain medicine fellowship at Massachusetts General Hospital in 2000. He is board-certified by the American Board of Anesthesiology in anesthesiology and pain medicine. Cohen joined the Johns Hopkins School of Medicine faculty and became chief of pain medicine at Johns Hopkins Hospital in 2014. During his time at Johns Hopkins, he also served as director of pain research at Walter Reed and held a professorship at the Uniformed Services University of the Health Sciences. He has continued in both roles, with the professorship now an adjunct appointment.

He moved to Northwestern in summer 2024 as the inaugural Edmond I. Eger Professor of Anesthesiology and vice chair of research and pain medicine. He also holds faculty appointments in neurology, psychiatry and behavioral sciences, and neurological surgery. He practices at the Northwestern Medicine Anesthesiology/Pain Medicine Center in Chicago.

ASRA Pain Medicine lists him as president for 2025–2027, succeeding David Provenzano. He was on the pain-medicine editorial board of Mayo Clinic Proceedings by 2019.

== Research ==
=== Compounded topical creams ===
Cohen was senior author of a 2019 randomized trial in Annals of Internal Medicine involving 399 patients with localized neuropathic, nociceptive, or mixed pain. At one month, the tested compounded creams did not produce greater reductions in average pain scores than placebo. The authors concluded that their cost and lack of demonstrated benefit argued against routine use. Johns Hopkins Medicine described the study as federally funded and mandated by Congress. In a 2024 interview, Cohen linked the study to a mandate in the National Defense Authorization Act for Fiscal Year 2014.

JAMA summarized the trial under the heading "Compounded Pain Creams Offer No Benefit", and Medscape also reported its findings.

=== Sacroiliac joint and spinal pain ===
A small sham-controlled trial led by Cohen, published in Anesthesiology in 2008, found that radiofrequency denervation relieved injection-diagnosed sacroiliac joint pain more often than a sham procedure through six months, although few treated patients still met the pain-relief threshold at one year. A 2025 consensus guideline identified it as the first sham-controlled trial of radiofrequency denervation for sacroiliac joint complex pain.

A 2024 multicenter trial of 210 patients found that cooled radiofrequency ablation reduced pain more than standard medical management at three months; as a comparative effectiveness study, it had no sham control.

A randomized study led by Cohen, published online in 2011 in Archives of Internal Medicine (now JAMA Internal Medicine), found that obtaining magnetic resonance imaging (MRI) before an epidural steroid injection did not improve outcomes or meaningfully affect decision making in patients with lumbosacral radiculopathy. The authors noted that guidelines had recommended imaging before such injections. A 2007 joint guideline from the American College of Physicians and the American Pain Society, for example, recommended MRI or CT for patients with persistent low back pain and suspected radiculopathy only if they were candidates for surgery or epidural steroid injection. A 2015 multidisciplinary consensus on epidural steroid injection safety, convened with the Food and Drug Administration's Safe Use Initiative, recommended reviewing prior imaging before cervical interlaminar injections but made no such recommendation for lumbar injections; it cited the study in its discussion of imaging.

A subsequent systematic review and meta-analysis in Anesthesiology, with Cohen as senior author, examined the epidural injections without steroids used as controls in such trials; indirect comparisons suggested that these injections may themselves provide benefit compared with injections outside the epidural space, although few, low-quality studies compared them directly. The New York Times reported on the review, quoting Cohen as saying that most of the short-term benefit appeared to come not from the steroid but from the local anesthetic and saline. Johns Hopkins Medicine also publicized it in a press release. The review altered the interpretation of studies of epidural steroid injections and how clinical trials of them are designed. At the 2014 US Food and Drug Administration advisory committee meeting on the safety and effectiveness of epidural steroid injections, Cohen presented evidence on their effectiveness as the first of three invited speakers.

=== Reviews and consensus guidelines ===
Cohen coordinated pain series for BMJ, Mayo Clinic Proceedings, and The Lancet. He co-authored a 2014 BMJ review of neuropathic pain with Jianren Mao and wrote a 2015 Mayo Clinic Proceedings review of the epidemiology, diagnosis, and treatment of neck pain.

He was first author, with Lene Vase and W. Michael Hooten, of the 2021 Lancet review "Chronic pain: an update on burden, best practices, and new advances". He also co-authored the journal's 2018 series paper on prevention and treatment of low back pain and its 2021 seminar "Low back pain".

Cohen chaired the committee that developed the 2018 consensus guidelines from ASRA Pain Medicine, the American Academy of Pain Medicine, and the American Society of Anesthesiologists on intravenous ketamine infusions for acute and chronic pain. He was first author of the chronic pain guidelines and senior and corresponding author of the acute pain guidelines. The chronic pain guidelines reviewed indications including complex regional pain syndrome and spinal cord injury pain, noting that much of the evidence came from small or poorly blinded studies.

He chaired the working group for the 2020 lumbar facet joint guidelines and co-chaired the groups for the cervical facet joint guidelines published online in 2021 and the 2025 sacroiliac joint guidelines. He was senior and corresponding author on the 2026 US Department of Defense consensus guidelines on neuromodulation for pain management in an active-duty military population.

=== Military pain research ===
In 2007, Ron L. White and Cohen reported on a facility they described as the first forward-deployed pain treatment center. Over six months, it treated 132 patients, including 113 members of coalition forces. Lumbar radiculopathy was the most common diagnosis, and the return-to-duty rate among coalition patients was 94.7%.

A 2010 Lancet cohort study co-authored by Cohen examined medical evacuations from Iraq and Afghanistan. Musculoskeletal disorders, combat injuries, neurological and psychiatric diagnoses, and spinal pain were among the leading reasons for evacuation; spinal pain was associated with a lower likelihood of returning to duty. In a 2009 study of 1,410 service members evacuated for back pain between 2004 and 2007, the return-to-unit rate was 13%.

Cohen has collaborated with Ukrainian physicians, including Roman Smolynets of the First Lviv Medical Union, on studies of war-related post-amputation pain, partly funded by the US Department of Defense. An observational study of 74 amputees, first published online in 2025, found that adding ultrasound-guided hydrodissection of painful neuromas to opioid therapy was associated with greater reductions in residual limb pain through 12 weeks, and in phantom limb pain through four weeks, than opioids alone, and with reduced opioid use; Northwestern described the study as exploratory rather than controlled. In a comparison of 166 amputees at two Ukrainian hospitals, patients who received botulinum toxin injections, given around residual-limb neuromas, under sensitized skin or into trigger points, had greater phantom limb pain relief at one month than those who received comprehensive medical and surgical care, but by three months phantom limb pain had fallen more in the comprehensive-care group. A year-long observational study of 156 amputees, published in EClinicalMedicine in 2026, found that phantom and residual limb pain declined substantially alongside anxiety and depression, and that depression and poorer quality of life were associated with later phantom limb pain.

Crain's Chicago Business and Chicago television reporter Dina Bair covered the hydrodissection work. The botulinum toxin findings were reported by the New York Post, The Independent, NBC News and Fox 32 Chicago; the Independent and Fox 32 identified Cohen as senior author, and the Post quoted him. He discussed the botulinum toxin study on the BBC World Service programme Health Check in November 2025.

== Military service ==
Cohen has written that he entered active Army duty in 1993. He retired as a colonel and deployed four times in support of operations in Bosnia, Iraq, and Afghanistan. In 2024, he organized and chaired a pain conference in Ukraine.

== Selected publications ==
- Cohen, Steven P.; Hurley, Robert W.; Buckenmaier, Chester C.; et al. (August 2008). "Randomized placebo-controlled study evaluating lateral branch radiofrequency denervation for sacroiliac joint pain". Anesthesiology. 109 (2): 279–288. doi:10.1097/ALN.0b013e31817f4c7c. PMC 2666931. PMID 18648237.
- Cohen, Steven P.; Brown, Charlie; Kurihara, Connie; et al. (2010). "Diagnoses and factors associated with medical evacuation and return to duty for service members participating in Operation Iraqi Freedom or Operation Enduring Freedom: a prospective cohort study". The Lancet. 375 (9711): 301–309. doi:10.1016/S0140-6736(09)61797-9. PMID 20109957.
- Cohen, Steven P.; Bhatia, Anuj; Buvanendran, Asokumar; et al. (2018). "Consensus Guidelines on the Use of Intravenous Ketamine Infusions for Chronic Pain From the American Society of Regional Anesthesia and Pain Medicine, the American Academy of Pain Medicine, and the American Society of Anesthesiologists". Regional Anesthesia & Pain Medicine. 43 (5): 521–546. doi:10.1097/AAP.0000000000000808. PMC 6023575. PMID 29870458.
- Brutcher, Robert E.; Kurihara, Connie; Bicket, Mark C.; et al. (2019). "Compounded Topical Pain Creams to Treat Localized Chronic Pain: A Randomized Controlled Trial". Annals of Internal Medicine. 170 (5): 309–318. doi:10.7326/M18-2736. PMID 30716769.
- Cohen, Steven P.; Vase, Lene; Hooten, W. Michael (2021). "Chronic pain: an update on burden, best practices, and new advances". The Lancet. 397 (10289): 2082–2097. doi:10.1016/S0140-6736(21)00393-7. PMID 34062143.
