= Intensivist =

Physician who treats critically ill patients in the ICU

Occupation
- Synonyms: Critical care doctor
- Occupation type: Specialty
- Activity sectors: Medicine

Description
- Education required: Doctor of Medicine or equivalent.
- Fields of employment: Hospitals, Intensive care unit, CVICU, Surgical ICU

An intensivist, also known as a critical care doctor, is a medical practitioner who specializes in the care of critically ill patients, most often in the intensive care unit (ICU). Intensivists can be internists, pulmonologists, anaesthesiologists, emergency medicine physicians, paediatricians, neonatologists, or surgeons who have completed a fellowship in critical care medicine. The intensivist must be competent in the diagnosis and management of a broad spectrum of medical and surgical conditions among critically ill patients and also with the technical procedures and equipment used in the intensive care setting such as airway management, rapid sequence induction of anaesthesia, maintenance and weaning of sedation, central venous and arterial catheterisation, point of care ultrasound, renal replacement therapy and management of mechanical ventilators.

== Training in different countries ==
=== Australia and New Zealand ===
Training in the medical speciality of intensive care medicine is facilitated and managed by the College of Intensive Care Medicine of Australia and New Zealand. Training takes a minimum of six years to complete after internship and involves a dedicated 12 months of clinical medicine training and 12 months of anaesthesia training in addition to training in the intensive care unit. Trainees also complete a first part exam in the relevant basic sciences and a second part 'Fellowship' exam towards the end of training. Doctors who complete training are awarded Fellowship of the College of Intensive Care Medicine of Australia and New Zealand (FCICM) and are eligible to practice as a consultant Intensivist.

=== Sweden ===
In Sweden, one speciality entails both anaesthesiology and intensive care, i.e., one cannot become an anaesthetist without also becoming an intensivist and vice versa. The Swedish Board of Health and Welfare regulates specialization for medical doctors in the country and defines the speciality of anaesthesiology and intensive care as being:

“[…] characterized by a cross-professional approach and entailing

- perioperative medicine,
- anaesthesia and pain relief during diagnostic and therapeutic procedures,
- intensive care,
- urgent care of patients with serious diseases and injuries,
- prehospital care including transport and disaster medicine, and
- pain management.”

A medical doctor can enter training as a resident in anaesthesiology and intensive care after obtaining a license to practice medicine, following an 18-24 month internship. The residency program then lasts at least five years, not including the internship. See also Residency (medicine), Sweden.

=== United States ===
After medical school there are several different routes to becoming an intensivist. One can do a three-year internal medicine residency, and then a three-year pulmonology/critical care fellowship, or a two-year critical care fellowship. Also, if starting with internal medicine, it is possible to do a different specialty fellowship entirely, such as three years for cardiovascular disease or gastrointestinal disease) plus one year of accredited clinical fellowship training in critical care medicine. It is also possible to complete a residency first in general surgery, anaesthesiology, and emergency medicine before applying for a one year fellowship in surgical critical care.

== Role in healthcare ==
Intensivists most often work in the intensive care unit. These physicians oversee the majority of care of these patients and make decisions about treatment, testing, procedures, consultations, etc. Majority of the patients that are admitted to the ICU are severely ill, and these physicians are experts at managing their complex challenges including multiple organ failure, life-threatening infections, trauma victims, and more. They must work with a large number of other professionals including physician assistants/nurse practitioner, registered nurses, pharmacists, respiratory therapists, and more.

Intensivists often man interhospital transfers of critically ill patients, both on short range helicopter or ground based missions, as well as longer range national transports to specialized centra or international missions to retrieve citizens injured abroad. Ambulance services employ units staffed by intensivists that can be called out to provide advanced airway management, blood transfusion, thoracotomy, ECMO, and ultrasound capabilities outside the hospital. Intensivists often (along with general surgeons and orthopaedic surgeons) make up part of military medical teams to provide anaesthesia and intensive care to trauma victims during armed conflicts.
