= Neurosurgical anesthesiology =

Subspecialty of anesthesiology

Occupation
- Occupation type: Specialty
- Activity sectors: Medicine

Description
- Education required: Doctor of Medicine (MD); Doctor of Osteopathic Medicine (DO); Bachelor of Medicine, Bachelor of Surgery (MBBS, MBCHB, et al.)
- Fields of employment: Hospitals, Clinics

Neurosurgical anesthesiology, neuroanesthesiology, or neurological anesthesiology is a subspecialty of anesthesiology devoted to the total perioperative care of patients before, during, and after neurological surgeries, including surgeries of the central (CNS) and peripheral nervous systems (PNS). The field has undergone extensive development since the 1960s correlating with the ability to measure intracranial pressure (ICP), cerebral blood flow (CBF), and cerebral metabolic rate (CMR).

== History ==
In 1961, a working group, the Commission on Neuroanesthesia, was created sponsored by the World Federation of Neurology. The first textbook on neuroanesthesiology was published in 1964 by Andrew R. Hunter from Manchester, UK, which promoted the founding of the field. In 1965, Hunter and Dr. Allan Brown of Edinborough founded the Neuroanesthesia Traveling Club of Great Britain and Ireland. The first American organization for neuroanesthesiology met on June 15, 1973, in Philadelphia, PA and was named the Neurosurgical Anesthesia Society (NAS). It consisted of 36 anesthesiologists, including Maurice Albin, and 4 neurosurgeons, including Thomas W. Langfitt. It was renamed the Society of Neurosurgical Anesthesia and Neurological Supportive Care (SNANSC) in October, 1973, and finally the Society of Neurosurgical Anesthesia and Critical Care (SNACC) in 1986.

== Practice ==
Neurosurgical anesthesiologists specialize in the care of patients with diverse conditions including but not limited to aneurysms, arteriovenous malformations, intracranial tumors, intractable epilepsy, head injuries, stereotactic procedures, neuroradiological procedures, pediatric neurosurgery and spine surgery.

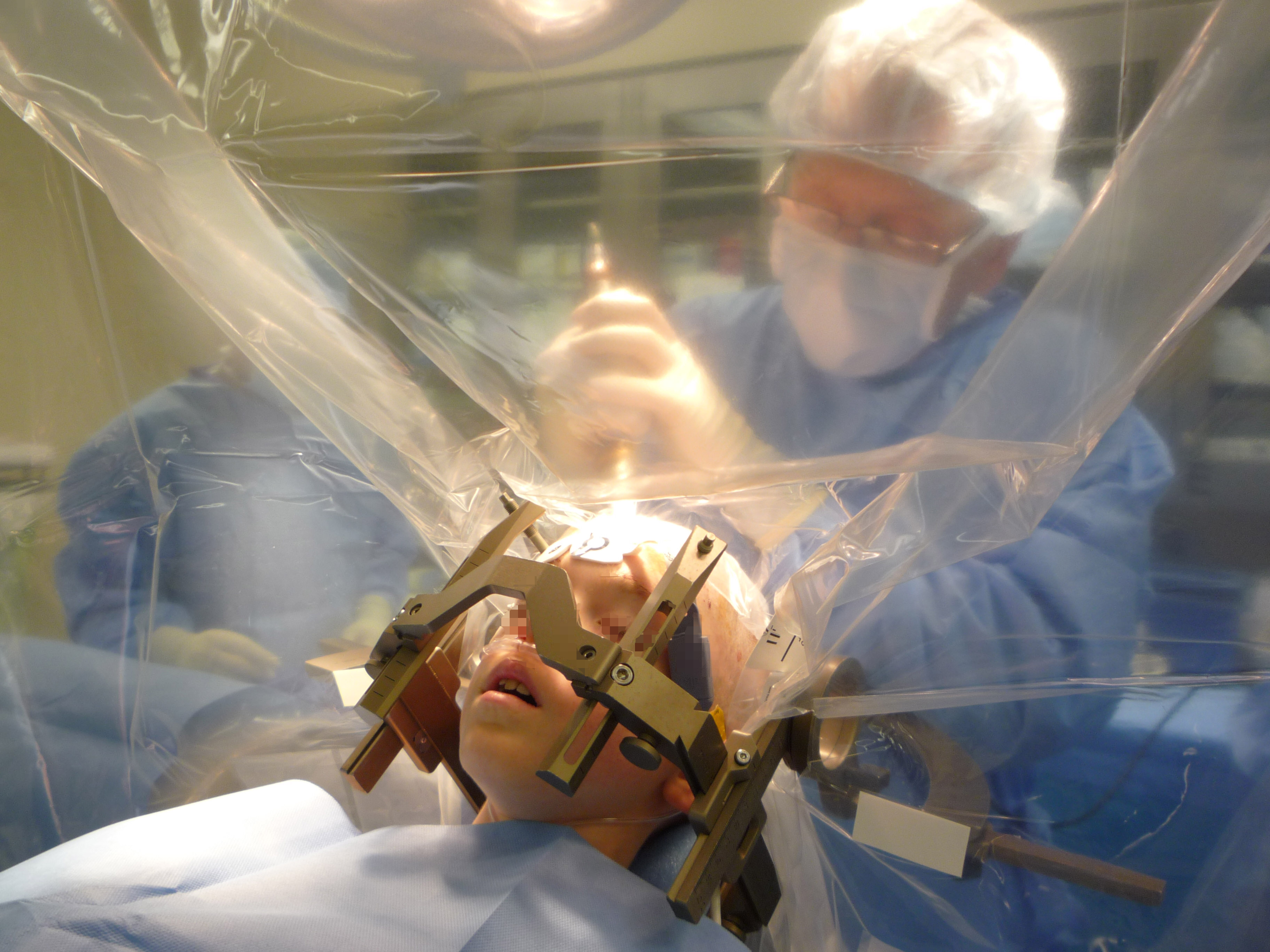
Pediatric Deep Brain Stimulation surgery

In addition to standard anesthesthetic management of patients undergoing surgery, neurosurgical procedures require the anesthesiologist to have a strong knowledge base of neuroanatomy, neurophysiology, and understand advanced monitoring techniques including neuromonitoring of the brain and spinal cord. It is impossible to routinely "monitor" the effects of drugs on CBF (cerebral blood flow), CMR, or ICP (intra-cranial pressure) as there is no neuroanesthetic equivalent of the pulmonary artery catheter or the transesophageal echocardiograph that permits a wide range of cerebral physiologic and pharmacologic effects to be followed easily.

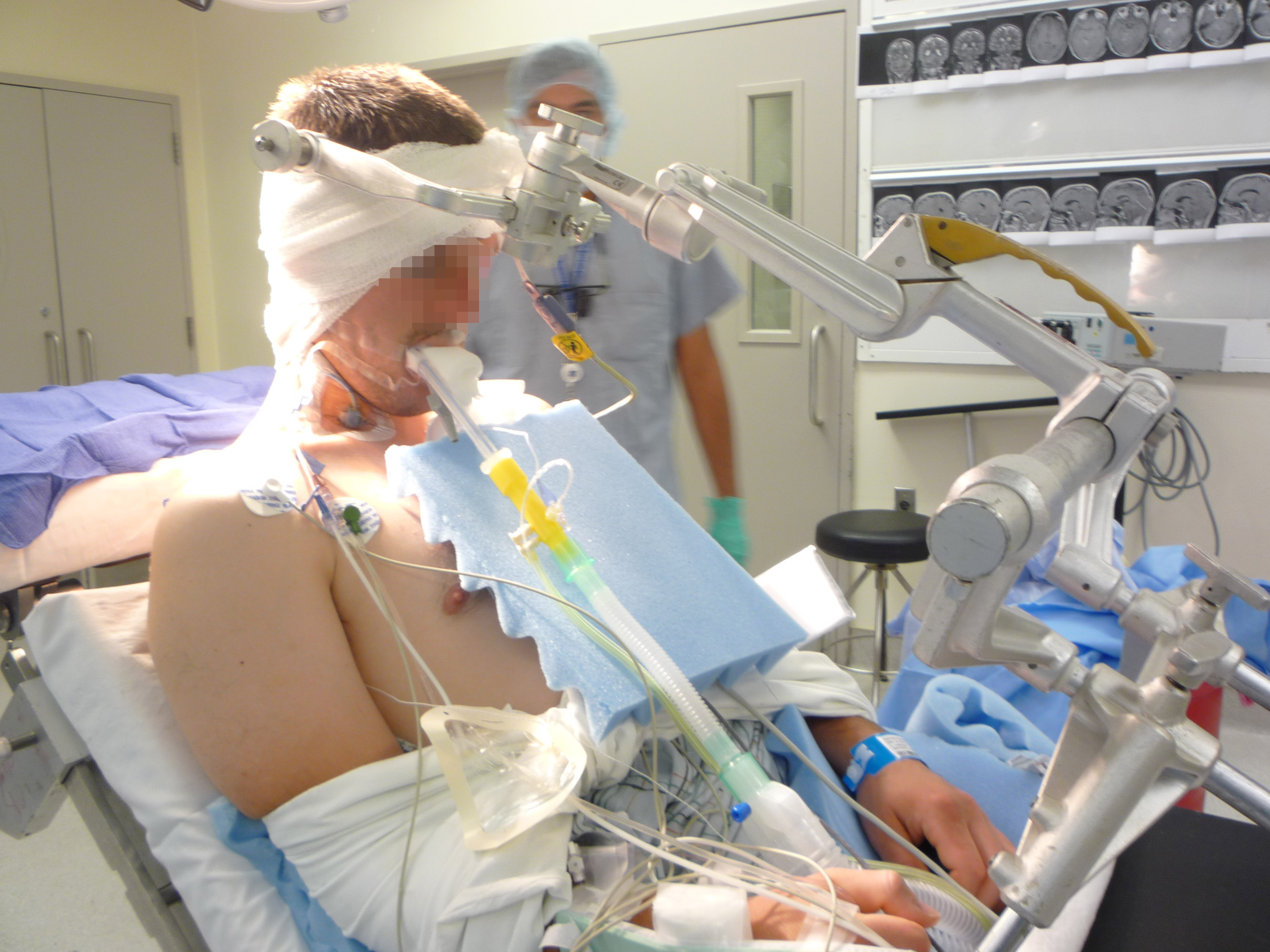
Tumor resection surgery from posterior fossa

== Training ==
After satisfactory completion of Accreditation Council for Graduate Medical Education (ACGME) accredited residency program in anesthesiology formal advanced training in Neurosurgical Anesthesia is available as a 1 or 2 -year fellowship integrating research, teaching and clinical experience. Although fellowships differ slightly at various institutions, they generally involve the fellow in participating in 12–24 months of research (either clinical or basic sciences), participation in advanced cases in the neurosurgical O.R.s and interventional radiology suites, and develop experience in performance and interpretation of neuromonitoring. Neurosurgical anesthesia fellows may also rotate in neurosurgical intensive care unit and gain experience with transcranial doppler, basic EEG interpretation and Licox/Microdialysis interpretation. Some institutions also allow the fellow to participate in education and teaching efforts for neurosurgical departments in developing countries.

In 2021, the Association of University Anesthesiologists (AUA) announced the development of a new international curriculum for standardized neuroanesthesiology fellowship training developed in partnership with SNACC and accredited by the International Council on Perioperative Neuroscience Training (ICPNT).

== Controversy surrounding fellowship accreditation ==
Despite its more than 60-year history, there are no ACGME-accredited or American Board of Medical Specialties (ABMS)-accredited neuroanesthesiology fellowships, as of 2021. There has been widespread debate in medical societies and the peer-reviewed literature concerning the need for formal subspecialty training for anesthesiologists who staff neurosurgical cases.

== Notable Physicians ==
- Andrew R. Hunter - British anesthesiologist and author of the first textbook in neuroanesthesiology.
- Thomas W. Langfitt - American neurosurgeon, former Professor and Chief of the Division of Neurosurgery at the University of Pennsylvania, and cofounder of the Neurosurgical Anesthesia Society (NAS), now SNACC.
- R.G.B. Gilbert - Canadian anesthesiologist, former Chair of the Department of Anesthetics at McGill University, former Director of the Montreal Neurological Institute, author of first Canadian book in neuroanesthesiology.
- Maurice Albin - American anesthesiologist, cofounder of SNACC, and considered a founding father of neuroanesthesiology.
- George A. Mashour - American anesthesiologist; Chair, Anesthesiology Robert B. Sweet Professor of Anesthesiology and Professor of Neurosurgery at University of Michigan Medical School.
- Emery N. Brown - the Warren M. Zapol Professor of Anaesthesia at Harvard Medical School (HMS) and Massachusetts General Hospital (MGH), Edward Hood Taplin Professor of Medical Engineering and of Computational Neuroscience, Massachusetts Institute of Technology; former Anesthetist-in-Chief at MGH.
- Oluwaseun Johnson-Akeju - current Anesthetist-in-Chief at MGH and Henry Isaiah Dorr Associate Professor of Research and Teaching in Anaesthetics and Anaesthesia at HMS.
