= World Federation of Societies of Anaesthesiologists =

International federation of professional associations

- Founded: 1955
- Headquarters: London, United Kingdom
- Members: 142 national societies
- President: Daniela Filipescu
- Website: www.wfsahq.org

The World Federation of Societies of Anaesthesiologists (WFSA) is an international federation of independent national professional associations of anaesthesiologists. The WFSA's Secretariat is based in London, UK.

The WFSA is the foremost global alliance of anaesthesiologists, and through a federation of 135 Member Societies, unites anaesthesiologists from 145 countries around the world to improve patient care and access to safe anaesthesia and perioperative medicine. Every two years the WFSA and a Member Society host the World Congress of Anaesthesiologists, in 2024 the Congress was held in Singapore and WCA 2026 will be held in Morocco. with the current meeting (delayed from 2020 due to COVID) being held in Prague in 2021, and the next meeting scheduled for Singapore in 2024.

The WFSA is a Non-State Actor in Official Liaison with the World Health Organization (WHO) and has consultative status with UN-ECOSOC. The WFSA is founding member of the G4 Alliance, and a founder and supporter of Lifebox.

In 2018, the WFSA published the WHO-WFSA International Standards for a Safe Practice of Anesthesia alongside the WHO for the first time, published jointly in the Canadian Journal of Anesthesia and Anesthesia & Analgesia. These Standards are applicable to all anaesthesia providers throughout the world. They are intended to provide guidance and assistance to anaesthesia providers, their professional organisations, hospital and facility administrators, and governments for maintaining and improving the quality and safety of anaesthesia care.

The WFSA Global Anesthesia Workforce Survey, published in September 2017 in Anesthesia & Analgesia, was a workforce survey conducted during 2015 and 2016. The aim of the survey was to collect detailed information on physician anaesthesia provider (PAP) and non-physician anaesthesia provider (NPAP) numbers, distribution, and training. Seventy-seven countries reported a PAP density of <5, with particularly low densities in the African and South-East Asia regions. NPAPs make up a large part of the global anaesthesia workforce, especially in countries with limited resources. Even when NPAPs are included, 70 countries had a total anaesthesia provider density of <5 per 100,000. Using current population data, over 136,000 additional PAPs would be needed immediately to achieve a minimum density of 5 per 100,000 population in all countries. Following the publication of the Survey, the WFSA published an easy-to-use WFSA Workforce Map on their website, an ongoing open source project to map the global anaesthesia workforce.

The WFSA publishes the peer reviewed Anaesthesia Tutorial of the Week every two weeks, which is an online open access educational resource with the aim of supporting anaesthesia training throughout the world, particularly in areas where access to journals and learning material is limited. The WFSA's official academic journal is Update in Anaesthesia.

The WFSA offers Fellowship Training Programmes for young anaesthetists from low income countries around the world. Currently there are 52 Fellowships across Latin America, Asia, Europe, Africa and Pan-Arab, and North America. The WFSA also offers Scholarships for young anaesthetists on low incomes and working in less affluent countries to attend WFSA World and Regional Congresses.

The WFSA delivers courses and training programmes to strengthen the global capacity for safe anaesthesia and pain management. These training programmes include Safer Anaesthesia From Education (SAFE) Courses, developed by the WFSA and the Association of Anaesthetists (AAGBI), and Essential Pain Management.

The WFSA co-ordinates the Palestinian Anaesthesia Teaching Mission (PATM) which enables volunteers to provide targeted teaching to anaesthesiologists and clinicians across hospitals in Palestine. The WFSA is partnered with the Royal College of Anaesthetists (RCoA) to offer qualified anaesthetists/intensivists from Kenya, Zimbabwe, Ghana, Malawi and Nepal, who are in good standing with their National Society, the opportunity to enhance their skills and knowledge in the UK through the RCoA's Medical Training Initiative (MTI) scheme.
