= European Society of Anaesthesiology and Intensive Care =

Professional association

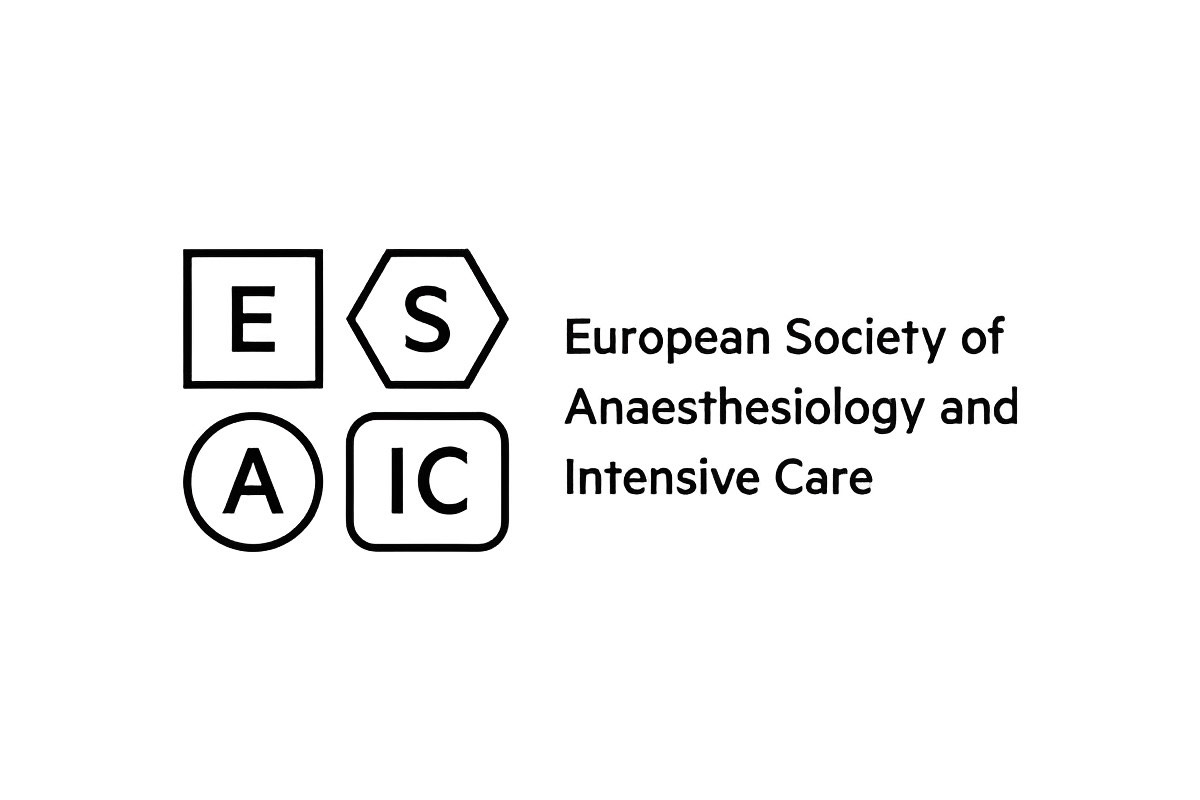
- Type: Professional Association
- Headquarters: Brussels, Belgium
- Location: Europe
- President: Prof. Wolfgang Buhre
- President-Elect: Prof. Idit Matot
- Website: esaic.org

The European Society of Anaesthesiology and Intensive Care is a European professional association of anaesthesiologists. It is also active across the fields of anaesthesia, emergency, intensive care, pain and perioperative medicine.

== History ==
It was formed in 2005 as the European Society of Anaesthesiology through the merger of three previous organisations: the European Academy of Anaesthesiology, dating from 1978; the European Society of Anaesthesiologists, established in 1992; and the Confederation of European National Societies of Anaesthesiology.

The decision to merge these three societies into a single international European anaesthesia organisation resulted from discussions in 1998. The leadership of the three societies signed the agreement for amalgamation on April 19, 2004, after receiving approval from the General Assemblies of all three organisations.

In 2020 the name was changed to the European Society of Anaesthesiology and Intensive Care (ESAIC), reflecting the expansion of the activities of the organisation into intensive care medicine, particularly in the context of the COVID-19 pandemic when anesthesiologists played a pivotal role in providing medical care in temporary COVID-19 ICUs. This name change aimed to reflect the vital role of anesthesiologists in intensive care medicine, which had become increasingly prominent. The new society, ESAIC, outlined its aims and activities in its first by-laws.

== Research ==
ESAIC conducts research in various areas, including perioperative medicine, anaesthetic techniques and monitoring, intensive care medicine, pain management, patient safety and quality improvement, education and training, ethics and professionalism, and health services research. The society's research aims to advance knowledge and improve patient care in anaesthesiology and intensive care.

The organisation provides funding for research projects, sponsors research initiatives, and collaborates with other organisations to advance the field of anaesthesiology and intensive care.

== Clinical practice guidelines ==
ESAIC develops evidence-based clinical practice guidelines for managing various conditions and procedures in anaesthesiology and intensive care.

The European Journal of Anaesthesiology, the academic journal of the society, was established in 1983; it is published by Wolters Kluwer, and is an open-access journal, the European Journal of Anaesthesiology and Intensive Care.

ESAIC also publishes other journals and newsletters, including the European Journal of Pain Supplements, the ESA Newsletter, and the Patient Safety Newsletter.

== Operations ==
ESAIC operates under the governance of a Board of Directors, a Council, and the General Assembly. The Council consists of representatives elected by Active Members from each European country with a minimum of 25 Active Members, while the Board of Directors is elected by the Council. The General Assembly convenes during the ESAIC's European Anaesthesiology Congress.

== Education and examination ==
The ESAIC also collaborates with the European Union of Medical Specialists (UEMS) and the European Board of Anaesthesiology (EBA) to protect its members' interests and improve the quality of education in the field. It maintains and develops activities previously established by the European Academy of Anaesthesiology (EAA), such as the Examination for European Diploma in Anaesthesiology (EDA, later EDAIC) to ensure high standards within the speciality, and the Hospital Visiting Programme to ensure proper teaching and training conditions in training centres, following the EBA training guidelines.

The European Diploma in Anaesthesiology and Intensive Care examination (EDAIC), is a two-part exam that evaluates knowledge of basic sciences and clinical subjects. It is considered an end-of-training assessment. The EBA (UEMS), and CESMA endorsed the exam, acknowledging its relevance in assessing anaesthesiologists' specialist skills.

=== Educational resources ===
- E-Learning: ESAIC offers an extensive e-learning platform which provides online educational courses, modules, and webinars.
- Online Library: ESAIC maintains an online library that provides access to a wide range of resources, including scientific articles, guidelines, educational materials, and presentations.
- Training and Courses: ESAIC supports various educational initiatives, including training programs, workshops, and courses on specific topics within anaesthesiology and intensive care.

== Euroanaesthesia ==
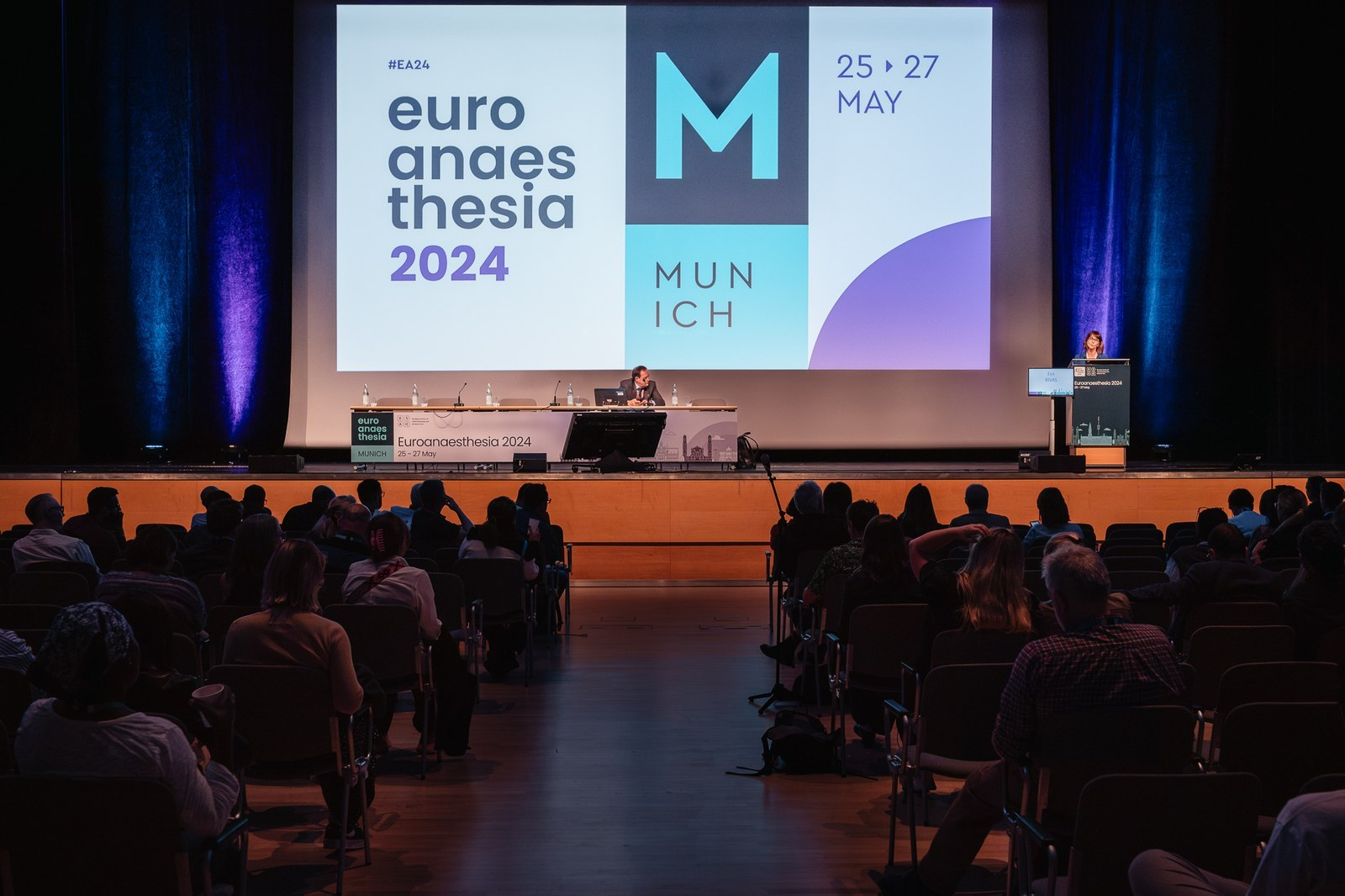
The stage for Euroanaesthesia 2024 in Munich

ESAIC organises the annual congress called Euroanaesthesia. It is one of Europe's largest gatherings of anaesthesiologists and intensive care specialists. With a history of international participants from more than 100 countries and over 130 exhibitors, Euroanaesthesia is an international platform for pioneering and advancing innovations in anaesthesiology. The congress provides a forum for the presentation of new research, the discussion of clinical issues, and the exchange of ideas and best practices. The Euroanaesthesia 2025 was held in Lisbon, Portugal.
