= Mike Grocott =

British virologist

- Education: St George's, University of London (BSc MBBS) University College London (MD)
- Scientific career
- Fields: Perioperative Care; Perioperative Medicine; Critical Care; Integrative Physiology; Hypoxia; Clinical Trials; Health Services Research
- Workplaces: University of Southampton; NIHR Biomedical Research Centre
- Thesis: Measuring morbidity after major surgery (2010)
- Academic advisors: Monty Mythen, Kathy Rowan

Mike Grocott is professor of anaesthesia and critical care medicine at the University of Southampton and director of the National Institute for Health and Care Research's (NIHR) Southampton Biomedical Research Centre (2022-28). He is an NIHR Senior Investigator (2018-26) and was national specialty group lead for Anaesthesia Perioperative Medicine and Pain within the NIHR Clinical Research Network (2015-2021). He is a consultant in critical care medicine at University Hospital Southampton NHS Foundation Trust.. He is president of the Perioperative Quality Initiative (POQI), an international, multidisciplinary non-profit that organizes expert consensus conferences on topics related to perioperative medicine with the aim of improving patient care.

Grocott was an elected council member and trustee of the Royal College of Anaesthetists (2016-2026) and served as vice-president (2019–20). He founded the national Centre for Perioperative Care (CPOC) and was vice-chair of the CPOC board (2020-25).

He served as the chair of the board of the National Institute of Academic Anaesthesia (NIAA) (2018-2024) and was previously the founding director of the NIAA Health Services Research Centre at the Royal College of Anaesthetists (2011-2016) and founding chair of the HQIP funded National Emergency Laparotomy Audit (2012-2017).

In 2007 Grocott summited Everest as leader of the Caudwell Xtreme Everest medical research expedition and is the founding chair of the Xtreme Everest Oxygen Research Consortium.

He lives in the New Forest with his wife, Professor Denny Levett, three children and a "working" Cocker Spaniel.
