= European Journal of Anaesthesiology =

- Discipline: Anaesthesiology
- Language: English
- Edited by: Martin R. Tramèr

Publication details
- History: 1984–present
- Publisher: Lippincott Williams & Wilkins
- Frequency: Monthly
- Impact factor: 4.140 (2018)

Standard abbreviations
- ISO 4: Eur. J. Anaesthesiol.

Indexing
- CODEN: EJANEG
- ISSN: 0265-0215 (print); 1365-2346 (web)
- OCLC no.: 11092625

Links
- Journal homepage; Online access; Online archive

The European Journal of Anaesthesiology is a peer-reviewed medical journal published on behalf of the European Society of Anaesthesiology that focuses on research related to anaesthesiology. It was established in 1984 and initially published by Blackwell Science and then from 2005 until 2008 by Cambridge University Press. Currently it is published by Lippincott Williams & Wilkins.

The journal is abstracted and indexed in MEDLINE.

According to the Journal Citation Reports, the journal has a 2018 impact factor of 4.140, ranking it 6th out of 31 journals in the category "Anesthesiology".
