= Pre-hospital emergency medicine =

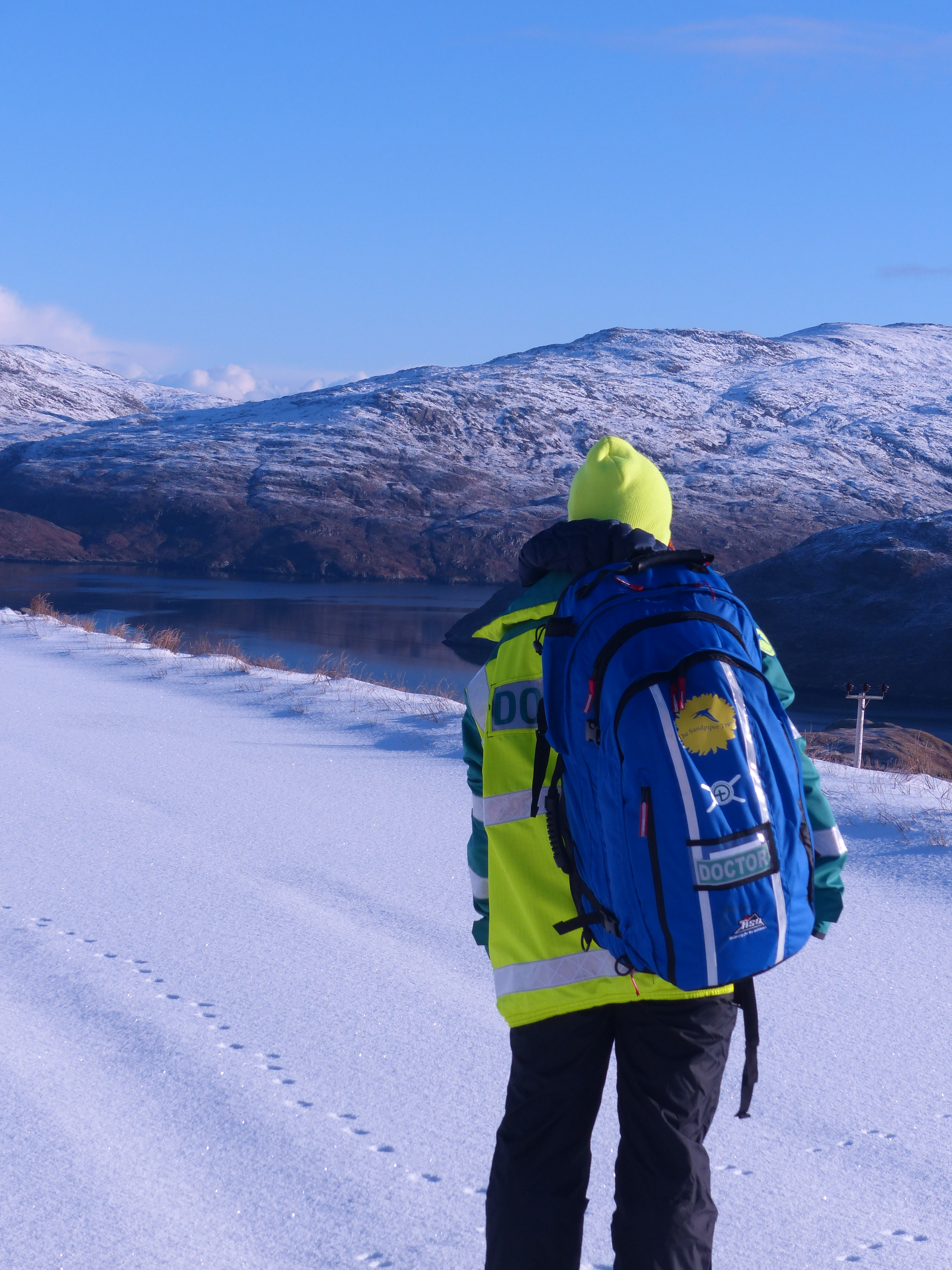
- A prehospital emergency medicine doctor in Scotland
- System: Acute illness and injury
- Significant diseases: Trauma; Acute illness
- Specialist: Pre-hospital emergency physician

Pre-hospital emergency medicine (abbreviated PHEM), also referred to as pre-hospital care, immediate care, or emergency medical services medicine (abbreviated EMS medicine), is a medical subspecialty which focuses on caring for seriously ill or injured patients before they reach hospital, and during emergency transfer to hospital or between hospitals. It may be practised by physicians from various backgrounds such as anaesthesiology, emergency medicine, intensive care medicine and acute medicine, after they have completed initial training in their base specialty.

Doctors practising PHEM are usually well-integrated with local emergency medical services, and are dispatched together with emergency medical technicians or paramedics where potentially life-threatening trauma or illness is suspected that may benefit from immediate specialist medical treatment. This may involve travelling by car or air ambulance to the site.

== Training ==
=== Europe ===
The European Training Requirement curriculum for anaesthesia was updated in 2018 to state that the knowledge, clinical skills and specific attitudes of pre-hospital emergency medicine form part of the core domain of critical emergency medicine and, as such, should form part of postgraduate training for doctors specialising in anaesthesia.

==== United Kingdom ====
In the United Kingdom, pre-hospital emergency medicine (PHEM) was recognised as a subspecialty of emergency medicine and anaesthetics in July 2011 by the General Medical Council. From February 2015, this was extended to intensive care medicine and acute medicine. The formal PHEM training programme can be entered at ST5, and above, after gaining enough experience in emergency medicine, intensive care medicine, acute medicine and anaesthetics. The training programme offers three schemes including 12 months full-time in PHEM, and 24 months blended with a base speciality. Trainees are expected to complete the DIMC and FIMC exams from the Royal College of Surgeons of Edinburgh. Successful training and TAP leads to a CCT in PHEM as a subspecialty. Once a doctor has completed their training, opportunities include working for an Ambulance Service Trust as a Medical Emergency Response Incident Team (MERIT) doctor or in another major incident medical role, volunteering for a local British Association for Immediate Care (BASICS) scheme, or working for an Air Ambulance service, often working alongside Advanced Paramedics with training in Critical Care.

Many general practitioners and specialists in fields other than emergency medicine, anaesthesia, acute medicine and intensive care provide regular PHEM services in the United Kingdom, however are excluded from sub-specialty training. Indeed in the United Kingdom, the speciality of pre-hospital emergency medicine was in essence created and pioneered by general practitioners.

==== Switzerland ====
In Switzerland, PHEM has been recognized as a subspecialty of Emergency Medicine since 2002 by the postgraduate council of the Swiss Medical Association (FMH). Training is usually undertaken following an initial two-year training in Emergency Medicine, which in itself can only be taken after having first successfully completed a board-certification in internal medicine, surgery, intensive care or anesthesiology. Currently optional, this board-certification will eventually become mandatory for all physicians aiming to work in both Emergency Departments and PHEM (though this is subject to considerable vetoing pressure from other specialist boards).

=== North America ===
==== United States of America ====
In the United States, the American Board of Emergency Medicine has awarded subspecialty certification in EMS medicine since 2013 and American prehospital physicians may join the National Association for EMS Physicians (NAEMSP).

== Pre-hospital trauma assessment ==
Pre-hospital trauma assessment is a set of skills used by emergency medical services technicians to analyze all threats to life that a patient could suffer due to a trauma incident. Pre-hospital trauma assessment is broken into two major types: basic trauma assessment and advanced trauma assessment. The basic assessment is provided by first responders and EMTs. The advanced assessment is provided by a paramedic.

Approaching and sizing up a trauma incident scene is one of the most important primary steps that a pre-hospital care provider carefully does. Within a critical trauma incident, seeing hazardous material and traffic in an uncontrolled environment is expected. These factors can cause life-threats for providers, coworkers, and bystanders. Therefore, controlling all these life-threats is initially accomplished even before patient contact.

After scene management, a pre-hospital care provider gets a general impression of the scene. A general impression is discovered by evaluating the mechanism of injury. For example, in a car accident, mechanism of injury is detected by estimating the speed at which the collision occurred, looking at the amount of damage, and looking for other factors that may affect the mechanism of injury, such as airbag deployment.

== Ongoing assessment ==
The en route assessment starts when the patient is loaded in the ambulance. En route assessment begins with a repeat of the initial assessment and ensuring that the patient still has a patent airway, breathes or is being properly ventilated, and has a pulse. For stable patients, ongoing care is then provided aligned to prolonged field care guidelines.

== See also ==
- BASICS Scotland
- British Association for Immediate Care
- Highland PICT Team
- Global Prehospital Consortium
