= Geoff Lester =

Australian physician

Geoff Lester is an Australian physician, researcher, patient advocate and health economist. Lester's is an ambassador for the National Heart Foundation of Australia.. He has been featured in national media for his advocacy role in cardiovascular health, internal medicine, perioperative care, and patient advocacy, particularly in aortic disease awareness and premature cardiovascular disease.

== Early life and education ==
Lester grew up in rural South Australia before travelling to London and returning to Australia to study economics. He then studied medicine following his first of four aortic dissections that required emergency surgery. He completed his basic physician training at Royal Prince Alfred Hospital, Sydney and Alfred Hospital, Melbourne, undertaking training in cardiology, internal medicine, perioperative medicine, and vascular medicine. He holds a Master of Public Health and a Master of Philosophy, with a thesis focused on the epidemiology, mortality, and economic burden of thoracic aortic disease.

== Career ==
Lester practises as a consultant vascular and perioperative physician in Victoria, Australia. His special interest is aortic disease. He is a senior lecturer at Monash University where he studies the economic modelling of perioperative medicine services.

Advocacy and public engagement

In 2024, he became the first Australian to lead the 'THINK Aorta' campaign across Asia–Pacific. In 2025 he was appointed to the board of Heart4Heart, an Australian patient-led charity.

== Personal life ==
Lester is married with one child. His brother has also had prophylactic aortic surgery.
