= Mary Burnell =

Australian physician (1907–1996)

- Born: Mary Taylor Angel; February 21, 1907
- Died: August 25, 1996 (aged 89)
- Occupation: Anaesthetist

Mary Burnell (February 21, 1907 - August 25, 1996) was an anaesthetist who worked with both adults and children. She is known for her work advocating for pediatric anaesthesia specialists.

== Early life and education ==
Mary Taylor Angel was born on February 21, 1907, in Norwood, South Australia. For schooling she first attended the St Peters Collegiate Girls School. Upon graduated, she began at the University of Adelaide where she first studied science before shifting to medicine. She received her degree in 1931.

== Career ==
After graduation, she became a resident medical officer at the Adelaide Children’s Hospital in 1932 and 1933. She was the first woman to join the newly-founded Australian Society of Anaesthetists in 1935, and in 1937 she withdrew from medicine to focus on her domestic life. With the advent of World War II, she re-started her work in medicine at the Royal Adelaide Hospital. During this time she was the only anaesthetist at the hospital.

In 1953 Burnell was elected as president of the Australian Society of Anaesthetists and in 1966 she was named dean of the Faculty of Anaesthetists, the first woman to hold the position of dean.

== Awards and honors ==
In 1955 she was elected to the Royal Australasian College of Surgeons, where she would be named an honorary life member in 1973. In 1968, she was also awarded a fellowship of the Faculty of Anaesthetists by the Royal College of Surgeons in recognition of her efforts in fostering overseas connections.

== Personal life ==
She married G.H. Burnell, one of her tutors in medicine at Adelaide University, in 1934.
