= CREM =

CREM may refer to:

- CREM, a gene which encodes for the cAMP responsive element modulator protein
- Critical emergency medicine, a subspecialty of anaesthesiology focused on immediately life-threatening emergencies
- Corpo Reali Equipaggi Marittimi
