= International Anesthesia Research Society =

Professional medical organization

The International Anesthesia Research Society (IARS) is an international, professional medical society dedicated to improving clinical care, education and research in anesthesia, pain management, and perioperative medicine. It was founded in 1922 by Francis Hoeffer McMechan.

The IARS is owner of Anesthesia & Analgesia (published by Lippincott Williams & Wilkins), and also sponsor the OpenAnesthesia website. They are also part of a joint project with the U.S. Food and Drug Administration called SmartTots (formerly called Safekids) to study the effects of anesthesia on the developing nervous systems of infants and young children.

The IARS is affiliated with eight medical societies: The Society of Cardiovascular Anesthesiologists, the Society for Pediatric Anesthesia, the Society for Ambulatory Anesthesia, the International Society for Anaesthetic Pharmacology, the Society for Technology in Anesthesia, the Anesthesia Patient Safety Foundation, the Society of Critical Care Anesthesiologists, and the Society for Obstetric Anesthesia and Perinatology. Anesthesia & Analgesia serves as the official journal for all of these societies.

== OpenAnesthesia ==
OpenAnesthesia is a website founded by Dr. Robert Thiele and Dr. Ed Nemergut that debuted in July 2009. Its goal is to advance graduate medical education in anesthesia and it is sponsored by the International Anesthesia Research Society. Since its inception as an experimental project, OpenAnesthesia has grown to be a comprehensive resource for anesthesiology residents, nurse anesthetists, and physician anesthesiologists.
