= Surgical Care Improvement Project =

The Surgical Care Improvement Project (SCIP) partnership is an American multi-year national campaign to substantially reduce surgical mortality and morbidity through collaborative efforts between healthcare organizations. The campaign began in August 2005 with the original goal of reducing the national incidence of surgical complications by 25% by the year 2010.

== A Partnership for Better Surgical Care ==
The SCIP is a national partnership of organizations committed to improving the safety of surgical care through the reduction of postoperative complications. These complications can take a toll on patients' health and safety and can extend postoperative hospital stays or care (such as therapy).

Initiated in 2003 by CMS and the CDC, the SCIP partnership is coordinated through a steering committee of 10 national organizations. More than 20 organizations provide expertise to the steering committee through a technical expert panel. The project's steering committee is composed of members from the following national organizations:

- Agency for Healthcare Research and Quality
- American College of Surgeons
- American Hospital Association
- American Society of Anesthesiologists
- Association of periOperative Registered Nurses
- Centers for Disease Control and Prevention
- Centers for Medicare & Medicaid Services
- Department of Veterans Affairs
- Institute for Healthcare Improvement
- Joint Commission on Accreditation of Healthcare Organizations

== Process measures ==
SCIP measures have been added and subtracted since the creation of the project. As the Joint Commission has implemented Oryx Performance Measures, all of the SCIP measures were retired by December 31, 2015.

=== Infection ===
- SCIP-INF-1: Prophylactic antibiotic prophylaxis received within 1 h prior to surgical incision
- SCIP-INF-2: Prophylactic antibiotic selection for surgical patients (added 2007)
- SCIP-INF-3: Prophylactic antibiotics discontinued within 24 h after surgery end time (48 h for cardiac patients)
- SCIP-INF-4: Cardiac surgery patients with controlled 6 A.M. postoperative serum glucose management (≤200 mg/dL) (added 2008)
- SCIP-INF-5: Postoperative surgical site infection diagnosed during index hospitalization
- SCIP-INF-6: Surgery patients with appropriate hair removal (added in 2008, retired in 2011)
- SCIP-INF-7: Colorectal surgery patients with immediate postoperative normothermia (added 2009)
- SCIP-INF-8: Short half-life prophylactic administered preoperatively re-dosed within 4 h after preoperative dose (proposed 2010)
- SCIP-INF-9: Urinary catheter removed on postoperative day 1 (POD 1) or postoperative day 2 (POD 2) with day of surgery being day zero (added 2011)
- SCIP-INF-10: Surgery patients with perioperative temperature management (added 2011)

=== Cardiac ===
- SCIP-Card-1: Non-cardiac vascular surgery patients with evidence of coronary artery disease who received beta-blockers during the perioperative period
- SCIP-Card-2: Surgery patients on beta-blocker therapy prior to arrival who

received a beta-blocker during the perioperative period

- SCIP-Card-3: Intraoperative or postoperative acute myocardial infarction (AMI) diagnosed during index hospitalization or within 30 days of surgery

=== Venous thromboembolism ===
- SCIP-VTE-1: Surgery patients with recommended venous thromboembolism prophylaxis ordered
- SCIP-VTE-2: Surgery patients who received appropriate venous thromboembolism prophylaxis within 24 hours prior to surgery to 24 hours after surgery
- SCIP-VTE-3: Inoperative or postoperative pulmonary embolism (PE) diagnosed during index hospitalization or within 30 days of surgery
- SCIP-VTE-4: Inoperative or postoperative deep vein thrombosis (DVT) diagnosed during index hospitalization or within 30 days of surgery

=== Global ===
- SCIP-Global-1: Death within 30 days of surgery
- SCIP-Global-2: Readmission within 30 days of surgery

=== Vascular ===
- SCIP-VA-1: Proportion of permanent hospital ESRD vascular access procedures that are autogenous AV fistulas (from administrative claims data)

=== Respiratory ===
- SCIP-Resp-1: Number of days ventilated surgery patients had documentation of the head of the bed (HOB) being elevated from recovery end date (day zero) through postoperative day seven
- SCIP-Resp-2: Patients diagnosed with postoperative ventilator-associated pneumonia (VAP) during index hospitalization
- SCIP-Resp-3: Number of days ventilated surgery patients had documentation of stress ulcer disease (SUD) prophylaxis from recovery end date (day zero) through postoperative day seven
- SCIP-Resp-4: Surgery patients whose medical record contained an order for a ventilator weaning program (protocol or clinical pathway)

== See also ==
- Source of info on specifications of SCIP and other core measures
- Patient safety
- Perioperative mortality
- ASA physical status classification system or preoperative physical fitness
