= Pain Medicine (journal) =

- Discipline: Pain management
- Language: English
- Edited by: Robert W. Hurley

Publication details
- History: 2000-present
- Publisher: Oxford University Press
- Frequency: 12/year
- Impact factor: 3.750 (2020)

Standard abbreviations
- ISO 4: Pain Med.

Indexing
- CODEN: PMAEAP
- ISSN: 1526-2375 (print); 1526-4637 (web)
- LCCN: 99008981
- OCLC no.: 884090837

Links
- Journal homepage; Online access; Online archive

Pain Medicine is a peer-reviewed medical journal covering pain management. It was established in 2000 and is published twelve times per year by Oxford University Press. It is the official journal of the American Academy of Pain Medicine and the Faculty of Pain Medicine of the Australian and New Zealand College of Anaesthetists. The editor-in-chief is Robert W. Hurley (Wake Forest University). According to the journal's website, the journal has an impact factor of 3.637, and a 5-year impact factor of 3.721.
