= Australian Society of Anaesthetists =

Professional body of anaesthetists in Australia

- Abbreviation: ASA
- Formation: 1934
- Legal status: Professional Body
- Purpose: Supporting anaesthetists and ensuring the safest anaesthesia for the community.
- Headquarters: Sydney, Australia
- Region served: Australia
- Website: https://www.asa.org.au/

The Australian Society of Anaesthetists is an association that seeks to further the best interests of anaesthesia and anaesthetists.

== History ==
The Australian Society of Anaesthetists (ASA) was founded in 1934 by Geoffrey Kaye. It was established as a means to exchange ideas, for the distribution of memoranda on topics of anaesthetic interests, and to conduct inquiries relating to problems in the practice of anaesthesia in Australia. Mary Burnell (then Angel) was the first female member and the secretary of the South Australian Section of the Society in 1935.

== Membership ==
The Society has over 4000 members representing a majority of Australian specialist anaesthetists. Membership consists of specialist anaesthetist as well as registrar trainees and non-specialist general medical practitioner anaesthetists.

== Governance ==
The ASA is non-profit organisation registered with the Australian Charities and Not-for-profits Commission governed by a Board of volunteer members. The Council consists of the Board of Directors as well as state and territory chairs and representatives of select ASA committees.

== Meetings ==
The Society holds a National Scientific Conference annually in the southern hemisphere spring. Recent meetings have taken place in Melbourne, Darwin and Wellington. A wide variety of other meetings take place in the various states, such as educational meetings combined with the Australian and New Zealand College of Anaesthetists, Part 0 and Part 3 meetings for junior and senior trainees respectively and rural meetings that bring together specialist and general practitioner providers of anaesthesia.

== Publications ==
Anaesthesia and Intensive Care, published by SAGE Publishing, is the official journal of the Australian Society of Anaesthetists, the Australian and New Zealand Intensive Care Society and the New Zealand Society of Anaesthetists.

Australian Anaesthetist is the Society’s membership magazine. Produced four times a year, the magazine has a different theme each issue focusing on what is happening within the Society and across the Australian anaesthetic community.

The Relative Value Guide (RVG) provides comprehensive advice on billing and assists with deciphering the Medicare and private insurance rebate systems. The RVG is available exclusively to members in hardcopy, online PDF and as a mobile app.

== Related organisations ==
- New Zealand Society of Anaesthetists
- Australian and New Zealand College of Anaesthetists

== See also ==
- History of general anesthesia
