= Myocardial injury after non-cardiac surgery =

Medical concept

Myocardial injury after non-cardiac surgery, also known as MINS, refers to at least one elevated post-operative troponin level presumed to be of an ischemic mechanism. There is an absence of any overt non-ischemic causes to explain this elevation.
