= Anesthesia & Analgesia =

- Discipline: Anesthesiology
- Language: English
- Edited by: Jaideep Pandit

Publication details
- History: 1922-present
- Publisher: Lippincott Williams & Wilkins
- Frequency: Monthly
- Impact factor: 5.9 (2022)

Standard abbreviations
- ISO 4: Anesth. Analg.

Indexing
- CODEN: AACRAT
- ISSN: 0003-2999 (print); 1526-7598 (web)
- LCCN: 2004265703
- OCLC no.: 01481131

Links
- Journal homepage; Online access; Online archive

Anesthesia & Analgesia is a monthly peer-reviewed medical journal covering anesthesia, pain management, and perioperative medicine that was established in 1922.

It is published by Lippincott Williams & Wilkins on behalf of the International Anesthesia Research Society. Its editor-in-chief is Jaideep Pandit (St John's College, Oxford).

According to the Journal Citation Reports, the journal has a 2022 impact factor of 5.9, ranking it sixth out of 35 journals in the category "Anesthesiology".

A companion journal, A&A Practice is also published.

== See also ==
- List of medical journals
