= American Society of Anesthesiologists =

Medical association in the US

- Abbreviation: ASA
- Type: Professional association
- Purpose: "To raise and maintain the standards of the medical practice of anesthesiology and to improve patient care"
- Headquarters: 1061 American Lane Schaumburg, Illinois, 60173 U.S.
- Members: 63,000
- Official language: English
- President: Jeffrey T. Mueller, M.D., FASA
- Website: http://www.asahq.org

The American Society of Anesthesiologists (ASA) is a professional association of physicians in the field of anesthesiology.

As of 2026, the organization included more than 63,000 national and international members and has more than 100 full-time employees.

== History ==
Anesthesiology's roots date back to the mid-19th century. On March 30, 1842, Crawford Long, M.D. administered the first ether anesthetic for surgery and operated to remove a tumor from a patient's neck. After the surgery, the patient revealed that he felt nothing and was not aware the surgery was over until he awoke. This was the start of a specialty critical to modern medicine, anesthesiology.

In 1905, nine physicians (from Long Island, N.Y.) organized the first professional anesthesia society. In 1911, the Society expanded to 23 members and became the New York Society of Anesthetists. Over the next 25 years, involvement in anesthesia-related issues grew and attracted other interested physicians nationwide. In 1936, the Society changed its name to the American Society of Anesthetists. In 1945, the organization moved to become the American Society of Anesthesiologists (ASA). In 1960, the ASA established an Executive Office in Park Ridge, Illinois to meet growing membership and patient-care demands. In 2014, the ASA opened new headquarters in Schaumburg, Illinois.

=== Lobbying ===
The ASA has lobbied the U.S. Congress to pass several pieces of legislation both directly requiring that physicians supervise nurse anesthetists who administer anesthesia and indirectly encouraging this practice.

== Membership ==
Membership is open to holders of Doctor of Medicine (M.D.) or Doctor of Osteopathic Medicine (D.O.) degrees who are licensed practitioners and have successfully completed a training program in anesthesiology approved by the Accreditation Council for Graduate Medical Education (ACGME) or American Osteopathic Association (AOA).

The ASA also maintains an active resident component, medical student component as well as an anesthesiologist assistant component. Non-physician providers of anesthesia care (anesthesiologist assistants, nurse anesthetists, dentist, veterinarians, APRNs) can join as educational members.

== Governance ==
ASA is governed by its House of Delegates. The House of Delegates is composed of ASA delegates and directors (designated by geographic distribution), ASA officers, all past presidents, the Editor-in-Chief of the journal, the chairs of all sections, the chair of the ASA delegation to the American Medical Association House of Delegates and each member of the Resident Component Governing Council not to exceed five members and a non-voting member of the Medical Student component. The House of Delegates meets each year during the Society's Annual Meeting.

== Meetings ==
Meetings are held annually and are based on scientific progress in the anesthesiology fields.|

== Publications ==
The Society publishes multiple academic resources in the following categories:

- Practice Management
- Practice Parameters
- Continuing Education
- Patient Education
- Patient Safety/Risk Management and Quality Improvement
- Periodicals
  - ASA Monitor (newsletter)|
  - Anesthesiology
- Physician Booklets

=== Guidelines ===
ASA supports anesthesiologists and care team members with Standards, Practice Guidelines, Practice Advisories, Statements, Expert Consensus Documents, and Resources from ASA Committees. Practice standards are the minimum level of clinical practice as defined by ASA. Practice guidelines and advisories provide recommendations for patient care that are based on a systematic review of peer-reviewed published evidence. The difference between practice guidelines and advisories is the level of evidence supporting the recommendations. Recommendations in practice guidelines are typically supported by higher quality and quantity of evidence than those in practice advisories. ASA statements and expert consensus documents are guidance documents that are not supported by a systematic review but are often based on a collective opinion or consensus of a convened expert panel. These documents make recommendations on a broad range of topics, including care management of individual patients, systems of care, and professional comportment such as privileging and ethical behavior. All ASA practice guidelines, advisories, statements, and consensus documents are reviewed and approved by the ASA House of Delegates.

ASA also offers resources (work products) from ASA committees that cover a wide array of clinical and non-clinical topics. Committee resources have not been approved by the ASA Board of Directors or House of Delegates, and do not represent ASA policy, statements, or practice guidelines or advisories.

== Anesthesia subspecialties ==
While all anesthesiologists complete a minimum of eight years of medical training after college, some anesthesiologists have additional training (called a fellowship) in a specific area of anesthesiology. The ABA offers specific certifications in some of these areas. Anesthesiologists are not required to subspecialize, but many do focus on one area of care to further hone their expertise. These specialty areas include, but are not limited to:

- Ambulatory Anesthesia
- Cardiac Anesthesia
- Critical Care Anesthesia
- Geriatric Anesthesia
- Neuroanesthesia
- Obstetric Anesthesia
- Pain Medicine
- Pediatric Anesthesia
- Perioperative Anesthesia
- Professional Issues
- Regional and Acute Anesthesia
