= Critical emergency medicine =

Medical specialty

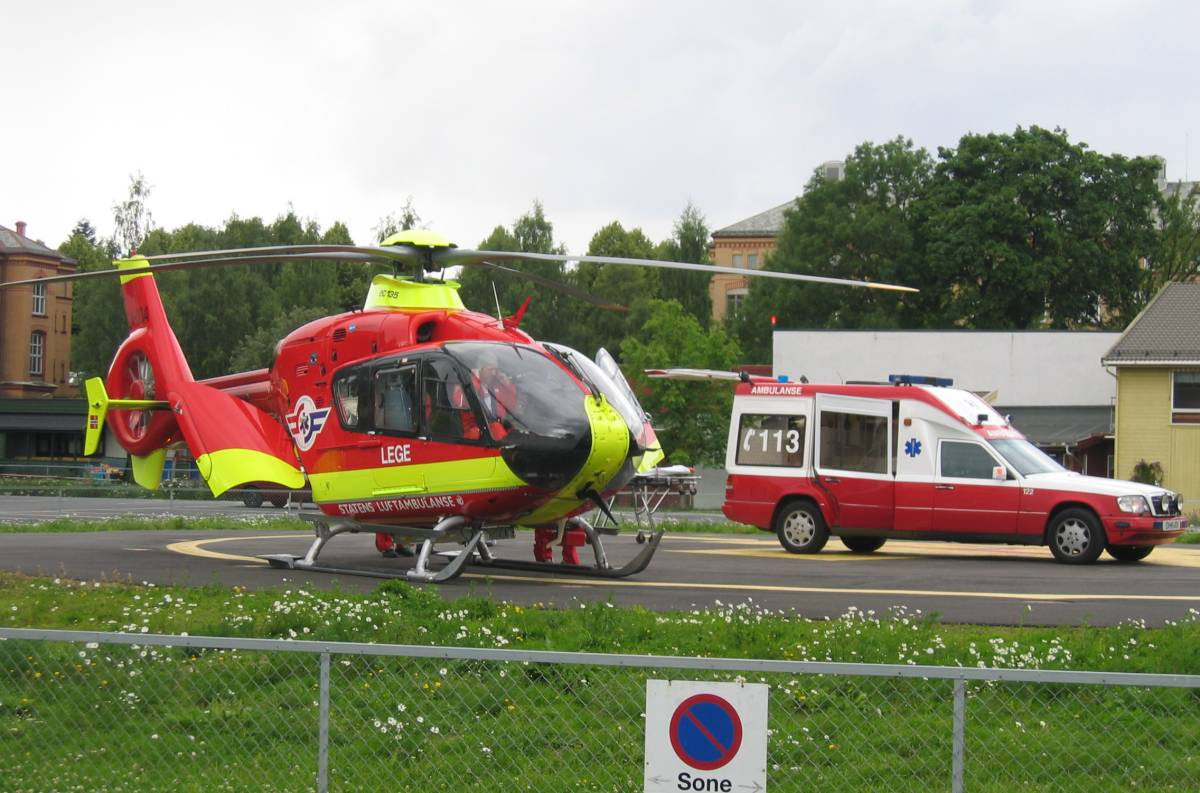
A medical helicopter providing CREM services, operated by Norsk Luftambulanse in Norway.

Critical emergency medicine (CREM) refers to the acute medical care of patients who have medical emergencies that pose an immediate threat to life, irrespective of location. In particular, the term is used to describe the role of anaesthesiologists in providing such care.

The term was introduced in 2010 in a position paper by the Scandinavian Society of Anaesthesiology and Intensive Care Medicine, who defined it as "immediate life support and resuscitation of critically ill and injured patients in the pre-hospital as well as hospital settings". It describes the roles and competencies of anaesthesiologists and intensive care physicians in caring for patients with life-threatening illness or injury who require resuscitation or support of their vital functions, particularly in Scandinavia and other parts of Europe. One reason the term was introduced was to distinguish these core activities from the broader internationally recognised medical specialty of emergency medicine; the latter deals with the acute care of a broad range of minor to major medical problems that present to an emergency department,.

The European Board of Anaesthesiology and European Society of Anaesthesiology formally adopted the term in 2016 "to define anaesthesiologists’ competencies and role in the acute management of life-threatening emergencies", which had previously been referred to in the anaesthesiology speciality European training requirements simply as "emergency medicine". The European Training Requirement curriculum for anaesthesiology was updated in 2018 to state that knowledge, clinical skills and specific attitudes for CREM should form part of postgraduate training for doctors specialising in anaesthesiology.

== Scope ==
The scope of CREM is broad, ranging from providing high-level clinical skills and decision making in the pre-hospital setting, through assisting in rescue work, managing life-threatening medical and surgical emergencies and participating in multidisciplinary in-hospital medical emergency teams and resuscitation teams, through to declaration of death at the site of an incident. Anaesthesiologists specialised in CREM may have additional experience in organising healthcare responses to mass-casualty incidents and disasters, as well as training in management of CBRN defence, hyperbaric medicine, or organisation and coordination of emergency departments, burn centres, poison control centres, or emergency medical services.

Internationally, there are two primary models of emergency medicine: the Anglo-American model, which relies on "bringing the patient to the hospital", and the Franco-German model, which operates through "bringing the hospital to the patient". In the Anglo-American model, the patient is rapidly transported by non-physician providers to definitive care, typically an emergency department in a hospital. Conversely, the Franco-German approach has a physician, traditionally an anesthesiologist but now more so an emergency physician, come to the patient and provide stabilizing care in the field. The patient is then triaged directly to the appropriate specialist department of a hospital. As such, CREM specialists must be expert in the principles of patient transfer, often by helicopter or aeroplane as well as by land ambulance, and should exhibit appropriate knowledge, skills and attitudes for working safely in the pre-hospital setting and managing the attendant risks, and communicating with firefighters, police and rescue workers.
