= Anesthesiology (journal) =

- Discipline: Anesthesiology
- Language: English
- Edited by: James P. Rathmell, MD, MBA

Publication details
- History: 1940-present
- Publisher: Lippincott Williams & Wilkins
- Frequency: Monthly
- Impact factor: 8.8 (2022)

Standard abbreviations
- ISO 4: Anesthesiology

Indexing
- ISSN: 0003-3022 (print); 1528-1175 (web)
- OCLC no.: 1481133

Links
- Journal homepage; Online archive

Anesthesiology is a monthly peer-reviewed medical journal founded in 1940. It publishes research aimed at improving clinical practice and fundamental understanding in anesthesiology: the practice of perioperative, critical care, and pain medicine. Anesthesiology is the official journal of the American Society of Anesthesiologists, but operates with complete editorial autonomy.

The journal runs a social media program and includes multimedia content in its issues to disseminate its published research more broadly.

The editor-in-chief is James P. Rathmell, and it is published by Lippincott Williams & Wilkins on behalf of the American Society of Anesthesiologists.

According to the Journal Citation Reports, the journal has a 2022 impact factor of 8.8, ranking it 3rd out of 63 journals in the category Anesthesiology.
