= Subspecialty =

Narrow field within a specialty

A subspecialty or subspeciality (see spelling differences) is a narrow field of professional knowledge/skills within a specialty of trade, and is most commonly used to describe the increasingly more diverse medical specialties. A subspecialist is a specialist of a subspecialty.

In medicine, subspecialization is particularly common in internal medicine, cardiology, neurology and pathology, psychiatry and has grown as medical practice has:

1. become more complex, and
2. it has become clear that a physician's case volume is negatively associated with their complication rate; that is, complications tend to decrease as the volume of cases per physician goes up.

== See also ==
- Medical specialty
