= Australian and New Zealand College of Anaesthetists =

Anaesthesia training and standards body for Australia and New Zealand

The Australian and New Zealand College of Anaesthetists
- Abbreviation: ANZCA
- Predecessor: Faculty of Anaesthetists (1952)
- Formation: 1992
- Purpose: Anaesthesia, pain medicine and perioperative medicine
- Headquarters: Melbourne, Australia
- Location: Australia
- Region served: Australia & New Zealand
- Official language: English
- Website: https://www.anzca.edu.au

The Australian and New Zealand College of Anaesthetists (ANZCA) is the medical college responsible for training, examining and qualifying anaesthetists and pain medicine specialists in Australia and New Zealand. The College maintains standards of practice in anaesthesia.

== Membership ==
The College has approximately 3200 fellows; about a fifth are female. Among current trainees, the gender ratio is nearly even. In addition to Australia and New Zealand, the College has accredited training hospitals in Hong Kong, Singapore and Malaysia. In all, nearly eight hundred trainees learn in 140 ANZCA-accredited hospitals worldwide.

== History ==
In 1952, the Australian Society of Anaesthetists, which had been established in 1934 to represent the emerging medical specialty of anaesthesia, was successful in establishing the Faculty of Anaesthetists within the Royal Australasian College of Surgeons to undertake higher professional training in the specialty. An interim board was made up of five Society nominees: Drs Renton, Travers and Gillespie from Victoria, Dr. Daly of Sydney and Dr. Troup of Perth; and two College nominees, Sir Victor Hurley and Mr Henry Searby. An Acting Board was constituted in June 1953 with Dr. Douglas Renton as Dean and Dr. Harry Daly as Vice-Dean. By 1992, the Faculty of Anaesthetists had grown to 2100 Fellows and five hundred trainees, and represented Australia's third-largest group of medical specialists. This group dissociated itself from the College of Surgeons in that year, forming the Australian and New Zealand College of Anaesthetists. The College continues to train anaesthetists and maintain standards of practice in Australia and the region, while the Society continues as the member-based professional organisation for the specialty.

== Training with the Australia and New Zealand College of Anaesthetists ==
Completion of the Fellowship of the ANZCA requires:

- Completion of 5 years training in accredited training position in a hospital.
- Completion of the Primary Examination
- Completion of the Final Examination
- Completion of all specialised study units; including areas such as neuroanaesthesia, cardiac anaesthesia, paediatrics and obstetrics.

Most accredited hospitals are in Australia and New Zealand, and such hospitals are grouped into training rotations. Registrars move between two or more hospitals to complete the 5-year training period. The fifth and final year sees the trainee take on increasing responsibility and autonomy. Such final year trainees may be appointed to positions as "Provisional Fellows" if certain ANZCA requirements are met.

Those completing the above are eligible to become a Fellow of the ANZCA. Fellows of the Australian and New Zealand College of Anaesthetists are permitted to use the post nominals FANZCA.
