= Perioperative medicine =

Type of medical care

Perioperative medicine is the medical care of patients from the time of contemplation of surgery through the operative period to full recovery. Perioperative care may be provided by an anesthesiologist, intensivist, internal medicine generalist or hospitalist working with surgical colleagues.

== Background ==
Perioperative medicine encompasses the care of the patient preparing for, having and recuperating from surgery. In the practice of perioperative medicine the surgeon, anesthesiologist, intensivist and medical consultant work in concert. The medical knowledge distinct to this field includes that of operative risk and complications, of patient specific risks, of methods to reduce risk, and of the management of medical illness during this time period. Evidence supporting best practices in perioperative medicine is expanding, though historically this field has been directed by common practice and experience. It remains a field governed primarily by the art of medicine.

Notably, in the last decade, there has been a concerted effort by various anesthesia representative bodies to incorporate greater teaching into management of patients during the perioperative period. Specifically, annual summits have been held in the UK and US for a number of years, various courses exist to encourage this field of medicine and there is a PubMed listed journal dedicated to the field of Perioperative Medicine.

== See also ==
- Pre-anesthesia checkup
