= Anesthesiology =

Medical specialty concerned with anesthesia and perioperative care

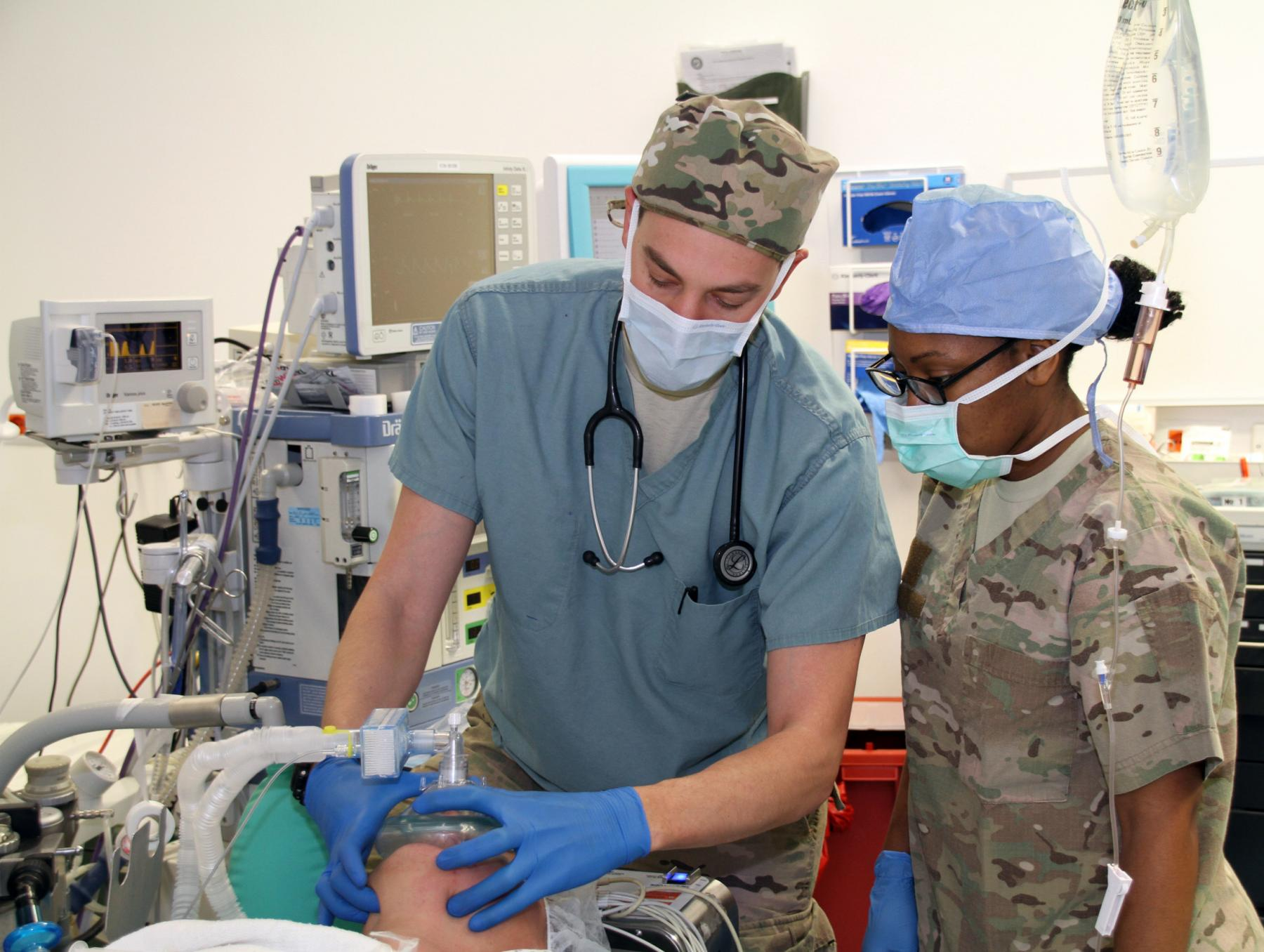
- An anesthesiologist controlling a patient's airway while inducing anesthesia
- Synonym: Anaesthesiology, anaesthesia, anaesthetics
- Focus: Anesthesia, perioperative medicine
- Subdivisions: Intensive care medicine Pain medicine Critical emergency medicine
- Specialist: Anesthesiologist; Anaesthesiologist; Anaesthetist

Anesthesiology
Occupation
- Occupation type: Specialty
- Activity sectors: Medicine

Description
- Education required: Doctor of Medicine (MD); Doctor of Osteopathic Medicine (DO); Bachelor of Medicine, Bachelor of Surgery (MBBS, MBCHB, et al.)
- Fields of employment: Hospitals, Clinics

Anesthesiology, anaesthesiology, or anaesthesia is the medical specialty concerned with the total perioperative care of patients before, during and after surgery. It encompasses anesthesia, intensive care medicine, critical emergency medicine, and pain medicine. A physician specialized in anesthesiology is called an anesthesiologist, anaesthesiologist, or anaesthetist, depending on the country. In some countries, the terms are synonymous, while in other countries, they refer to different positions and anesthetist is only used for non-physicians, such as nurse anesthetists.

The core element of the specialty is the prevention and mitigation of pain and distress using various anesthetic agents, as well as the monitoring and maintenance of a patient's vital functions throughout the perioperative period. Since the 19th century, anesthesiology has developed from an experimental area with non-specialist practitioners using novel, untested drugs and techniques into what is now a highly refined, safe and effective field of medicine. In some countries anesthesiologists comprise the largest single cohort of doctors in hospitals, and their role can extend far beyond the traditional role of anesthesia care in the operating room, including fields such as providing pre-hospital emergency medicine, running intensive care units, transporting critically ill patients between facilities, management of hospice and palliative care units, and prehabilitation programs to optimize patients for surgery.

== Scope ==
As a specialty, the core element of anesthesiology is the practice of anesthesia. This comprises the use of various injected and inhaled medications to produce a loss of sensation in patients, making it possible to carry out procedures that would otherwise cause intolerable pain or be technically unfeasible. Safe anesthesia requires in-depth knowledge of various invasive and non-invasive organ support techniques that are used to control patients' vital functions while under the effects of anaesthetic drugs; these include advanced airway management, invasive and non-invasive hemodynamic monitors, and diagnostic techniques like ultrasonography and echocardiography. Anesthesiologists are expected to have expert knowledge of human physiology, medical physics, and pharmacology as well as a broad general knowledge of all areas of medicine and surgery in all ages of patients, with a particular focus on those aspects which may impact on a surgical procedure. In recent decades, the role of anesthesiologists has broadened to focus not just on administering anesthetics during the surgical procedure itself, but also beforehand in order to identify high-risk patients and optimize their fitness, during the procedure to maintain situational awareness of the surgery itself so as to improve safety, and afterwards to promote and enhance recovery. This has been termed "perioperative medicine".

The concept of intensive care medicine arose in the 1950s and 1960s, with anesthesiologists taking organ support techniques that had traditionally been used only for short periods during surgical procedures (such as positive pressure ventilation) and applying these therapies to patients with organ failure, who might require vital function support for extended periods until the effects of the illness could be reversed. The first intensive care unit was opened by Bjørn Aage Ibsen in Copenhagen in 1953, prompted by a polio epidemic during which many patients required prolonged artificial ventilation. In many countries, intensive care medicine is considered to be a subspecialty of anesthesiology, and anesthesiologists often rotate between duties in the operating room and the intensive care unit. This allows continuity of care when patients are admitted to the ICU after their surgery, and it also means that anesthesiologists can maintain their expertise at invasive procedures and vital function support in the controlled setting of the operating room, while then applying those skills in the more dangerous setting of the critically ill patient. In other countries, intensive care medicine has evolved further to become a separate medical specialty in its own right, or has become a "supra-specialty" which may be practiced by doctors from various base specialties such as anesthesiology, emergency medicine, general medicine, surgery or neurology.

Anesthesiologists have key roles in major trauma, resuscitation, airway management, and caring for other patients outside the operating theatre who have critical emergencies that pose an immediate threat to life, again reflecting transferable skills from the operating room, and allowing continuity of care when patients are brought for surgery or intensive care. This branch of anesthesiology is collectively termed critical emergency medicine, and includes provision of pre-hospital emergency medicine as part of air ambulance or emergency medical services, as well as safe transfer of critically ill patients from one part of a hospital to another, or between healthcare facilities. Anesthesiologists commonly form part of cardiac arrest teams and rapid response teams composed of senior clinicians that are immediately summoned when a patient's heart stops beating, or when they deteriorate acutely while in hospital. Different models for emergency medicine exist internationally: in the Anglo-American model, the patient is rapidly transported by non-physician providers to definitive care such as an emergency department in a hospital. Conversely, the Franco-German approach has a physician, often an anesthesiologist, come to the patient and provide stabilizing care in the field. The patient is then triaged directly to the appropriate department of a hospital.

The role of anesthesiologists in ensuring adequate pain relief for patients in the immediate postoperative period as well as their expertise in regional anesthesia and nerve blocks has led to the development of pain medicine as a subspecialty in its own right. The field comprises individualized strategies for all forms of analgesia, including pain management during childbirth, neuromodulatory technological methods such as transcutaneous electrical nerve stimulation or implanted spinal cord stimulators, and specialized pharmacological regimens.

Anesthesiologists often perform interhospital transfers of critically ill patients, both on short range helicopter or ground based missions, as well as longer range national transports to specialized centra or international missions to retrieve citizens injured abroad. Ambulance services employ units staffed by anesthesiologists that can be called out to provide advanced airway management, blood transfusion, thoracotomy, ECMO, and ultrasound capabilities outside the hospital. Anesthesiologists often (along with general surgeons and orthopedic surgeons) make up part of military medical teams to provide anesthesia and intensive care to trauma victims during armed conflicts.

== Terminology ==
Various names and spellings are used to describe this specialty and the individuals who practice it in different parts of the world. In North America, the specialty is referred to as anesthesiology (omitting the "ae" diphthong), and a physician of that specialty is therefore called an anesthesiologist. In these countries, the term anesthestist is used to refer to non-physician providers of anesthesia services such as certified registered nurse anesthetists (CRNAs) and anesthesiologist assistants (AAs). In other countries – such as United Kingdom, Australia, New Zealand, and South Africa – the medical specialty is referred to as anaesthesia or anaesthetics, with the "ae" diphthong. Contrary to the terminology in North America, anaesthetist is used only to refer to a physician practicing in the field; non-physicians use other titles such as physician assistant. At this time, the spelling anaesthesiology is most commonly used in written English, and a physician practicing in the field is termed an anaesthesiologist. This is the spelling adopted by the World Federation of Societies of Anaesthesiologists and the European Society of Anaesthesiology, as well as the majority of their member societies. It is the also the most commonly used spelling found in the titles of medical journals. In fact, many countries, such as Ireland and Hong Kong, which formerly used anaesthesia and anaesthetist have now transitioned to anaesthesiology and anaesthesiologist.

== History ==
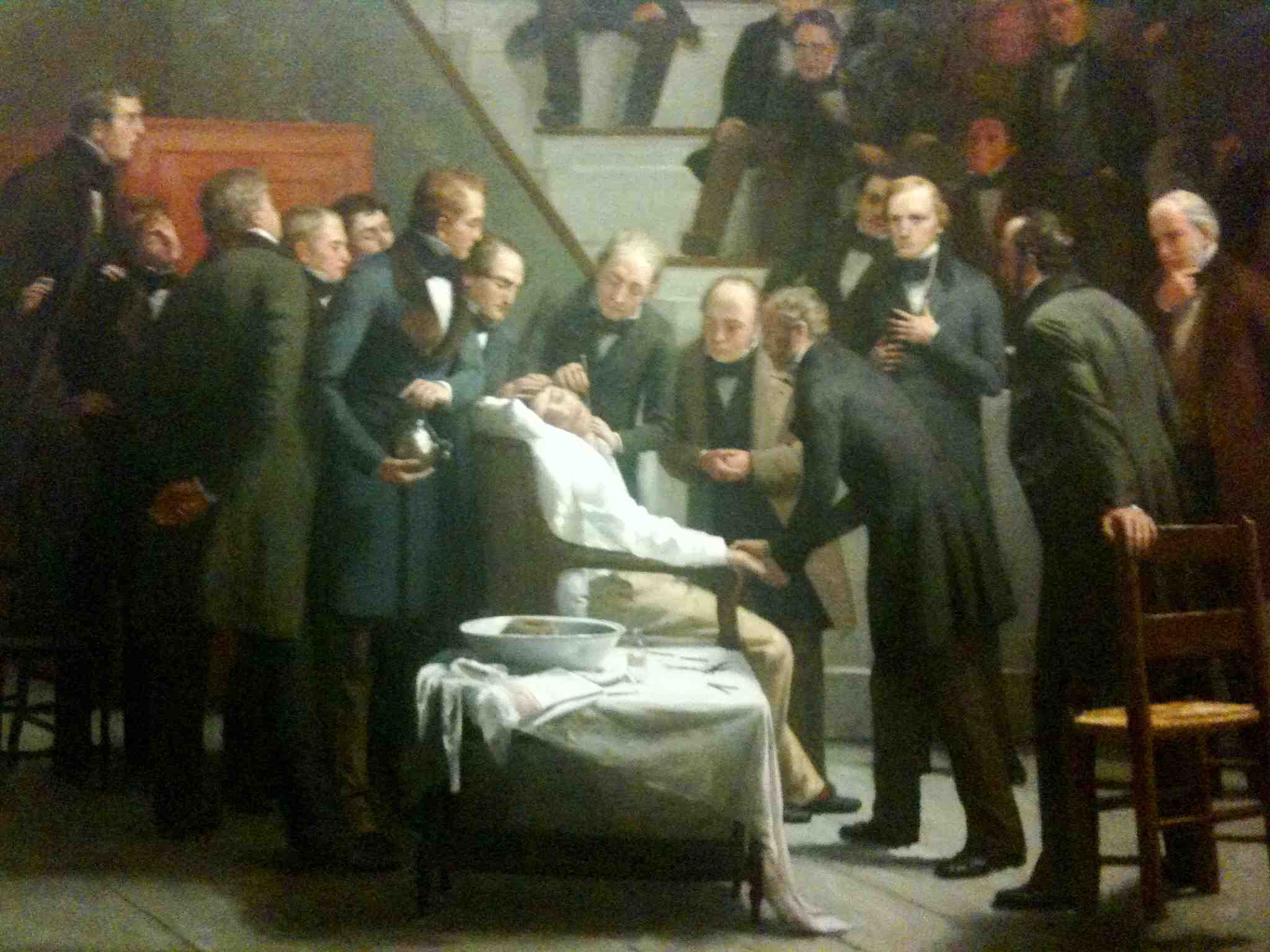
This painting by Robert C. Hinckley depicts the first successful public demonstration of using ether to induce anesthesia.

Throughout human history, efforts have been made by almost every civilization to mitigate pain associated with surgical procedures, ranging from techniques such as acupuncture or phlebotomy to administration of substances such as mandrake, opium, or alcohol. However, by the mid-nineteenth century the study and administration of anesthesia had become far more complex as physicians began experimenting with compounds such as chloroform and nitrous oxide, albeit with mixed results. On October 16, 1846, a day that would thereafter be referred to as "Ether Day", in the Bullfinch Auditorium at Massachusetts General Hospital, which would later be nicknamed the "Ether Dome", New England Dentist William Morton successfully demonstrated the use of diethyl ether using an inhaler of his own design to induce general anesthesia for a patient undergoing removal of a neck tumor. Reportedly, following the quick procedure, operating surgeon John Warren affirmed to the audience that had gathered to watch the exhibition, "Gentlemen, this is no humbug!", although this report has been disputed.

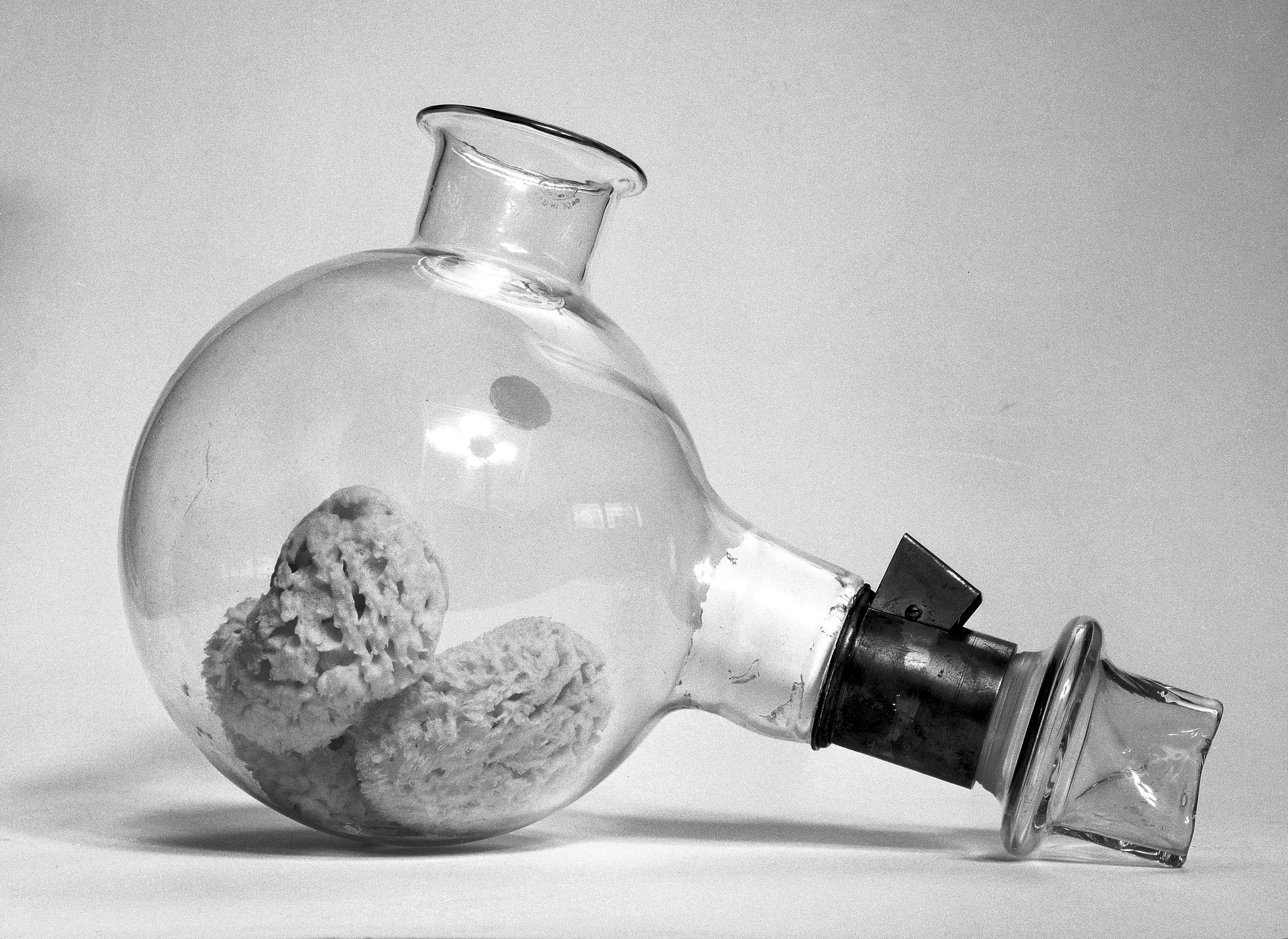
This is a recreation of the ether inhaler apparatus used by William Morton, a Boston-based dentist, on October 16, 1846, at Massachusetts General Hospital.

The term Anaesthesia was first used by the Greek philosopher Dioscorides, derived from the Ancient Greek roots ἀν- an-, "not", αἴσθησις aísthēsis, "sensation" to describe the insensibility that accompanied the narcotic-like effect produced by the mandrake plant. However, following Morton's successful exhibition, Oliver Wendell Holmes Sr. sent a letter to Morton in which he first suggested anesthesia to denote the medically induced state of amnesia, insensibility, and stupor that enabled physicians to operate with minimal pain or trauma to the patient. The original term had simply been "etherization" because at the time this was the only agent discovered that was capable of inducing such a state.

Over the next one hundred-plus years the specialty of anesthesiology developed rapidly as further scientific advancements meant that physicians' means of controlling peri-operative pain and monitoring patients' vital functions grew more sophisticated. With the isolation of cocaine in the mid-nineteenth century there began to be drugs available for local anesthesia. By the end of the nineteenth century, the number of pharmacological options had increased and had begun to be applied both peripherally and neuraxially. Then in the twentieth century neuromuscular blockade allowed the anesthesiologist to completely paralyze the patient pharmacologically and breathe for him or her via mechanical ventilation. With these new tools, the anesthetist could intensively manage the patient's physiology, bringing about critical care medicine, which, in many countries, is intimately connected to anesthesiology.

Historically anesthesia providers were almost solely utilized during surgery to administer general anesthesia in which a person is placed in a pharmacologic coma. This is performed to permit surgery without the individual responding to pain (analgesia) during surgery or remembering (amnesia) the surgery.

== Investigations ==
Effective practice of anesthesiology requires several areas of knowledge by the practitioner, some of which are:

- Pharmacology of commonly used drugs including inhalational anaesthetics, topical anesthetics, and vasopressors as well as numerous other drugs used in association with anesthetics (e.g., ondansetron, glycopyrrolate)
- Monitors: electrocardiography, electroencephalography, electromyography, entropy monitoring, neuromuscular monitoring, cortical stimulation mapping, and neuromorphology
- Mechanical ventilation
- Anatomical knowledge of the nervous system for nerve blocks, etc.
- Other areas of medicine (e.g., cardiology, pulmonology, obstetrics) to assess the risk of anesthesia to adequately have informed consent, and knowledge of anesthesia regarding how it affects certain age groups (neonates, pediatrics, geriatrics)

== Treatments ==
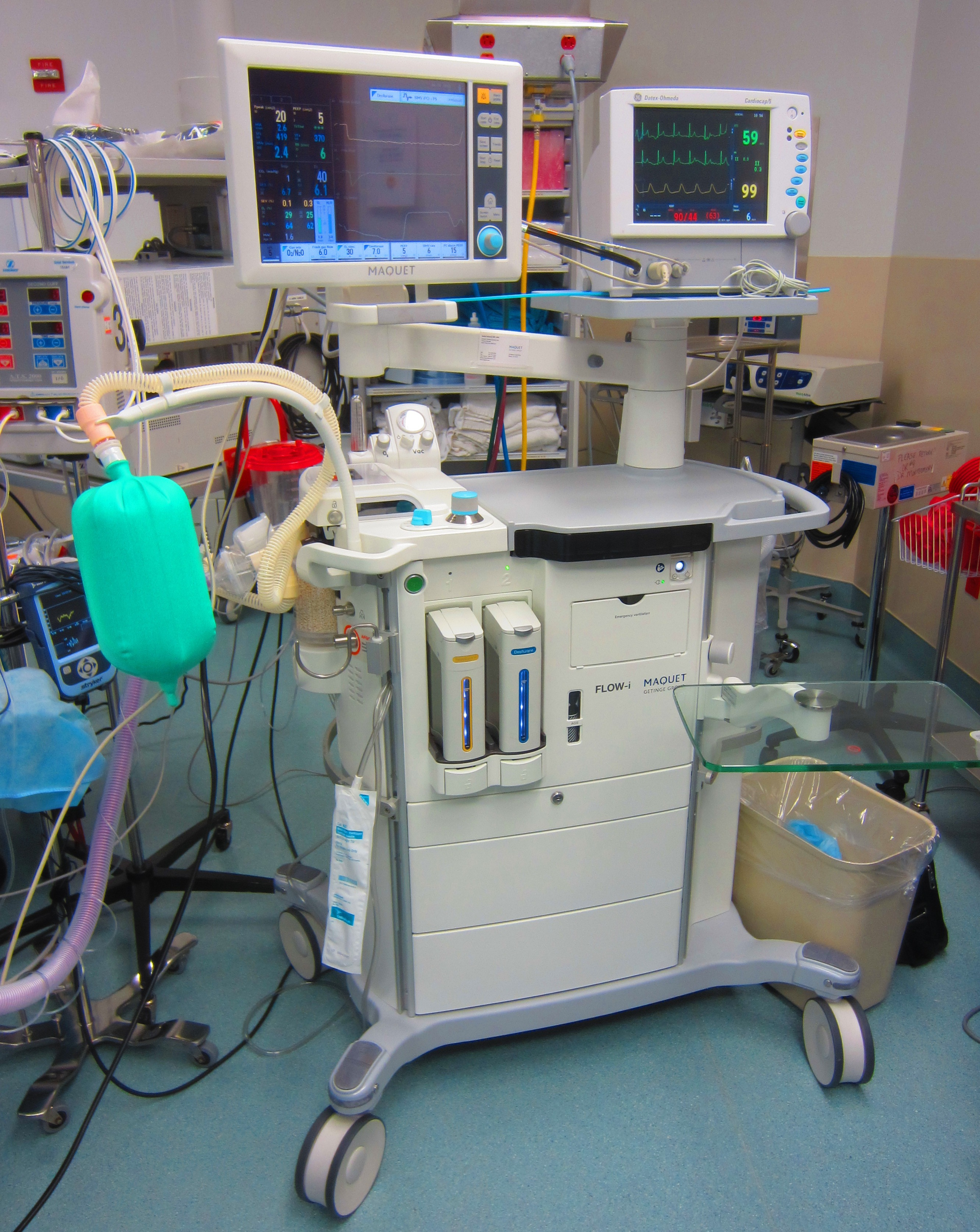
A typical anesthesia machine, which an anesthesiologist can use to store equipment, administer inhalational anesthetics, and properly ventilate an anesthetized patient

Many procedures or diagnostic tests do not require "general anesthesia" and can be performed using various forms of sedation or regional anesthesia, which can be performed to induce analgesia in a region of the body. For example, epidural administration of a local anesthetic is commonly performed on the mother during childbirth to reduce labor pain while permitting the mother to be awake and active in labor and delivery.

In the United States, anesthesiologists may also perform non-surgical pain management (termed pain medicine) and provide care for patients in intensive care units (termed critical care medicine).

== Training ==
International standards for the safe practice of anesthesia, jointly endorsed by the World Health Organization and the World Federation of Societies of Anaesthesiologists, define anesthesiologist as a graduate of a medical school who has completed a nationally recognized specialist anesthesia training program. The length and format of anesthesiology training programs varies from country to country, as noted below. A candidate must first have completed medical school training to be awarded a medical degree, before embarking on a program of postgraduate specialist training or residency which can range from four to nine years. Anesthesiologists in training spend this time gaining experience in various different subspecialties of anesthesiology and undertake various advanced postgraduate examinations and skill assessments. These lead to the award of a specialist qualification at the end of their training indicating that they are an expert in the field and may be licensed to practice independently.

=== Argentina ===
In Argentina, specialized training in the field of anesthesiology is overseen by the Argentine Federation of Associations of Anaesthesia, Analgesia and Reanimation (in Spanish, Federación Argentina de Asociaciones de Anestesia, Analgesia y Reanimación or FAAAAR). Residency programs are four to five years long.

=== Australia and New Zealand ===
In Australia and New Zealand, the medical specialty is referred to as anaesthesia or anaesthetics; note the extra "a" (or diphthong). Specialist training is supervised by the Australian and New Zealand College of Anaesthetists (ANZCA), while anaesthetists are represented by the Australian Society of Anaesthetists and the New Zealand Society of Anaesthetists. The ANZCA-approved training course encompasses an initial two-year long Pre-vocational Medical Education and Training (PMET), which may include up to 12 months training in anaesthesia or ICU medicine, plus at least five years of supervised clinical training at approved training sites. Trainees must pass both the primary and final examinations which consist of both written (multiple choice questions and short-answer questions) and, if successful in the written exams, oral examinations (viva voce).

In the final written examination, there are many questions of clinical scenarios (including interpretation of radiological exams, EKGs and other special investigations). There are also two cases of real patients with complex medical conditions – for clinical examination and a following discussion. The course has a program of 12 modules such as obstetric anaesthesia, pediatric anaesthesia, cardiothoracic and vascular anaesthesia, neurosurgical anaesthesia and pain management. Trainees also have to complete an advanced project, such as a research publication or paper. They also undergo an EMAC (Effective Management of Anaesthetic Crises) or EMST (Early Management of Severe Trauma) course. On completion of training, the trainees are awarded the Diploma of Fellowship and are entitled to use the qualification of FANZCA – Fellow of the Australian and New Zealand College of Anaesthetists.

=== Brazil ===
In Brazil, anesthesiology training is overseen by the National Commission for Medical Residency (CNRM) and the Brazilian Society of Anesthesiology (SBA). Approximately 650 physicians are admitted yearly to a three-year specialization program with a duty hour limit of 60 hours per week. The residency programs can take place at training centers in university hospitals. These training centers are accredited by the Brazilian Society of Anesthesiology (SBA), or other referral hospitals accredited by the Ministry of Health. Most of the residents are trained in different areas, including ICU, pain management, and anesthesiology sub-specialties, including transplants and pediatrics. Residents may elect to pursue further specialization via a fellowship post-residency, but this is optional and only offered at few training centers. In order to be a certified anesthesiologist in Brazil, the residents must undergo exams (conducted by the SBA) throughout the residency program and at the end of the program.

=== Canada ===
In Canada, training is supervised by 17 universities approved by the Royal College of Physicians and Surgeons of Canada. Residency programs are typically five years long, consisting of 1.5 years of general medicine training followed by 3.5 years of anesthesia specific training. Canada, like the United States, uses a competency-based curriculum along with an evaluation method called "Entrustable Professional Activities" or "EPA" in which a resident is assessed based on their ability to perform certain tasks that are specific to the field of anesthesiology. Upon completion of a residency program, the candidate is required to pass a comprehensive objective examination consisting of a written component (two three-hour papers: one featuring 'multiple choice' questions, and the other featuring 'short-answer' questions) and an oral component (a two-hour session relating to topics on the clinical aspects of anesthesiology). The examination of a patient is not required. Upon completion of training, the anaesthesia graduate is then entitled to become a "Fellow of the Royal College of Physicians of Canada" and to use the post-nominal letters "FRCPC".

=== Germany ===
In Germany, after earning the right to practice medicine (German: Approbation), German physicians who want to become anaesthesiologists must undergo five years of additional training as outlined by the German Society of Anaesthesiology and Intensive Care Medicine (Deutsche Gesellschaft für Anästhesiologie und Intensivmedizin, or DGAI). This specialist training consists of anaesthesiology, emergency medicine, intensive care and pain medicine, and also palliative care medicine. Similar to many other countries, the training includes rotations serving in the operation theatres to perform anaesthesia on a variety of patients being treated by various surgical subspecialties (e.g. general surgery, neurosurgery, invasive urological and gynecological procedures), followed by a rotation through various intensive-care units. Many German anaesthesiologists choose to complete an additional curriculum in emergency medicine, which once completed, enables them to be referred to as Notarzt, an emergency physician working pre-clinically with the emergency medical service. In pre-clinical settings the emergency physician is assisted by paramedics.

=== Netherlands ===
In the Netherlands, anaesthesiologists must complete medical school training, which takes six years. After successfully completing medical school training, they start a five-year residency training in anaesthesiology. The final two years of residency (the fourth and fifth years) are devoted to a differentiation track in either perioperative medicine, intensive care medicine, or pain and palliative medicine. Residents who choose the perioperative medicine track further specialize in an area such as general anaesthesiology, paediatric anaesthesiology, obstetric anaesthesiology, emergency medicine, or research.

=== Guatemala ===
In Guatemala, a student with a medical degree must complete a residency of 4 years. This consists of 3 years in residency and one year of supervised practice with an expert anaesthesiologist.

After residency, students take a board examination conducted by the college of medicine of Guatemala, the Universidad de San Carlos de Guatemala (Medicine Faculty Examination Board), and a chief physician who represents the health care ministry of the government of Guatemala. The examination includes a written section, an oral section, and a special examination of skills and knowledge relating to anaesthetic instruments, emergency treatment, pre-operative care, post-operative care, intensive care units, and pain medicine. After passing the examination, the college of medicine of Guatemala, Universidad de San Carlos de Guatemala and the health care ministry of the government of Guatemala grants the candidate a special license to practice anaesthesia as well as a diploma issued by the Universidad de San Carlos de Guatemala granting the degree of physician with specialization in anaesthesia. Anaesthetists in Guatemala are also subject to yearly examinations and mandatory participation in yearly seminars on the latest developments in anaesthetic practice.

=== Hong Kong ===
To be qualified as an anesthesiologist in Hong Kong, medical practitioners must undergo a minimum of six years of postgraduate training and pass three professional examinations. Upon completion of training, the Fellowship of Hong Kong College of Anesthesiologists and subsequently the Fellowship of Hong Kong Academy of Medicine is awarded. Practicing anesthesiologists are required to register in the Specialist register of the Medical Council of Hong Kong and hence are under the regulation of the Medical Council.

=== Italy ===
In Italy, a medical school graduate must complete an accredited five-year residency in anesthesiology. Anesthesia training is overseen by the Italian Society of Anaesthesia, Analgesia, Resuscitation, and Intensive Care (SIAARTI).

=== The Nordic countries ===
In Denmark, Finland, Iceland, Norway, and Sweden, anesthesiologists' training is supervised by the respective national societies of anesthesiology as well as the Scandinavian Society of Anaesthesiology and Intensive Care Medicine. In the Nordic countries, anesthesiology is the medical specialty that is engaged in the fields of anesthesia, intensive care medicine, pain control medicine, pre-hospital and in-hospital emergency medicine. Medical school graduates must complete a twelve-month internship, followed by a five-year residency program. SSAI currently hosts six training programs for anesthesiologists in the Nordics. These are Intensive care, Pediatric anesthesiology and intensive care, Advanced pain medicine, Critical care medicine, Critical emergency medicine, and Advanced obstetric anesthesiology.

==== Sweden ====
In Sweden one speciality entails both anesthesiology and intensive care, i.e. one cannot become and anesthetist without also becoming an intensivist and vice versa. The Swedish Board of Health and Welfare regulates specialization for medical doctors in the country and defines the speciality of anesthesiology and intensive care as being:

"[…] characterized by a cross-professional approach and entailing

- perioperative medicine,
- anesthesia and pain relief during diagnostic and therapeutic procedures,
- intensive care,
- urgent care of patients with serious diseases and injuries,
- prehospital care including transport and disaster medicine, and
- pain management."

A medical doctor can enter training as a resident in anesthesiology and intensive care after obtaining a license to practice medicine, following an 18–24 month internship. The residency program then lasts at least five years, not including the internship. See also Residency (medicine), Sweden.

=== United Kingdom ===
In the United Kingdom, training is supervised by the Royal College of Anaesthetists. Following the completion of medical school training (five to six years), doctors enter a two-year foundation program that consists of at least six four-month rotations in various medical specialties, including a minimum of three months each of general medicine and general surgery. Following the foundation program, physicians compete for a place on a specialist training programme, which currently runs for an indicative seven years, organised into three stages: Stage 1 (three years), Stage 2 (two years), and Stage 3 (two years).

Trainees must pass the Primary Fellowship of the Royal College of Anaesthetists (FRCA) examination during the earlier stages of training and the Final FRCA examination during the later stages before being eligible to complete training. Trainees wishing to hold dual accreditation in anaesthesia and intensive care medicine may enter anaesthesia training via the Acute Care Common Stem (ACCS) programme, a four-year pathway consisting of experience in anaesthesia, emergency medicine, acute medicine, and intensive care medicine. Trainees in anaesthesia are called Specialty Registrars (StR).

The curriculum follows a modular, outcome-based format, with trainees gaining experience in special areas such as cardiac anaesthesia, neuroanaesthesia, paediatric anaesthesia, pain medicine, intensive care, and obstetric anaesthesia. On completion of training, physicians are awarded a Certificate of Completion of Training (CCT), are eligible for entry onto the General Medical Council (GMC) Specialist Register, and are able to work as a consultant anaesthetist. Combining medical school, foundation training, and specialist training, a new consultant in anaesthetics will typically have completed approximately 14 years of training in total.

Those wishing for dual accreditation in intensive care medicine and anaesthesia are required to undergo approximately one additional year of training and to also complete the Fellowship of the Faculty of Intensive Care Medicine (FFICM). Pain medicine specialists sit the Fellowship of the Faculty of Pain Medicine of the Royal College of Anaesthetists (FFPMRCA) examination.

=== United States ===
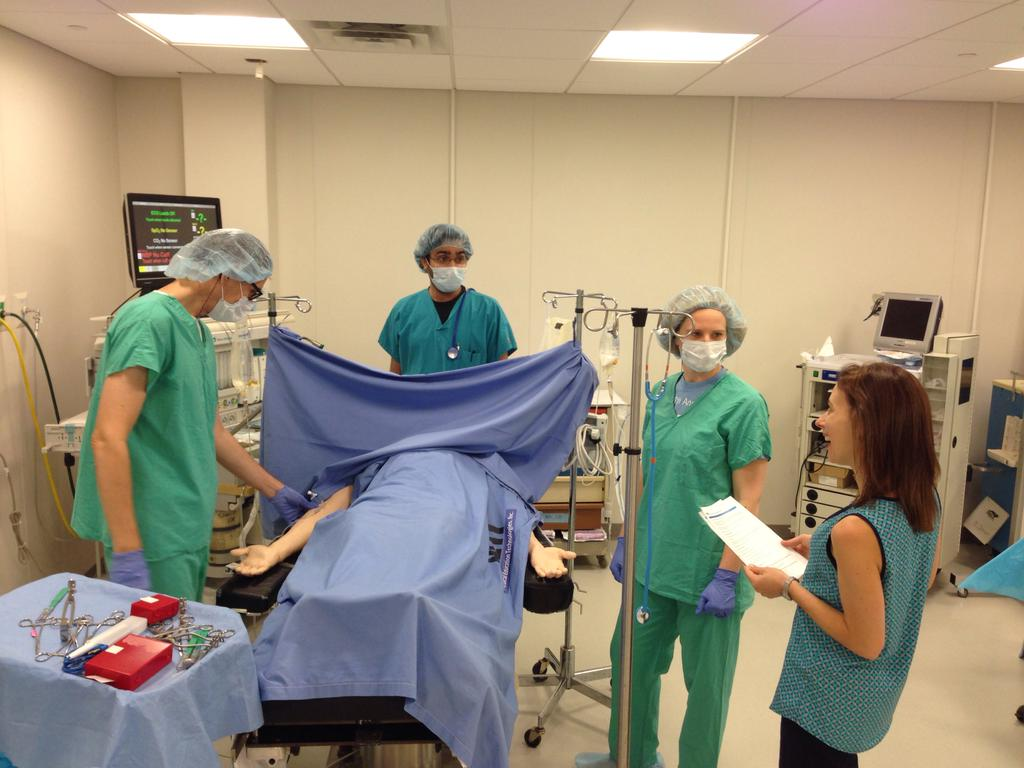
Photo of prebriefing for mixed modality simulation being used for anesthesia resident training

Following medical school training, anesthesiology residency programs in the United States require successful completion of an intern year plus three years of advanced residency training at an ACGME approved program (for a total of four years) for board certification eligibility in the specialty of anesthesiology. Anesthesiology residents face multiple examinations during their residency, including exams encompassing physiology, pathophysiology, pharmacology, and other medical sciences addressed in medical school, along with multiple anesthesia knowledge tests which assess progress during residency. Successful completion of both a written and oral board exam after completion of residency is required for board certification.

Residency training in the U.S. encompasses the full scope of perioperative medicine, including pre-operative medical evaluation, management of pre-existing disease in the surgical patient, intraoperative life support, intraoperative pain control, intraoperative ventilation, post-operative recovery, intensive care medicine, and chronic and acute pain management. After residency, many anesthesiologists complete an additional fellowship year of sub-specialty training in areas such as pain management, sleep medicine, cardiothoracic anesthesiology, pediatric anesthesiology, neuroanesthesiology, regional anesthesiology/ambulatory anesthesiology, obstetric anesthesiology, or critical care medicine.

The majority of anesthesiologists in the United States are board-certified, either by the American Board of Anesthesiology (ABA) or the American Osteopathic Board of Anesthesiology (AOBA). Osteopathic physician anesthesiologists can be certified by the ABA. The ABA is a member of the American Board of Medical Specialties, while the AOBA falls under the American Osteopathic Association. Both Boards are recognized by the major insurance underwriters in the U.S. as well as by all branches of the U.S. Uniformed Services. Board certification by the ABA involves both a written and an oral examination. AOBA certification requires the same exams, in addition to a practical examination with examining physicians observing the applicant actually administering anesthetics in the operating room.

There are several non-physician anesthesia providers practicing in the United States. These include certified registered nurse anesthetists (CRNAs), anesthesiologist assistants (AAs), and dental anesthesiologists. CRNAs are the only type of non-physician anesthesia provider that have successfully lobbied for the ability to provide all types of anesthesia for any surgery or procedure independently in some states. AAs must work under the supervision of an anesthesiologist, and dental anesthesiologists are limited to dental cases.
