= Deaths in July 2026 =

The following is a list of notable deaths in July 2026.

Entries for each day are listed alphabetically by surname. A typical entry lists information in the following sequence:

- Name, age, country of citizenship at birth, subsequent country of citizenship (if applicable), reason for notability, cause of death (if known), and reference.

== July 2026 ==
=== 1 ===
- Hans Aarsleff, 100, Danish linguist and academic.
- Antonio Antonini, 90, Argentine architect.
- Edna Arbel, 82, Israeli judge, justice of the supreme court (2004–2014).
- Mykola Avramenko, 74, Ukrainian weightlifting coach.
- Moritz Borman, 71, German-born American film producer (Terminator Salvation, World Trade Center, Snowden).
- Kenneth Cox, 97, American politician, member of the Ohio House of Representatives (1973–1976) and Senate (1977–1982).
- Christine Davy, 91, Australian Olympic alpine skier (1956, 1960).
- Michelle DuBarry, 94, Canadian drag queen.
- John Harrowfield, 73, Australian politician.
- Akiko Hayashi, 81, Japanese illustrator (Kiki's Delivery Service).
- LeRoy Irvin, 68, American football player (Los Angeles Rams, Detroit Lions), throat cancer.
- Toomas Kaldma, 82, Estonian football player (Norma Tallinn, Tallinna Dünamo), referee, and coach.
- Sergei Kulichenko, 48, Russian footballer (CSKA Moscow, Lantana Tallinn, Fakel Voronezh).
- Vasilis Leventis, 74, Greek politician, MP (2015–2019).
- Óscar Levín Coppel, 77, Mexican politician, three-term deputy and director of the national mint (2006–2009).
- Lilly Marcou, 89, French historian and researcher.
- Vladimir McTavish, 70, Scottish comedian.
- Joe Melson, 91, American singer and songwriter ("Only the Lonely", "Crying", "Blue Bayou").
- Stephen Pedley, 85, British Anglican prelate, bishop of Lancaster (1998–2005).
- Robert B. Pickering, 75, American anthropologist.
- Julio Revuelta, 67, Spanish politician, mayor of Logroño (2000–2007), cancer.
- John Ripard, 97, Maltese Olympic sailor (1960).
- André Romus, 89, Belgian painter and television director.
- Iossif Surchadzhiev, 81, Bulgarian actor (Wrathful Journey, Where Are You Going?, The Tree of Life).
- Anthony M. Trozzolo, 96, American chemist.
- Roger Vangheluwe, 89, Belgian Roman Catholic defrocked prelate, bishop of Bruges (1985–2010).
- Wayne Worcester, 78, American journalist.
- Yasmin, 90, Indian-born Pakistani actress (Kismet).

=== 2 ===
- Nihal Sri Ameresekere, 78, Sri Lankan litigation consultant.
- Atia Islam Anne, 64, Bangladeshi painter, cancer.
- Graham Bradley, 65, British National Hunt jockey, semantic dementia.
- Walter L. Cutler, 94, American diplomat, ambassador to Saudi Arabia (1984–1987, 1988–1989), Tunisia (1982–1984) and Congo-Zaire (1975–1979).
- Marie-Madeleine Dieulangard, 89, French politician, deputy (1988–1991), senator (1992–2001).
- Paul Dobson, 63, English footballer (Hartlepool United, Torquay United, Scarborough).
- Juan Frausto Pallares, 84, Mexican Roman Catholic prelate, auxiliary bishop of León (2005–2016).
- Barry Freeman, 78, New Zealand cricketer.
- Susana Freyre, 96, Argentine actress (Leonora of the Seven Seas, Three Loves in Rio, Paula cautiva).
- Danuta Grabowska, 83, Polish politician, MP (1989–1991, 1993–2005).
- Walther Graetsch, 73, German politician, member of the Landtag of Lower Saxony (1984–1990).
- Bertrand Grébaut, 44, French restaurateur, cancer.
- Tommy Hunter, 89, Canadian country singer ("Mary in the Morning").
- Hikaru Kurosaki, 64, Japanese actor and stunt performer (Shadow Warriors, MegaBeast Investigator Juspion).
- Lam Wing-kee, 70, Hong Kong bookseller and political activist, founder of Causeway Bay Books, lung cancer.
- Christian Lambert, 80, French civil servant, prefect of Seine-Saint-Denis (2010–2013).
- T. J. Lanning, 41, American alpine skier.
- Giacomo Lanzetti, 84, Italian Roman Catholic prelate, auxiliary bishop of Turin (2002–2006), bishop of Alghero-Bosa (2006–2010) and Alba Pompeia (2010–2015).
- Keith Mitchell, 51, American football player (New Orleans Saints, Houston Texans, Jacksonville Jaguars).
- Kjell Nilsson, 76, Swedish weightlifter and actor (Mad Max 2, The Pirate Movie, Man of Letters), kidney disease.
- Miroslav Pribanić, 80, Croatian handball player, Olympic champion (1972).
- Goran Rakočević, 75, Serbian basketball player (Crvena zvezda).
- Russell Sanderson, Baron Sanderson of Bowden, 93, Scottish politician and life peer, member of the House of Lords (1985–2018).
- Tibor Szilágyi, 83, Hungarian actor (Cats' Play).
- Jean-Pierre Tagliaferri, 77, French actor.
- Margus Tammekivi, 70, Estonian politician, MP (2007).
- Jim Walden, 88, American college football coach (Washington State Cougars, Iowa State Cyclones), respiratory failure.

=== 3 ===
- Alan Banks, 87, English footballer (Liverpool, Exeter City, Plymouth Argyle).
- Sepp Biebl, 89, German Olympic speed skater (1960).
- Gail Clark, 75, American football player (Chicago Bears, New England Patriots).
- Kelvin Coe, 82, New Zealand politician, mayor of Selwyn (2007–2016).
- Carter DeHaven, 94, American film producer (Hoosiers, Dead Heat on a Merry-Go-Round, The Exorcist III).
- Erling Diesen, 93, Norwegian engineer and civil servant, director of the Norwegian Water Resources and Energy Directorate (1987–1999).
- Rainer Dörrzapf, 76, German Olympic weightlifter (1968, 1972).
- Manouchehr Farid, 88, Iranian-Australian actor (Downpour, Ballad of Tara, Brick and Mirror).
- Trevor Fishlock, 85, British journalist (The Times, The Daily Telegraph).
- Peter Higham, 95, English footballer (Wigan Athletic, Nottingham Forest, Buxton).
- Weiron Holmberg, 91, Swedish actor (Sällskapsresan, Repmånad, Göta kanal eller Vem drog ur proppen?).
- Sir George Howarth, 77, British politician, MP (1986–2024).
- Torunn Isberg, 76, Norwegian Olympic artistic gymnast (1968).
- Fernando Kliche, 71, Uruguayan actor (El amor está de moda, No abras la puerta, Amor a la Catalán), pancreatic cancer.
- Bruno Lucchesi, 99, Italian-American sculptor.
- Lydia Maximus, 87, Belgian politician, senator (1990–1999), member of the Flemish Parliament (1990–1999).
- Mihail Mocan, 63, Moldovan politician, deputy (2005–2014).
- Lydia Möcklinghoff, 45, German ecologist and zoologist, plane crash.
- Motivator, 24, British Thoroughbred racehorse and sire, heart attack.
- Martin Naughton, 87, Irish electrical goods manufacturer, founder of GlenDimplex.
- Yukiko Nikaido, 87, Japanese actress and voice actress (Lupin the 3rd Part I, Song of Baseball Enthusiasts).
- Zrinko Ogresta, 67, Croatian film director (Fragments: Chronicle of a Vanishing, Washed Out, Behind the Glass) and screenwriter.
- John Parisella, 81, American horse trainer.
- Shahrnush Parsipur, 80, Iranian writer and translator.
- Alfons Pawelczyk, 93, German politician, MP (1969–1980).
- Bobbi Queen, 84, American fashion editor (Women's Wear Daily), heart attack.
- Georges Senecot, 85, French Olympic diver.
- Robert B. Sloan, 77, American academic and theologian, president of Houston Christian University (since 2006), complications from a stroke.
- József Tóth, 93, Hungarian hydrogeologist and academic.
- Jim Tracy, 69, American politician, member (2005–2017) and president pro tempore (2017) of the Tennessee Senate.

=== 4 ===
- Leonard Abramson, 93, American managed care founder and executive (U.S. Healthcare).
- Bill Archer, 98, American politician, member of the U.S. House of Representatives (1971–2001) and the Texas House of Representatives (1967–1971).
- Waldemar Borges, 67, Brazilian politician, Pernambuco MLA (since 2011), cancer.
- Adriano Caprioli, 90, Italian Roman Catholic prelate, bishop of Reggio Emilia–Guastalla (1998–2012).
- Frank Cohn, 100, German-born American colonel.
- Moritz de Hadeln, 85, Swiss film director and film festival organizer.
- Michel El Khoury, 99, Lebanese politician, minister of national defense (1965–1966), governor of Banque du Liban (1978–1983, 1991–1993).
- Robbie Francevic, 84, New Zealand racing driver.
- Fouzia Habib, Pakistani politician, MNA (2008–2013). (death announced on this date)
- Al Holland, 73, American baseball player (San Francisco Giants, Philadelphia Phillies, New York Yankees).
- Slaine Kelly, 43, Irish actress (The Tudors, Comedown, Psychosis), cancer.
- Ed King, 89, American minister and civil rights activist.
- Shirley Kitchen, 79, American politician, member of the Pennsylvania House of Representatives (1987–1988) and Senate (1996–2006).
- Ntuthuko Mahlaba, 44, South African politician, member of the KwaZulu-Natal Legislature (since 2022), traffic collision.
- Grzegorz Miętus, 33, Polish ski jumper.
- David Emil Mungello, 82, American historian.
- Brian Paisley, 79, Canadian film and theatre producer, founder of the Edmonton International Fringe Festival.
- Koço Qendro, 99, Albanian actor (Within Love).
- Mohansinh Chhotubhai Rathava, 82, Indian politician, Gujarat MLA (1972–2002, since 2007).
- Tejbhan Singh, 83, Indian politician, Uttar Pradesh MLA (1977–1980, 1991–2002).
- Albert Sous, 91, German sculptor.
- Sparky D, 61, American rapper (Roxanne Wars).
- Hugo Van Rompaey, 83, Belgian politician, Flemish deputy (1981–1991, 1995–1999), senator (1991–1995).
- Lothar Voigtländer, 82, German composer.
- Bogusław Zmudziński, 75, Polish academic and film critic.
- Rya W. Zobel, 94, German-American jurist, judge of the U.S. District Court of Massachusetts (since 1979).

=== 5 ===
- Ahmed Amar, 75, Algerian footballer (USM Bel Abbès, national team).
- Teejan Bai, 70, Indian Pandavani singer.
- Bayern, 15, American Thoroughbred racehorse, complications from hernia surgery.
- George Benedek, 97, American physicist.
- Marjan Berk, 93, Dutch writer and actress.
- Boris Chudetsky, 78, Russian politician, deputy (1990–1993).
- Giovanni Fanello, 87, Italian footballer (Catanzaro, Reggiana, 1960 Olympics).
- Renata Ford, 55, Canadian political candidate.
- Johnny Ginger, 92, American television presenter.
- Abul Kashem Fazlul Haq, 85, Bangladeshi writer and academic, president of the Bangla Academy (since 2024).
- Dick Himes, 80, American football player (Green Bay Packers), complications from Parkinson's disease.
- Darrell Jackson, 70, American baseball player (Minnesota Twins), lung cancer.
- Bert de Jong, 80, Dutch politician, member of the Senate (1999–2000).
- David C. Jordan, 91, American diplomat.
- Luis Margani, 77, Argentine actor (Crane World, Una noche con Sabrina Love, Loco Fever).
- Linda McCarriston, 82, American poet.
- Taiichirō Nishikawa, 84, Japanese politician, MP (1993–2003).
- Novoa, 82, Spanish football player (Sporting Gijón, Celta) and manager (Espanyol).
- Walt Odets, 79, American psychologist and author.
- Jiří Pták, 80, Czech rower, six-time Olympic competitor (1968–1980, 1988, 1992).
- Anthony Robbins, 85, American public health administrator.
- Piatro Sadoŭski, 85, Belarusian diplomat and politician, MP (1990–2009).
- Adolf Seger, 81, German wrestler, Olympic bronze medalist (1972, 1976).
- Andre Omer Siregar, 52, Indonesian diplomat.
- Toomas Turb, 69, Estonian middle and long-distance runner.
- Mike Wallace, 83, American historian and author (Greater Gotham), complications from Lewy body dementia.
- Rahel Yohannes, 79, Ethiopian singer and musician.

=== 6 ===
- Carmelo Cedrún, 95, Spanish football player (Athletic Bilbao, national team) and manager (Celta Vigo).
- Herman Chernoff, 103, American mathematician.
- Kevin Chown, 56, American bass guitarist (Chad Smith's Bombastic Meatbats, Artension, Tarja Turunen), bladder cancer.
- Luísa Cunha, 77, Portuguese painter, cancer.
- Nathan Fitzgerald, 27, Australian footballer (Epping), head injury.
- John Van Antwerp Fine Jr., 86, American historian.
- Nitzan Gilady, 56, Israeli film director (In Satmar Custody, Jerusalem Is Proud to Present, Wedding Doll).
- Bertram Jäger, 96, Austrian politician, member of the Landtag of Vorarlberg (1964–1994).
- George E. Johnson, 99, American hair and cosmetics executive, founder of the Johnson Products Company.
- Louise Lasser, 87, American actress (Mary Hartman, Mary Hartman, Bananas, Happiness).
- Alberto Lettieri, 67, Argentine historian and academic, complications from diabetes.
- Megas, 81, Icelandic singer.
- Sonny Morea, 94, American aerospace engineer and project manager (F-1, J-2, Lunar Roving Vehicle).
- Iivo Nei, 94, Estonian chess grandmaster.
- Vladimir Okrepilov, 82, Russian economist and academic.
- Ivan Petch, 87, Australian politician, New South Wales MLA (1988–1995).
- Chico Simões, 75, Brazilian politician, Minas Gerais MLA (2003–2005).
- Frida Vogels, 96, Dutch writer.

=== 7 ===
- François About, 86, French film director and photographer.
- Dirk Baert, 77, Belgian Olympic road and track cyclist (1968), world champion individual pursuit (1971).
- Tadeusz Baranowski, 81, Polish painter and comic book artist.
- Benedito Ruy Barbosa, 95, Brazilian telenovela writer (Pantanal, O Rei do Gado, Terra Nostra), chronic kidney disease.
- Rhett Bernstein, 38, American soccer player (Sevilla FC Puerto Rico, Mjøndalen IF, Miami FC).
- Girish Bharadwaj, 76, Indian social worker.
- Mikalay Charhinets, 88, Belarusian politician, member of the Council of the Republic (1997–2008).
- Fernando Chumaceiro, 94, Venezuelan politician, deputy (1969–1970).
- Beniamino Di Giacomo, 90, Italian footballer (Napoli, Inter Milan, national team).
- Bill Dow, 92, Scottish cricketer (Essex, national team).
- Paul Farrow, 61, American politician, member of the Wisconsin State Senate (2012–2015) and Assembly (2010–2012), mucinous adenocarcinoma.
- Béla Kádár, 92, Hungarian economist and politician, MP (1994–1998).
- Musharrof Husain Khan, 92, Bangladeshi academic.
- James Mackay, Baron Mackay of Clashfern, 99, British jurist and politician, Lord Chancellor (1987–1997) and member of the House of Lords (1979–2022).
- Benjamín Medrano Quezada, 59, Mexican politician, municipal president of Fresnillo (2013–2015), shot.
- Jamil Merrell, 36, American football player (Rutgers Scarlet Knights, Chicago Bears, Los Angeles KISS).
- Marc Messier, 78, Canadian actor (Looking for Eternity, Jesus of Montreal, The Wind from Wyoming) and writer.
- Jindřich Mikulec, 98, Czech Olympic gymnast (1952).
- Hans-Werner Müller, 83, German politician, MP (1976–1994), MEP (1977–1979).
- Sharon Dede Padi, 50, Ghanaian painter and poet.
- Joanna Pettet, 83, English actress (Casino Royale, The Night of the Generals, The Evil).
- Tony Rayns, 77, British writer and film commentator, fall.
- Kommidi Narasimha Reddy, 82, Indian politician, Andhra Pradesh MLA (1978–1985).
- Frank Ribaudo, 81, American businessman, founder of Club Café, glioblastoma.
- Alan Sader, 85, American actor (Evan Almighty, Lincoln, The Prince of Tides).
- Lorenzo Salgado Araujo, 52, Mexican construction business owner, shot.
- Larry Selders, 44, American politician, member of the Louisiana Senate (since 2025) and House of Representatives (2021–2025), heart aneurysm.
- Siti Chamamah Soeratno, 85, Indonesian academician.
- Tom Sweenie, 80, Scottish footballer (Leicester City, York City).
- William Taylor, 69, English Anglican priest, dean of Portsmouth Cathedral (2000–2002).
- Max Turner, 79, Australian politician.
- William D. Zabel, 89, American lawyer, complications from Parkinson's disease.
- Shapoor Zadran, 38, Afghan cricketer (Badureliya, Khulna Royal Bengals, national team), hemophagocytic lymphohistiocytosis.

=== 8 ===
- Ben Arredondo, 79, American politician, member of the Arizona House of Representatives (2011–2012).
- Asger Baunsbak-Jensen, 94, Danish politician, MP (1984).
- Ron Beattie, 72, Australian footballer (Hawthorn).
- Dino Bruni, 94, Italian road racing cyclist, Olympic silver medalist (1952).
- Theo Burrell, 39, British antiques expert (Antiques Roadshow), glioblastoma.
- Jesper Bøje Christensen, 81, Danish harpsichordist and music researcher.
- Rodney Franklin, 67, American jazz pianist and composer ("The Groove").
- Wally Funk, 87, American aviator and commercial astronaut.
- Dieter Gerhardt, 90, South African naval officer and spy.
- Reli German, 86, Filipino activist and public relations specialist.
- Greg Hawthorne, 69, American football player (Pittsburgh Steelers, New England Patriots, Indianapolis Colts), Super Bowl champion (1980).
- Harris Katleman, 97, American television producer (Salvage 1, The Don Rickles Show, From Here to Eternity).
- Oleksandr Kolesnikov, 76, Ukrainian politician, governor of Poltava Oblast (1998–1999).
- Ella Laboriel, 81, Mexican singer and actress.
- Jack Latvala, 74, American politician, member of the Florida Senate (1994–2002, 2010–2018).
- Malcolm Menin, 93, English Anglican prelate, bishop of Knaresborough (1986–1997).
- Dame Deirdre Milne, 87, New Zealand barrister.
- José Luis Monge Recalde, 91–92, Spanish politician, senator (1977–1982), member of the Parliament of Navarre (1983–1987).
- Gabriel Mureșan, 44, Romanian footballer (CFR Cluj, ASA Târgu Mureș, national team) and politician, mayor of Apold (since 2020), drowned.
- Ole Tom Nord, 85, Norwegian Olympic ski jumper (1960).
- Henry O. Pollak, 98, Austrian-American mathematician (Graham–Pollak theorem, Gilbert–Pollak conjecture).
- Phil Regan, 89, American baseball player (Los Angeles Dodgers, Chicago Cubs) and manager (Baltimore Orioles).
- Paola Revenioti, 68, Greek LGBTQ activist, cancer.
- John Ruf, 58, American sailor, Paralympic bronze medalist (2008).
- Andrée Touré, 91, Guinean first lady (1958–1984).
- Bonnie Tyler, 75, Welsh singer ("Holding Out for a Hero", "Total Eclipse of the Heart", "It's a Heartache"), complications from intestinal surgery.
- Leo van Veen, 80, Dutch football player (FC Utrecht, Ajax, Los Angeles Aztecs) and manager, complications from Alzheimer's disease.
- Ann Widdecombe, 78, British politician, MP (1987–2010), MEP (2019–2020), and minister of state for prisons (1995–1997), blunt force injury.
- Joseph Jules Zerey, 85, Egyptian Melkite Catholic hierarch, protosyncellus of Egypt and Sudan (2001–2008) and Jerusalem (2008–2018).
- Ihor Zvarych, 73, Ukrainian politician, deputy (2006–2007, 2011–2012).

=== 9 ===
- Augustine Obiora Akubeze, 69, Nigerian Roman Catholic prelate, archbishop of Benin City (since 2011).
- José Bada Panillo, 97, Spanish politician, minister of culture and education of Aragon (1983–1987).
- Gil Blanco, 80, American baseball player (New York Yankees, Kansas City Athletics).
- Nam-nguen Boonnak, 86, Thai actress (Bad Romeo).
- Robert E. Cohen, 79, American chemical engineer, complications from Parkinson's disease.
- Reynold D'Souza, 88, Kenyan Olympic field hockey player.
- Max Eiselin, 94, Swiss expedition leader, led first ascent of Dhaulagiri.
- Clara Ester, 78, American United Methodist minister and civil rights activist (Assassination of Martin Luther King Jr.), stroke.
- Rudolf Friedrich, 90, German politician, member of the Landtag of Hesse (1974–2003).
- Kimitaka Fujino, 78, Japanese politician, member of the House of Councillors (2003–2007).
- Eddie Goldenberg, 77, Canadian lawyer and writer, cancer.
- Patricia Greene, 95, English actress (The Archers, Crossroads, The Kitchen).
- Claude Halmos, 80, French psychoanalyst and essayist.
- Renaud Hardy, 64, Belgian convicted serial killer, heart failure.
- Calvin Hayes, 63, British musician (Johnny Hates Jazz).
- Don Iwerks, 96, American entertainment executive (Disney, SimEx-Iwerks).
- Yuri Karlikanov, 74, Russian politician, Chelyabinsk Oblast MLA (2005–2025).
- Jean-Louis Lechat, 83, Belgian journalist and comic book writer.
- Pepe León, 90, Spanish sporting executive, three-time president of Real Betis.
- Lee Yeon-suk, 90, South Korean politician, MP (2000–2004).
- Barbara Ling, 73, American production designer (Once Upon a Time in Hollywood, Michael, Batman Forever), Oscar winner (2020), cancer.
- Randolph Mantooth, 80, American actor (Emergency!, Loving, The City), complications from pneumonia.
- Takao Mikami, 92, Japanese politician, member of the House of Councillors (1989–1995).
- Kathy Muehlemann, 76, American painter, pancreatic cancer.
- Bruce Mwape, 66, Zambian football manager (women's national team).
- Rafael Antonio Niño, 76, Colombian road racing cyclist.
- Olev Raju, 78, Estonian politician, MP (1995–2003).
- Assaf Razin, 85, Israeli economist, academic and author.
- Lillian Roberts, 98, American union leader.
- Mark Alan Siegel, 82, American politician.
- Karol Stopa, 78, Polish sports commentator.
- Peter Van Norden, 75, American actor (The Naked Gun 2½: The Smell of Fear, The Accused, The Stand).

=== 10 ===
- Aleksandr Panayotov Aleksandrov, 74, Bulgarian cosmonaut (Mir EP-2).
- Michael Aspinall, 86, British opera singer and musicologist.
- Jordi Borja Sebastià, 85, Spanish politician, member of the Parliament of Catalonia (1980–1984).
- Cid Saboia de Carvalho, 90, Brazilian politician, senator (1987–1995).
- Chezhiyan, 57, Indian cinematographer (Kalloori, Paradesi, To Let).
- Chua Mia Tee, 94, Chinese-born Singaporean painter, pneumonia.
- Roland Collombin, 75, Swiss Olympic alpine skier (1972), throat and liver cancer.
- Carlos del Coso, 93, Spanish field hockey player, Olympic bronze medalist (1960).
- Jean-François Coste, 75, French sailor.
- Rachmad Gobel, 63, Indonesian politician, minister of trade (2014–2015).
- Mariazelle Goonetilleke, 68, Sri Lankan singer and musician.
- Josh Grisetti, 44, American actor (It Shoulda Been You, Camelot, The Marvelous Mrs. Maisel), suicide.
- Ralph Hemecker, 65, American television director (Blue Bloods, Once Upon a Time, The Flash).
- Derryn Hinch, 82, New Zealand-born Australian media personality (Hinch Live) and politician, senator (2016–2019).
- Đorđe Kadijević, 93, Serbian film director (Vuk Karadžić, The Gifts of My Cousin Maria, Leptirica), screenwriter and art critic.
- Dave Kendall, 68, British television personality (120 Minutes), disc jockey (SiriusXM), and journalist.
- Sharaf Uddin Khashru, Bangladeshi politician, MP (1991–1996).
- Enrique Krauss, 94, Chilean politician, twice deputy, minister of economy (1968–1969) and the interior (1990–1994).
- Mike Larnach, 73, Scottish footballer (Clydebank, Motherwell, Ayr United).
- Albert Mamy, 86, French politician, mayor of Sorèze (1977–2020), deputy (1986–1988).
- Kinu Rochford, 35, American basketball player (Cheshire Phoenix, Plymouth Raiders, Þór Þorlákshöfn), shot.
- Eva Røine, 97, Norwegian psychologist and actress (Trine!).
- Doug Stahl, 63, American professional wrestler.
- Ahmet Telli, 79, Turkish poet.
- Peter von Möllendorff, 63, German classical philologist.
- Wai Ching Ho, 82, Hong Kong actress (Daredevil, Iron Fist, Turning Red), complications from a stroke.
- Mark B. Wise, 72, Canadian-American theoretical physicist.

=== 11 ===
- Jayden Adams, 25, South African footballer (Stellenbosch, Mamelodi Sundowns, national team).
- Domenico Adinolfi, 80, Italian boxer and actor.
- Paul Atkins, 57, Australian footballer (Sydney Swans), traffic collision.
- Ken Bates, 94, British football executive and hotelier, chairman of Chelsea (1982–2003) and Leeds United (2005–2012).
- Peppino di Capri, 86, Italian singer-songwriter ("Un grande amore e niente più", "Champagne") and pianist.
- Tony Christopher, Baron Christopher, 101, British trade unionist and life peer, member of the House of Lords (1998–2026).
- Robert W. Cole, 95, American conductor, complications from a stroke.
- Albert Derolez, 91, Belgian librarian and medievalist.
- Yahiya Emerick, 55, American author and scholar.
- Leon Fuller, 87, American football coach (Texas Longhorns, Colorado State Rams).
- Lindsey Graham, 71, American politician, member of the U.S. Senate (since 2003) and House of Representatives (1995–2003), aortic dissection complicated by arteriosclerotic cardiovascular disease.
- Hans Ewald Hansen, 82, Danish footballer (B.1901, national team).
- Dave Hensman, 63, Canadian Christian singer-songwriter and priest.
- Jun Isezaki, 90, Japanese potter and ceramicist.
- S. Janaki, 88, Indian playback singer (16 Vayathinile, Oppol, Sitaara).
- Herbert E. Kaufman, 94, American ophthalmologist.
- Lenzman, 47, Dutch drum and bass producer, kidney cancer.
- Karl Lovell, 48, New Zealand rugby league player (Parramatta Eels, Sheffield Eagles, Huddersfield-Sheffield Giants), lung cancer.
- Edward Lucie-Smith, 93, Jamaican-born English writer, poet and art critic (Censoring the Body, British Poetry since 1945).
- Serge Malenfant, 67–68, Canadian painter and muralist.
- Manú, 43, Portuguese footballer (Marítimo, Legia Warsaw, Alverca), traffic collision.
- Dermot Murnaghan, 68, English television presenter (Eggheads) and news reporter (Sky News, BBC News), prostate cancer.
- Jean-Paul Pigasse, 86, French journalist, director-general of ADIAC (since 1997).
- Antonio Rattín, 89, Argentine footballer (Boca Juniors, national team).
- Valery Serov, 86, Russian politician, chairman of the State Committee for Construction (1989–1991).
- Gunter Stein, 84, American electrical engineer.
- Susumu Tonegawa, 86, Japanese biologist (V(D)J recombination), Nobel Prize laureate (1987).
- Héctor Valle, 85, Puerto Rican baseball player (Los Angeles Dodgers).
- Sombun Wanchaithanawong, 89, Thai politician, MP (1988–2011).

=== 12 ===
- Scott Bryce, 68, American actor (As the World Turns, Visions of Murder, Murphy Brown), esophageal and stomach cancer.
- Kent Carpenter, 73, American marine biologist, shot.
- Gariba II, 87, Ghanaian traditional ruler.
- Luis Goytisolo, 91, Spanish novelist, member of the Royal Spanish Academy.
- John Hamm, 88, Canadian politician, premier of Nova Scotia (1999–2006).
- H. Hanumanthappa, 94, Indian politician, MP (1982–2000).
- Josef Kompalla, 90, Polish-German ice hockey player (Gwardia Katowice, GKS Katowice) and three-time Olympic referee (1976–1984).
- Günter Kuntz, 87, German footballer (VfR Kaiserslautern, Borussia Neunkirchen, Austria Wien).
- Gilda Love, 100, Spanish drag queen.
- Mary Morello, 102, American activist, founder of Parents for Rock and Rap.
- Roger Penn, 77, British sociologist and writer.
- Poomani, 79, Indian novelist (Agnaadi) and poet.
- Rui Resende, 88, Brazilian actor (Dona Flor and Her Two Husbands, Roque Santeiro).
- Gennady Russkikh, 81, Russian politician, Kirov Oblast MLA (1997–2017).
- Luis Sanguino, 91, Spanish sculptor.
- Chris Scheuer, 73, Austrian comic book author and illustrator.
- Muhammad Jamiruddin Sircar, 94, Bangladeshi barrister and politician, acting president (2002), minister of education (1991–1996), and speaker of the Jatiya Sangsad (2001–2009).
- Mary Otis Stevens, 98, American architect (Lincoln House).
- Vernon Taylor, 88, American rockabilly singer.
- Hamad bin Khalifa Al Thani, 74, Qatari royal, emir (1995–2013).
- Gita Upadhyay, 87, Indian writer and translator.
- Karl Weber, 90, German politician, MP (1969–1980), member of the Landtag of Baden-Württemberg (1980–1992).
- David Willey, 93, British journalist (BBC, Reuters), heart failure.
- Syed Yasin, 69, Indian politician, Karnataka MLA (1999–2004, 2008–2013).

=== 13 ===
- Ackbar Abbas, 84, Hong Kong literary scholar.
- Alcides Bernal, 60, Brazilian politician, Mato Grosso do Sul MLA (2011–2013) and mayor of Campo Grande (2013–2014, 2015–2016).
- John Berne, 72, Northern Irish-born Australian rugby league (South Sydney Rabbitohs, Cronulla-Sutherland Sharks) and union (national team) player, complications from dementia.
- Mike Browning, 62, American musician (Morbid Angel, Nocturnus).
- Pedro Ignacio Calderón, 92, Argentine musician and conductor.
- Joe Caldwell, 97, American television writer (Dark Shadows, NBC Matinee Theater, The Secret Storm).
- Md. Nazrul Islam Chowdhury, 74, Bangladeshi politician, MP (2014–2024), cancer.
- Jameson Currier, 70, American writer.
- Marcel Deneux, 97, French politician, senator (1995–2014).
- Barry Dickins, 76, Australian author, artist and actor.
- Rob Dieperink, 38, Dutch football referee (Eredivisie, UEFA Euro 2024).
- Fred Dudley, 81, American politician, member of the Florida Senate (1986–1998).
- Denyse Émond, 98, Canadian actress and comedian, complications from Alzheimer's disease.
- Melaine Favennec, 75, French singer and musician.
- Georg Ferstl, 89, Austrian politician, member of the Landtag of Styria (2000–2005).
- Gérald Guillemin, 77–78, French organ builder.
- Hervé Hasquin, 83, Belgian historian and politician, minister-president of the French Community (1999–2004).
- Jo Wan-kyu, 98, South Korean politician, minister of education (1992–1993).
- Charlie King, 83, American football player (Buffalo Bills, Cincinnati Bengals).
- Dudley Laufman, 95, American contra dance caller and musician.
- Manfred Manglitz, 86, German footballer (MSV Duisburg, 1. FC Köln, West Germany national team).
- Sir Sam Neill, 78, Northern Irish-born New Zealand actor (Jurassic Park, The Piano, Event Horizon), pneumonia.
- Viorel Oancea, 81, Romanian politician and major general, mayor of Timișoara (1992–1996).
- Pat Oliphant, 90, Australian-born American political cartoonist (The Denver Post, The Washington Star), Pulitzer Prize winner (1967).
- Erkki Pystynen, 96, Finnish politician, speaker of the Parliament of Finland (1983–1986).
- Raymond Razakarinvony, 98, Malagasy Roman Catholic prelate, bishop of Miarinarivo (1998–2007).
- Nansun Shi, 74, Hong Kong film producer and executive (All the Wrong Clues for the Right Solution, Infernal Affairs, The Thousand Faces of Dunjia), multiple organ dysfunction.
- Michael Stürmer, 87, German historian.
- Harry Swinney, 87, American physicist.
- Joseph Wasko, 94, French racing cyclist.

=== 14 ===
- Elsa Aguirre, 95, Mexican actress (Midnight, A Decent Woman, Giant).
- Béatrice Altariba, 87, French actress (Eyes Without a Face, Totò Diabolicus, Les Misérables).
- Margarita Andrey, 99, Spanish actress (They Always Return at Dawn, His Heart Awake, Devil's Roundup).
- Elena Baranová, 80, Slovak linguist and philologist.
- Alexander Barsukov, 71, Russian politician, Republic of Karelia MLA (1998–2002, 2006–2011).
- Markus Beierle, 54, German footballer (SSV Ulm, MSV Duisburg, Eintracht Frankfurt).
- Wolfgang Brase, 87, German footballer (Eintracht Braunschweig).
- Sitesh Ranjan Deb, 75, Bangladeshi wildlife conservationist.
- Cees Geel, 61, Dutch actor (Simon, Anne Frank: The Whole Story, Too Fat Too Furious), cardiac arrest.
- Ramachandra Gowda, 87, Indian politician, Karnataka MLC (1988–2018).
- Sheikh Mustafa Kamal, 83, Indian politician, Jammu & Kashmir MLA (1987–2002).
- Galina Kukleva, 53, Russian biathlete, Olympic champion (1998) and three-time world champion.
- José Legrá, 83, Cuban-born Spanish boxer, WBC featherweight champion (1968–1969, 1972–1973).
- Little Gerhard, 92, Swedish singer, musician and songwriter ("Ska vi plocka körsbär i min trädgård?").
- Hans Michael Maitzen, 83, Austrian astronomer.
- Roger Martin, 74, British actor (EastEnders, Anna Lee, The Merchant of Venice) and theatre director.
- Janice McNair, 89, American football executive (Houston Texans).
- Fantan Mojah, 49, Jamaican reggae singer, heart complications.
- Azucena Mora, 80, Ecuadorian theater and television actress.
- Mudragada Padmanabham, 73, Indian politician, MP (1999–2004) and Andhra Pradesh MLA (1978–1994), kidney disease.
- John E. Steele, 77, American jurist, judge of the U.S. District Court for the Middle District of Florida (since 2000).
- Neliana Tersigni, 81, Italian journalist (TG3).
- Guy Tudor, 91, American ornithologist, bird illustrator and conservationist.
- Lee Underwood, 87–88, American musician and journalist.
- William Wisher Jr., 71, American screenwriter (Terminator 2: Judgment Day, Judge Dredd, Exorcist: The Beginning).

=== 15 ===
- Udo Brecht, 83, German Olympic rower (1968).
- Jim Corrigall, 80, Canadian football player (Toronto Argonauts) and coach (Kent State Golden Flashes).
- Myra Dinnerstein, 92, American women's studies advocate.
- Don Duguid, 91, Canadian curler, world champion (1970, 1971).
- Vladyslav Duyun, 49, Ukrainian-Russian footballer (Spartak Moscow, Rostselmash, Sokol Saratov), pancreatic cancer.
- John Esposito, 86, American academic and writer (Islam: The Straight Path).
- Ron Hunt, 85, American baseball player (New York Mets, San Francisco Giants, Montreal Expos).
- Marguerite Johnson, 60–61, Australian classicist, traffic collision.
- Plas Johnson, 94, American soul-jazz saxophonist.
- John Kirby, 75, American actor (Nutcracker: Money, Madness and Murder) and coach (Jim Caviezel), complications from amyotrophic lateral sclerosis.
- Maro Kontou, 92, Greek actress (And the Wife Shall Revere Her Husband, Woe to the Young) and politician, MP (1999–2004, 2006–2007), lung cancer.
- Herbert Laming, Baron Laming, 89, British social worker and life peer, member of the House of Lords (since 1998).
- Max O'Halloran, 74, Australian footballer (Footscray, Carlton).
- Piotr Oczko, 53, Polish philologist, art historian and translator.
- Denise Oliver-Velez, 78, American activist and community organizer, cancer.
- Moozhikkal Pankajakshi, 90, Indian Nokkuvidya puppeteer.
- Don Ross, 92, Australian footballer (North Albury, Western Bulldogs).
- Guy Scott, 82, Zambian politician, acting president (2014–2015), vice president (2011–2014), and twice MP.
- Seputla Sebogodi, 63, South African actor (Generations, Rhythm City, Scandal!), complications from diabetes.
- Randolph Thummel, 80, American chemist.
- Hal Williams, 91, American actor (227, Sanford and Son, Private Benjamin).
- Tim Peters, 74, American software engineer, creator of Timsort hybrid sorting algorithm and major contributor to Python programming language and CPython.

=== 16 ===
- Siva Afi, 77, Samoan professional wrestler (WWF), complications from diabetes.
- Enrique Bacigalupo, 88, Argentine-Spanish lawyer and jurist, judge of the Supreme Court of Spain (1987–2011).
- Johan Baumann, 91, Norwegian dogsledder, politician, and sports administrator, president of the Norwegian Ski Federation (1987–1995).
- Elza Berquó, 100, Brazilian mathematician and statistician.
- Angelo Buccarello, 84, Italian Catholic priest.
- Lattie F. Coor, 89, American university administrator, president of the University of Vermont (1976–1989) and Arizona State University (1990–2002).
- Manuel Doreste, 68, Spanish Olympic sailor (2000).
- Feras Esmaeel, 43, Syrian footballer (Al-Karamah, Zakho, national team), traffic collision.
- Brenda Fricker, 81, Irish actress (My Left Foot, Home Alone 2: Lost in New York, A Time to Kill), Oscar winner (1990).
- Eberhard Gill, 64–65, German physicist and space systems engineer.
- Renato Machado, 83, Brazilian newscaster and journalist (TV Globo).
- Rudolph A. Marcus, 102, Canadian-born American chemist, Nobel Prize laureate (1992).
- Tersia Marshall, 45, South African politician, Mpumalanga MPL (since 2024), traffic collision.
- Chiang C. Mei, 91, American physicist.
- Jean-Jacques Naudo, 67, French rugby league player (Baroudeurs de Pia XIII, XIII Catalan) and gangster.
- Lutz von Padberg, 76, German historian.
- Norman Ravitch, 89, American historian.
- Bruce Smith, 82, Australian footballer (Richmond).
- Isamu Sonoda, 79, Japanese judoka, Olympic champion (1976).
- Kristjan Svirgsden, 71, Estonian film director.
- Roland J. Thornhill, 90, Canadian politician, Nova Scotia MLA (1974–1993).
- Ronald Trubuhovich, 97, New Zealand medical doctor.
- Patrick Tse, 89, Hong Kong actor (The Legend of the Condor Heroes, Shaolin Soccer, Time), pneumonia.
- René Urtreger, 92, French bebop pianist.
- Alan Walden, 83, American music manager (Lynyrd Skynyrd, Otis Redding), founder of Capricorn Records.

=== 17 ===
- Osvaldo Bagnoli, 91, Italian football player (AC Milan) and manager (Hellas Verona, Inter Milan).
- Germain Berthé, 32, Malian footballer (Horoya AC, Real Bamako, national team).
- Sir Bill Birch, 92, New Zealand politician, MP (1972–1999), minister of energy (1978–1984) and finance (1993–1999).
- Primrose Bogatsu, South African politician, North West MPL (since 2023).
- Melvin R. Brown, 88, American politician, member of the Utah House of Representatives (2007–2017).
- Gabriel Antonio Camilo González, 88, Dominican Roman Catholic prelate, bishop of La Vega (1992–2015).
- Freddy Cannon, 89, American singer ("Tallahassee Lassie", "Palisades Park"), cancer.
- Louis Champagne, 78, Canadian talk radio personality.
- Richard J. Estes, 84, American academic.
- William Gehrlein, 80, American academic and researcher.
- Graeme Gilbert, 76, Australian radio presenter (2SM, Super Radio Network) and politician, leukaemia.
- Martin E. Johnstone, 77, American lawyer and judge.
- Oh Jang-seop, 79, South Korean politician, MP (1992–1996, 1997–2004), minister of construction and transport (2001).
- Clément Schertzinger, 89, French sporting director, president of FICEP (2003–2009).
- Sir Garfield Sobers, 89, Barbadian cricketer (Nottinghamshire, South Australia, national team).
- Tohjiro, 70, Japanese adult video director and screenwriter.
- Bohumil Vacík, c. 73, Czech convicted serial killer. (death announced on this date)
- C. D. Wickramaratne, 63, Sri Lankan police officer, inspector general (2020–2023), suicide by gunshot.

=== 18 ===
- Sergei Agashkov, 63, Turkmen football player (SKA Rostov-on-Don, Torpedo Moscow) and manager (FShM Moscow).
- Joseph Algazy, 87, Israeli historian and journalist (Haaretz, Le Monde diplomatique).
- Moses Ali, 87, Ugandan military officer and politician, deputy prime minister (1989–1991, 2013–2026).
- Joan Brigham, 89, American art historian.
- Gianni Cazzola, 88, Italian jazz drummer, heart attack.
- Tom Chadbon, 80, English actor (Doctor Who, Tess, Casino Royale).
- Chen Gang, 91, Chinese composer (Butterfly Lovers' Violin Concerto).
- John Chittick, 88, Australian Olympic hurdler (1956, 1960).
- Zdeněk Chovanec, 21, Czech-Portuguese-Venezuelan racing driver (FIA Formula 3).
- Jayden Dalke, 30, Canadian football player (Saskatchewan Roughriders), traffic collision.
- Heinz Dieterich, 82–83, German sociologist and political analyst.
- Terence Donovan, 90, British-born Australian actor (Home and Away, Neighbours, Breaker Morant).
- Scott Dureau, 39, Australian rugby league player (Newcastle Knights, Catalans Dragons), brain cancer.
- Salah Farzit, 73, Tunisian singer and composer.
- Jennifer Finch, 59, American musician (L7), songwriter ("Everglade") and photographer, brain cancer.
- Ian Gatford, 86, English Anglican clergyman, archdeacon of Derby (1993–2005).
- Jim Gilstrap, 79, American soul singer ("Swing Your Daddy").
- Stanisław Gomułka, 85, Polish economist and academic.
- Chennamma Deve Gowda, 89, Indian political figure, spouse of the prime minister (1996–1997), cardiac arrest.
- Michael Hendricks, 84, American-Canadian gay rights advocate, assisted suicide.
- Alexandria Holloway, 79, American music educator, breast cancer.
- Kenneth Jeyaretnam, 67, Singaporean politician and hedge fund manager.
- Kim Joong-wi, 86, South Korean politician, MP (1985–2000), minister of the environment (1994–1995).
- Walt McKee, 77, Northern Irish-born Canadian football player (Winnipeg Blue Bombers, Edmonton Eskimos).
- Tim Murphy, 73, American politician, member of the U.S. House of Representatives (2003–2017) and Pennsylvania Senate (1996–2003), heart attack.
- Bruno Recoura, 78, French basketball player (ASVEL Basket, national team) and coach (Élan Chalon).
- Clint Reilly, 79, American real estate investor and newspaper publisher (San Francisco Examiner).
- Dimitar Sakhanikov, 83, Bulgarian Olympic basketball player (1968).
- Denny Sanford, 90, American banker and philanthropist, founder of First Premier Bank.
- Sergey Sholokhov, 67, Russian film critic, journalist and television presenter.
- Geoff Somers, 76, British explorer.
- Edward Stourton, 68, British broadcaster and presenter (Sunday, Today), prostate cancer.
- James R. Urbaniak, 90, American orthopedic surgeon.
- Alberto Velázquez, 92, Uruguayan Olympic cyclist.
- Duane Ward, 62, American baseball player (Toronto Blue Jays, Atlanta Braves), World Series champion (1992, 1993).
- Robert Wiremu, 55, New Zealand composer and baritone singer.

=== 19 ===
- Christine Borland, 60, Scottish artist.
- Holger Brück, 78, German football player (KSV Hessen Kassel, Hertha Berlin) and manager (KSV Hessen Kassel).
- John Droney, 79, American politician.
- Toshiaki Fushimi, 50, Japanese keirin cyclist, Olympic silver medalist (2004), traffic collision.
- Patrick Gleeson, 91, American composer and musician.
- Sidney H. Griffith, 87–88, American academic (Catholic University of America).
- Richard Heinberg, 75, American journalist and ecologist, pancreatic cancer.
- Philippe Josse, 65, French civil servant, member of the Conseil d'État (since 2011).
- Gregory Karotemprel, 93, Indian Syro-Malabar Catholic hierarch, bishop of Rajkot (1983–2010).
- Venceslas Kruta, 86, French archaeologist and historian.
- Vladimir Kuznetsov, 81, Russian Olympic cyclist (1968, 1972).
- Peter Lassally, 93, German-born American television producer (The Tonight Show).
- Jim Lindsey, 81, American football player (Minnesota Vikings).
- Antonio Martínez Aneiros, 93, Spanish politician and priest, member of the Parliament of Galicia (1985–1989).
- Carlos Miguens Bemberg, 77, Argentine brewer and mining industry executive, cancer.
- Jennifer Monserrate, 56, Indian politician, Goa MLA (since 2012).
- Israel Pincas, 91, Bulgarian-born Israeli poet.
- Nikolay Ryabushenko, 64, Russian politician, Altai Krai MLA (2004–2008).
- Winfried Schittges, 79, German politician, member of the Landtag of North Rhine-Westphalia (1990–2017).
- Christopher Senyonjo, 94, Ugandan Anglican bishop and LGBT rights campaigner.
- Dale Steele, 70, American college football coach (Campbell Fighting Camels), cancer.
- Morley Torgov, 98, Canadian novelist and humorist.
- Esmaeil Yaghmaei, 84, Iranian archaeologist and writer.
- Jaroslav Zvěřina, 83, Czech politician, MEP (2004–2009) and MP (1996–2004).

=== 20 ===
- Ahn Dong-seon, 90, South Korean politician, MP (1985–1988, 1992–2004).
- Charlie Brueckman, 90, American football player (Washington Redskins, Los Angeles Chargers).
- Chang Chang-sun, 84, South Korean wrestler, Olympic silver medalist (1964).
- Philippe Chaulet, 83, French Guadeloupean politician, member of the National Assembly (1993–2002) and mayor of Bouillante (1984–2005).
- David R. Cooke, 88, Canadian politician, Ontario MPP (1985–1990).
- Françoise Coquet, 83, French television producer and screenwriter, complications from dementia with Lewy bodies.
- Vibert Cornwall, 87, Vincentian jazz singer.
- Günther Czichon, 96, German politician, member of the Bürgerschaft of Bremen (1967–1975, 1983–1984), member of the Senate of Bremen (1979–1983).
- Amor Deloso, 87, Filipino politician, governor of Zambales (1986–1998, 2007–2010, 2016–2019).
- John C. Dvorak, 80, American tech writer and broadcaster.
- Werner Enke, 85, German film actor (Degree of Murder, Go for It, Baby, Don't Fumble, Darling) and screenwriter.
- Marvin Goldman, 98, American radiation biologist.
- Roy Jackson, 94, British chemical engineer.
- John Jansen, 78, Canadian politician, British Columbia MLA (1986–1991).
- Eddie Joyal, 86, Canadian ice hockey player (Los Angeles Kings, Edmonton Oilers, Detroit Red Wings).
- Kevin Keegan, 75, English football player (Liverpool, national team) and manager (Newcastle United), stomach cancer.
- Joachim Kerzel, 84, German voice actor (The Great Cheese Robbery) and dubber (Jack Nicholson).
- Carl Kunasek, 94, American politician, member of the Arizona House of Representatives (1973–1983), member (1983–1989) and president (1987–1989) of the Arizona Senate.
- Terry Lewis, 90, British politician, MP (1983–2005).
- Celedonio Lima, 86, Argentine Olympic boxer (1960).
- David Lucas, 58, Spanish politician, secretary of state for transport (2023), senator (2016–2019), and mayor of Móstoles (2015–2018), cancer.
- Francesco Massaro, 90, Italian film director (Il generale dorme in piedi, Il lupo e l'agnello, Private Affairs).
- Sir Christopher Ondaatje, 93, Sri Lankan-born Canadian-English businessman, philanthropist and Olympic bobsledder (1964).
- Zale Parry, 93, American scuba diver and actress (Kingdom of the Sea, Sea Hunt, Tillamook Treasure).
- John A. Polk, 77, American politician, member of the Mississippi State Senate (2012–2026).
- Bruce Rogers, 92, Canadian broadcast journalist (CBC).
- Hans Roordink, 82, Dutch footballer (Enschedese Boys, Twente, Heracles).
- Derek Ryder, 79, English footballer (Rochdale, Southport, Cardiff City). (death announced on this date)
- Daniel Siad, 68, Swedish-French modeling scout.
- Edwin Smith, 92, English cricketer (Derbyshire).
- Alexis Stamatis, 66, Greek writer, blood disorder.
- Claudio Strunz, 59, Argentine thrash metal drummer (Hermética, Malón).
- Rang Thurapon, 69, Thai politician, MP (since 2023).
- Eva Viežnaviec, 54, Belarusian writer and journalist, cancer.

=== 21 ===
- Anicia Berton, 50, Martiniquais environmental and social activist, cancer.
- Béla Bodó, 67, Hungarian hurdler.
- Scott Brown, 69, American baseball player (Cincinnati Reds).
- Mitch Byrd, 63, American comic book artist (Green Lantern: Mosaic, The Hero System Bestiary), heart attack.
- Pauline Clayden, 103, British ballerina (Sadler's Wells Royal Ballet).
- Jordan Devey, 38, American football player (New England Patriots, Kansas City Chiefs), suicide.
- Brian Doerksen, 60, Canadian Christian singer-songwriter (Hungry, Holy God), cancer.
- Charles Gaines, 84, American writer (Pumping Iron), co-inventor of paintball.
- Stephen Gollogly, 41, Irish Gaelic footballer (Monaghan).
- Kaylee Hottle, 18, American actress (Godzilla vs. Kong, Godzilla x Kong: The New Empire), traffic collision.
- R. W. Johnson, 82, English-born South African historian and academic, infection.
- Olivera Katarina, 86, Serbian actress (I Even Met Happy Gypsies, Goya or the Hard Way to Enlightenment, Death and the Dervish) and singer.
- Kim Hyeong-gwang, 91, South Korean politician, MP (1979–1980, 1985–1988).
- Bill McGlaughlin, 82, American composer and radio host (Exploring Music, Saint Paul Sunday), cardiac arrest.
- Fernando Menezes, 74, Portuguese lawyer and politician, president (2000–2008) and member of the Legislative Assembly of the Azores (1992–2008).
- Tofig Mirzoyev, 94, Azerbaijani actor (The Last Night of Childhood, Tahmina, Nesimi).
- Héctor Ochoa Cárdenas, 91, Colombian musician and composer (El camino de la vida).
- Edgar C. Otálvora, 66, Venezuelan journalist and historian.
- Milton Scaron, 89, Uruguayan basketball player, Olympic bronze medalist (1956).
- Ruby Kless Sondock, 100, American judge, associate justice of the Supreme Court of Texas (1982).
- Jean-Marc Sylvestre, 79, French journalist (TF1, i>Télé, RT France).
- Olaf Tufte, 50, Norwegian rower, Olympic champion (2004, 2008).
- Josep Vallverdú, 103, Spanish Catalan writer and linguist.
- Erwin Vandendaele, 81, Belgian football player (Club Brugge, national team) and manager (Gent).
- James Woolsey, 84, American lawyer, U.S. under secretary of the Navy (1977–1979) and director of central intelligence (1993–1995), stroke.

=== 22 ===
- Alambadi, 90, Indian politician, Uttar Pradesh MLA (1996–2007, since 2012).
- Purificação Araújo, 99, Portuguese obstetrician and gynecologist.
- Eiji Bandō, 86, Japanese baseball player (Chunichi Dragons) and entertainer, heart failure.
- Luiz Carlos Barreto, 98, Brazilian film producer (Four Days in September, The Priest and the Girl, Garrincha: Hero of the Jungle) and screenwriter, pneumonia.
- Frank Barrow, 83, English rugby league player (St Helens, Leigh) and coach (Swinton).
- Bruno Betancor, 22, Uruguayan footballer (Peñarol), cardiac arrest.
- Émile Constant Bombet, 85, Ivorian politician.
- Vera Cudjoe, 97–98, Canadian actress (Jumping the Broom, Da Kink in My Hair, Rookie Blue).
- David Douglas, 12th Marquess of Queensberry, 96, British aristocrat and pottery designer.
- Shir-Mohammad Espandar, 98, Iranian musician.
- Fernando, 72, Brazilian footballer (Santos, Londrina, Guarani).
- Gordon G. Gallup, 85, American psychologist.
- Axel Ganz, 88, German journalist (Bunte, Gruner + Jahr).
- Huang Zhiquan, 84, Chinese politician, governor of Jiangxi (2001–2006).
- Celina Jesionowska, 92, Polish athlete, Olympic bronze medalist (1960).
- Oliver Jones, 91, Canadian jazz pianist.
- Kim Jong-im, 90–91, North Korean politician. (death announced on this date)
- Mary Linda, 90, Greek singer.
- Henry Zvi Lothane, 92, Polish-born American psychiatrist.
- Paddy McNally, 88, British businessman and racing driver.
- Omololu Meroyi, 76, Nigerian politician, senator (1999–2003).
- Chris Murphy, 58, American politician, member of the South Carolina House of Representatives (2011–2026).
- Ingar Tore Narvhus, 98, Norwegian air force general, chief of the Royal Norwegian Air Force (1978–1981).
- Barbara L. Nichols, 87, American nurse and administrator, president of the American Nurses Association (1978–1982).
- Waldtraut Oertel, 89, German Olympic diver (1960).
- Luís Represas, 69, Portuguese singer and composer, lung cancer.
- Chuck Russell, 74, American film director (The Mask, A Nightmare on Elm Street 3: Dream Warriors, Eraser) and screenwriter.
- Semere Russom, 82, Eritrean politician and diplomat, ambassador to the United States (1997–2001).
- John Sheffield, 89, British physicist.
- Greg Sewell, 93, Australian football player (Essendon) and coach (Kyneton, Essendon).
- James Sloyan, 85, American actor (The Sting, Oh Madeline, Xanadu).
- Heinz Stücke, 86, German long-distance cyclist.
- Wang Quanying, 105, Chinese Red Army soldier, last living female soldier of the Long March.
- Haim Yavin, 93, Israeli television anchor (Channel 1) and documentary filmmaker (The Land of the Settlers).

=== 23 ===
- M. Basri, 83, Indonesian football manager (Persiba Bantul, national team).
- Ossie Blanco, 80, Venezuelan baseball player (Chicago White Sox, Cleveland Indians).
- Oleg Bolotin, 87, Russian politician, member of the Volgograd Oblast Duma (1998–2009).
- Timothy Burrill, 95, British film producer (Chariots of Fire, The Fourth Protocol, Supergirl).
- Karen Busby, 67, Canadian lawyer and feminist author.
- Jury Chaščavacki, 78, Belarusian film director and screenwriter (Kalinovski Square).
- Hope Clarke, 85, American actress (A Piece of the Action, Seventeen Again, Rustin).
- Annie Courtney, Northern Irish politician, member of the Derry City Council (1985–2005) and MLA (2000–2003).
- Patricia Donlon, 83, Irish librarian and academic.
- Jean-Pierre Dorléac, 83, French-born American costume designer (Battlestar Galactica, The Blue Lagoon, Somewhere in Time).
- Hanna Drul, 65, Ukrainian ceramics artist, cancer.
- Charles R. Hamm, 92, American Air Force general, superintendent of the Air Force Academy (1987–1991).
- Keigo Higashino, 68, Japanese author (The Devotion of Suspect X, Journey Under the Midnight Sun), colorectal cancer.
- Pavel Jungwirth, 60, Czech physical chemist, suicide.
- Fred Kemp, 80, English footballer (Halifax Town, Southampton, Blackpool).
- William Richard King, 87, American academic.
- Clemente Marconi, 60, Italian-American archaeologist and art historian.
- K. Ali Kutty Musliyar, 81, Indian Islamic scholar.
- Shanthie Naidoo, 91, South African anti-apartheid activist.
- Thembeni Nxangisa, South African politician, Free State MPL (since 2019).
- Kōzō Okamoto, 78, Japanese-Lebanese communist militant and mass murderer (Lod Airport massacre).
- William Orbit, 69, English musician, songwriter ("Feel Good Time"), and record producer (Ray of Light, 13).
- Rosemary Parslow, 90, British naturalist and conservationist.
- Nicholas Platt, 90, American diplomat, ambassador to Pakistan (1991–1992), the Philippines (1987–1991), and Zambia (1982–1984).
- Dame Helene Quilter, 73, New Zealand public servant.
- Paul Sanasardo, 97, American dancer and choreographer.
- Joseph Santamaria, 78, Australian judge.
- Jose Sison, 88, Filipino lawyer and television host (Ipaglaban Mo!).
- Asteryth Sloane, 26, British composer and poet. (death announced on this date)
- Osvaldo Tozzi, 95, Italian politician, president of the Province of Pisa (1986–1990).
- Rémi Trotereau, 70, French painter and sculptor.
- Wiesława Ziółkowska, 76, Polish politician, MP (1989–1997).

=== 24 ===
- Akbar Abdi, 65, Iranian actor (The Tenants, Mother, Ekhrajiha), heart attack.
- Sumarjati Arjoso, 80, Indonesian politician, MP (2009–2014, 2018–2019).
- Bert Askson, 80, American football player (Green Bay Packers).
- Sheila Ballantine, 97, English actress.
- Günter Bannas, 74, German journalist (FAZ).
- Azriel Blackman, 100, American airline mechanic.
- Richard Brickhouse, 87, American racing driver (NASCAR), Talladega 500 winner (1969).
- Steven Brower, 74, American graphic designer.
- Reg Chard, 102, Australian World War II veteran (Kokoda Track campaign).
- Chun Yong-taek, 88, South Korean politician, MP (1996–2004), minister of national defense (1998–1999).
- Jackie Cline, 66, American football player (Miami Dolphins, Pittsburgh Steelers, Detroit Lions).
- Gunther von Hagens, 81, German anatomist, inventor of plastination, cerebral haemorrhage complicated by Parkinson's disease.
- Sir John Henry, 94, New Zealand jurist, judge of the Court of Appeal (1991–2004).
- John Horam, Baron Horam, 87, British politician, MP (1970–1983, 1992–2010) and member of the House of Lords (since 2013), complications from a fall.
- Bill Jersey, 99, American artist and filmmaker (Super Chief: The Life and Legacy of Earl Warren).
- Lou Koller, 59, American punk rock singer (Sick of It All), esophageal cancer.
- Ian McDonald, 93, Trinidadian-born Guyanese poet and writer.
- Lamine Merbah, 79, Algerian filmmaker.
- Jean Mesqui, 74, French castellologist and engineer.
- Elmer MacKay, 89, Canadian politician, MP (1971–1983, 1984–1993).
- Horacio Muratore, 74, Argentine basketball executive, president of FIBA (2014–2019).
- Loren Nerell, 65, American composer. (death announced on this date)
- Mary de Rachewiltz, 101, Italian-American writer (Discretions) and poet.
- Odile Sicard, 95, French politician, deputy (1981–1988).
- Suco, 87, Spanish footballer (Racing Ferrol, Barcelona, Valencia), lung infection.
- Kalilou Traoré, 38, Malian footballer (Istra 1961, Real Bamako, national team), traffic collision.
- Achito Vivas, 92, Colombian footballer (Deportivo Pereira, national team), kidney failure.
- Allan Warrack, 89, Canadian politician, Alberta MLA (1971–1979).
- Richard Whiley, 90, English cricketer (Dorset, Oxford University, Gloucestershire).
- Zhang Yutai, 80, Chinese politician.

=== 25 ===
- José Ignacio Ascasibar Zarrao, 82, Spanish road racing cyclist.
- Ayo Bamgbose, 94, Nigerian linguist.
- Ján Barkóci, 67, Slovak footballer (Spartak Trnava).
- Marie-Paule Belle, 80, French singer, breast cancer.
- Daniel Bohr, 82, Argentine-born Danish theater manager.
- Àngel Caldas i Bosch, 98, Spanish Roman Catholic priest.
- Mike Clock, 90, American wrestling coach (Pacific University).
- Ambrogio Colombo, 86, Italian racing cyclist.
- Rosemary Crumlin, 93, Australian art historian and educator.
- Vitaliy Dakhivnyk, 53, Ukrainian sculptor.
- Juan Carlos Distéfano, 92, Argentine sculptor.
- Branislav Drobnjak, 65, Montenegrin footballer (Budućnost Titograd, Jedinstvo Bijelo Polje, Yugoslavia national team).
- Charles Sam Faddis, 68, American intelligence operations officer (CIA).
- Paul Fogelberg, 90, Finnish geographer and academic (University of Helsinki).
- Józef Hulka, 100, Polish sculptor.
- Gilbert Kanyankore, 72, Rwandan football manager (Vital'O, APR, national team).
- Taizo Kawada, 82, Japanese golf critic and course designer.
- Helen Konek, 95, Canadian Inuk elder.
- Richard Lerblance, 80, American politician, member of the Oklahoma House of Representatives (2002–2003) and Senate (2003–2012).
- Leung Choi-yuen, 75, Hong Kong television producer.
- Juan Carlos Lomeña, 72, Spanish politician, deputy (1991–1993), mayor of Coín (1993–1995).
- Thomas W. Luce III, 86, American government official, cardiac arrest.
- Saku Machino, 82, Japanese criminal law scholar, professor of Sophia University.
- Leonid Margolin, 68, Russian musician.
- Michael McNay, 91, British journalist (The Guardian) and author.
- Hirokazu Mizuta, 88, Japanese business executive, president of Tokyu Department Store.
- Māzin Mubārak, 95, Syrian writer.
- Jérémie Gustave Nzamba, 66, Gabonese journalist (Radio Africa).
- Bill Oddie, 85, English wildlife presenter (Springwatch, Birding with Bill Oddie) and comedian (The Goodies).
- Sabri Al-Ramahi, 78, Iraqi television director (Al Jazeera Arabic).
- Pekka Raudaskoski, 98, Finnish physician.
- Volker Schmidt-Gertenbach, 84, German musician and conductor.
- Shi Baoyuan, 89, Chinese soldier, lieutenant general of the Chinese People's Liberation Army.
- Václav Šimon, 100, Czech urologist.
- Albert Sorensen, 94, American politician, member of the Iowa Senate (1991–1997).
- Laura Spector, 71, American vine artist.
- Ekaterina Verzilina, 96, Russian farming leader.
- Ronny Woodruff, 83, American biologist and zoologist.

=== 26 ===
- Bachtiar Aly, 76, Indonesian politician and diplomat, MP (2014–2019) and ambassador to Egypt (2002–2005).
- Suneil Anand, 70, Indian actor (Anand Aur Anand, Main Tere Liye), heart attack.
- John Anderson, 71, American baseball player and coach (Minnesota Golden Gophers), heart attack.
- Adolf Bauer, 86, German politician, president of SoVD.
- Hira Singh Bisht, 85, Indian politician, Uttarakhand MLA (2002–2007, 2014–2017), heart attack.
- Parvez Butt, 83, Pakistani mechanical engineer, chairman of PAEC (2001–2006).
- Gilberto Cárdenas, 79, American sociologist and art collector.
- John Carro, 98, American judge.
- Joel Cohen, 84, American musician.
- Ravan A. G. Farhâdi, 96, Afghan academic and diplomat, ambassador to the United Nations (1993–2006).
- Octavio Gallotti, 95, Brazilian judge, minister (1984–2000) and president (1991, 1993–1995) of the Supreme Federal Court.
- Robert Hallinen, 77, American journalist (Anchorage Daily News), cancer.
- Kitaseumi Hiromitsu, 78, Japanese sumo wrestler.
- Thomas Hines, 89, American architectural historian.
- George Israel, 78, American politician, mayor of Macon, Georgia (1979–1987).
- Gerry Kelly, 77, Northern Irish broadcaster (Kelly).
- Milan Knížák, 86, Czech artist, rector of the AVU (1990–1997) and director of the NGP (1999–2011).
- Jerry Lamb, 85, American Episcopal prelate, bishop of Northern California (1992–2006).
- Gisela Kubon-Gilke, 69, German economist.
- Lu Shichen, 78, Chinese economist.
- Pié Masumbuko, 94, Burundian politician, acting prime minister (1965).
- Udo Margedant, 84, German political scientist, president of Cartellverband.
- Zdzisław Maszkiewicz, 75, Polish politician, senator (1997–2001).
- Isabel McBryde, 92, Australian archaeologist.
- Vlasta Pavelcová, 94, Czech ballerina.
- Adolfo Porrata, 78, Cuban Olympic basketball player (1968).
- Angelo Romero, 86, Italian baritone.
- Lyudmila Rudakova, 88, Kazakh ballerina.
- Betye Saar, 99, American artist.
- Alfonso Sánchez Anaya, 85, Mexican politician, deputy (1994–1997), governor of Tlaxcala (1999–2005), and senator (2006–2012).
- Ignacio Sánchez-Carpintero Plano, 83, Spanish geologist.
- Boris Shapiro, 82, Russian-born German poet, member of European Physical Society.
- Rainer Strobelt, 79, German writer.
- Esther Tomljanovich, 94, American judge, justice of the Minnesota Supreme Court (1990–1998), heart failure.
- Frank Tusa, 79, American bassist and composer.
- Wang Kai, 43, Taiwanese actor.
- Sir Ian Wood, 84, Scottish engineering and consulting executive, founder of the Wood Group.

=== 27 ===
- Ted Craig, 86, Australian-born British theatre director.
- Ursula Hegi, 80, German-born American author (Floating in My Mother's Palm, Stones from the River), complications from a stroke.
- Marc Held, 93, French architect, photographer and interior designer.
- Bill Hewitt, 81, American basketball player (Detroit Pistons, Los Angeles Lakers, Chicago Bulls).
- René Hicks, 70, American actress and comedian.
- Roy Hodson, 95, British archaeologist.
- Jerry Hopkins, 85, American football player (Denver Broncos, Miami Dolphins, Oakland Raiders).
- Jim Hopkins, 79, New Zealand broadcaster and politician, member of the Waitaki District Council (since 2007).
- Zlatan Ibrahimbegović, 78, Bosnian Olympic slalom canoeist (1972).
- Turid Iversen, 91, Norwegian politician, deputy MP (1993–1997), mayor of Drammen (1987–1995).
- Anna Knysok, 75, Polish politician, MP (1989–1993).
- Johannes Krisch, 59, Austrian actor (Revanche, Jack, The Phoenician Scheme).
- Phyllida Law, 94, Scottish actress (Kingdom, Much Ado About Nothing, Peter's Friends).
- Ronnie Le Drew, 78, Canadian-born British puppeteer (Rainbow, The Muppet Christmas Carol, Labyrinth).
- Lim Soo Peng, 97–98, Singaporean businessman and politician, MP (1968–1970).
- Lucy López, 96, Chilean high jumper.
- Takeaki Matsumoto, 67, Japanese politician, MP (2000–2026), minister of foreign affairs (2011) and internal affairs (2022–2024), complications from amyotrophic lateral sclerosis.
- Tim O'Donnell, 77, American television producer and writer (Growing Pains, Dave's World, Phil of the Future), bladder cancer.
- Sulemana Abdul Samed, 32, Ghanaian record holder, nation's tallest man.
- Golam Sarwar Hiru, 76, Bangladeshi politician, MP (1996–2001).
- Susanta Singh, 53, Indian politician, Odisha MLA (since 2014).
- Kevin Sinnott, 78, Welsh painter.
- Léon Strauss, 98, French historian and academic.
- Aviezer Ya'ari, 96, Israeli IDF general.

=== 28 ===
- Konrad Beikircher, 80, Italian-born German cabaret artist, musician and author.
- Roger Beilby, 79–80, Australian radio presenter (3CR Melbourne). (death announced on this date)
- Geraldine Bey, 91, American jazz singer and concert organizer (Chicago Jazz Festival).
- Kristina Carlson, 76, Finnish writer.
- Fred Doucette, 61, American politician, member of the New Hampshire House of Representatives (2014–2025).
- James Aren Duckett, 68, American convicted child murderer and sex offender, execution by lethal injection.
- Erwin Engeler, 96, Swiss mathematician (Omega-categorical theory).
- Pablo Garrido, 88, Mexican Olympic athlete (1968).
- Ghanaati, 20, American Thoroughbred racehorse.
- G. Thomas Goodnight, 77, American scholar and communication theorist.
- Godfrey Graham, 89, Irish cricketer (national team).
- Bobby Hunt, 85, American football player (Kansas City Chiefs, Cincinnati Bengals).
- Kavinsky, 50, French DJ, musician ("Nightcall", "Odd Look") and actor.
- Vassil Kazandjiev, 91, Bulgarian composer.
- Plinio Apuleyo Mendoza, 95, Colombian journalist and writer (Guide to the Perfect Latin American Idiot).
- Don Myers, 94, American politician, member of the Kansas House of Representatives (1993–2011).
- Joe Novak, 81, American college football player and coach (Northern Illinois Huskies).
- Sam Nusum, 82, Bermudian footballer (Montreal Olympique, New York Cosmos, national team).
- Dominick Occhicone, 80, American convicted murderer, execution by lethal injection.
- Benjamin Alire Sáenz, 71, American author (Aristotle and Dante Discover the Secrets of the Universe).
- Gopal Man Shrestha, 83, Nepali politician, minister of education (2017–2018), pancreatic cancer.
- Mike Smedley, 84, English cricketer (Nottinghamshire).
- Pavala Syamala, 74–75, Indian actress (Golimaar, Khadgam, Andhrawala), heart attack.
- Raoul Vaneigem, 92, Belgian writer (The Revolution of Everyday Life).
- Vedat Yenerer, 61, Turkish journalist and writer.
- Richard Yuille, 79, American judge.

=== 29 ===
- Ibrahim El-Attar, 98, Egyptian Olympic rower (1952).
- Jochen Bohl, 76, German Lutheran theologian, bishop of the Evangelical-Lutheran Church of Saxony (2004–2015).
- Cristino Centurión, 72, Argentine-born Paraguayan footballer (Club Guaraní, Deportes Tolima, Paraguay national team).
- Cairns Craig, 77, Scottish literary scholar.
- Simone Forti, 91, American postmodern dancer, choreographer and artist.
- Wiesław Grabowski, 70, Polish football coach (Zambia, Zimbabwe, national team).
- Lesley Grant-Adamson, 83, British writer and journalist.
- Gordon Green, 101, Australian footballer (North Melbourne).
- Brian Hamilton, 88, Irish Olympic fencer.
- Glen Hansard, 56, Irish musician (The Frames), songwriter ("Falling Slowly"), and actor (Once), Oscar winner (2008), traffic collision.
- Scott Hylands, 83, Canadian actor (Night Heat, Daddy's Gone A-Hunting, The Boys in Company C), acute myeloid leukemia.
- Jarosław Jechorek, 65, Polish basketball player (Lech Poznań, Śląsk Wrocław, national team), cancer.
- Alec Johnson, 82, English cricketer (Northumberland, Durham, Nottinghamshire).
- Francis Teke Lysinge, 87, Cameroonian Roman Catholic prelate, bishop of Mamfe (1999–2014).
- Don McDeed, 95, Australian rugby union player (Parramatta, Manly, national team).
- Harry Mitchell, 86, American politician, member of the U.S. House of Representatives (2007–2011).
- Khalid Nizami, 79, Pakistani actor (Ankahi, Uncle Urfi, Shehzori) and music composer.
- Erik Olssen, 84, New Zealand historian.
- Howard H. Pattee, 99, American biologist.
- Carol Lynn Pearson, 86, American poet, author and screenwriter (Cipher in the Snow), uterine cancer.
- Ferdousi Shahriar, 54, Bangladeshi diplomat.
- Raymond J. Smit, 97, American politician, member of the Michigan House of Representatives (1966–1974).
- Arlene Smith, 84, American singer (The Chantels).
- Billy Ray Smith Jr., 64, American Hall of Fame football player (Arkansas Razorbacks, San Diego Chargers), complications from dementia.
- Thaw Kaung, 88, Burmese librarian and historian.
- Tássio, 41, Brazilian footballer (Botafogo, Bragantino, CSKA Sofia), traumatic asphyxia.
- Gunnar Þórðarson, 81, Icelandic musician and songwriter.
- Hernando Tovar, 87, Colombian footballer (Santa Fe, national team).
- Zlatko Žagmešter, 83, Croatian handball player (RK Medveščak, RK Zagreb, Yugoslavia national team).

=== 30 ===
- Abubakar Alhaji, 89, Nigerian diplomat and politician, minister of finance (1990–1993).
- Geoffrey Arrand, 82, English Anglican priest, archdeacon of Suffolk (1994–2009).
- Eugene Benson, 98, Canadian writer, editor and librettist.
- Timoteo Hikmat Beylouni, 80, Syrian-born Venezuelan Syriac Catholic hierarch, apostolic exarch of Venezuela (since 2011).
- Beto Cabrera, 92, Argentine comedian and actor.
- Iga Cembrzyńska, 87, Polish actress (The Saragossa Manuscript, Salto, Hydrozagadka).
- Thea Dückert, 76, German politician, member of the Landtag of Lower Saxony (1986–1994) and the Bundestag (1998–2009).
- Ivan Edeshko, 81, Belarusian basketball player and coach, Olympic champion (1972).
- Johanna Fernández, 55, American historian, lung cancer.
- Myron Fink, 94, American opera composer.
- William Fuqua, 95, American judge, justice of the Kentucky Supreme Court (1995).
- Tadeusz Gapiński, 78, Polish footballer (ŁKS Łódź, Zawisza Bydgoszcz, Widzew Łódź).
- Walter Kammermann, 94, Swiss Olympic steeplechaser (1960).
- Sokrat Khanyan, 96, Armenian writer and poet.
- Magic Weisner, 27, American Thoroughbred racehorse.
- Donatille Mukabalisa, 66, Rwandan politician, senator (2011–2013 and since 2024), speaker (2013–2024) and twice member of the Chamber of Deputies.
- James Munkres, 95, American mathematician.
- Kazimira Prunskienė, 83, Lithuanian politician, prime minister (1990–1991), MP (1996–2008), and minister of agriculture (2004–2008).
- K. Jamuna Rani, 88, Indian playback singer (Valayapathi, Gulebakavali, Seda Sulang).
- Honorio Rúa, 91, Colombian Olympic track cyclist (1956).
- Seppo Sairanen, 74, Finnish football player (Ässät, national team) and manager (FC Jazz).
- Keith N. Schoville, 98, American academic.
- Manolo Solo, 62, Spanish actor (The Fury of a Patient Man, Close Your Eyes, Pan's Labyrinth), cancer.
- Hassie van Wijk, 87, Dutch football player (De Volewijckers, Telstar, AZ '67) and manager.
- Marģers Vestermanis, 100, Latvian Holocaust survivor and historian, co-founder of Jews in Latvia.
- Notable victims of the Broad Peak avalanche:
  - Pur Bahadur Gurung, 37, Nepalese mountaineer and expedition guide
  - Nadhira Al Harthy, 48, Omani civil servant and mountaineer
  - Kili Pemba Sherpa, 45–46, Nepalese mountaineer
  - Nirmal Purja, 43, Nepalese-British mountaineer

=== 31 ===
- Glenn A. Baker, 74, Australian rock music journalist (Billboard), commentator and broadcaster, complications from a stroke.
- Franco Baresi, 66, Italian footballer (AC Milan, national team), world champion (1982).
- Norris Brown, 65, American football player (Minnesota Vikings, New Jersey Generals, Jacksonville Bulls).
- Jakob Butturff, 32, American ten-pin bowler, heart attack.
- Cyanide, 31, Finnish esports player (League of Legends).
- Sir John Garnier, 92, British navy officer.
- Ben Hanuschak, 96, Canadian politician, Manitoba MLA (1966–1981).
- Henry Herford, 79, Scottish baritone singer.
- Jerney Kaagman, 79, Dutch singer (Earth and Fire), complications from Parkinson's disease.
- Orris E. Kelly, 100, American army officer, chief of chaplains (1975–1979).
- Todd Lewis, 65, Canadian politician, senator (since 2025).
- Dragiša Milojković, 55, Serbian actor.
- Michela Monari, 53, Italian volleyball player (national team).
- Alexei Murygin, 39, Russian ice hockey player (Amur Khabarovsk, Torpedo Nizhny Novgorod).
- Phon Paradraksa, 103, Thai police lieutenant general (Royal Thai Police).
- Kailash Chandra Pant, 90, Indian writer and journalist, cardiac arrest.
- Vishwa Nath Sharma, 96, Indian military officer, chief of the army staff (1988–1990).
- Harry D. Train II, 98, American admiral, commander-in-chief of the U.S. Sixth Fleet (1976–1978) and the U.S. Atlantic Fleet (1978–1982).
- Luis Uruñuela, 89, Spanish politician, deputy (1979), mayor of Seville (1979–1983).
- Pepe Villalobos, 96, Peruvian musician and composer.
- Vicki Wickham, 87, English talent manager and television producer (Ready Steady Go!), complications from Lewy body dementia.
