= Ravitch =

Ravitch is a surname:

- Diane Ravitch (born 1938), historian of education, educational policy analyst, and professor
- Richard Ravitch (1933–2023), American politician, businessman, and former Lieutenant Governor of New York
- Norman Ravitch, professor emeritus of history at University of California, Riverside
- Melech Ravitch (1893–1976), pen name of Zechariah Choneh Bergner, Canadian Yiddish writer
