= Gennady Russkikh =

Russian politician (1944–2026)

- Геннадий Русских

Member of the Legislative Assembly of Kirov Oblast
- In office 1997–2017

Personal details
- Born: 9 September 1944 Skryabintsy, Falyonsky District, Kirov Oblast, Russian SFSR, USSR
- Died: 12 July 2026 (aged 81)
- Profession: Politician

Gennady Alexandrovich Russkikh (Russian: Геннадий Александрович Русских; 9 September 1944 – 12 July 2026) was a Russian politician who was a member of the Legislative Assembly of Kirov Oblast (1997–2017).

Russkikh died on 12 July 2026, at the age of 81.
