= Odile Sicard =

French politician (1930–2026)

Deputy of the French National Assembly
- In office 2 July 1981 – 14 May 1988
- Preceded by: Guy-Pierre Cabanel
- Succeeded by: Alain Carignon
- Constituency: Isère's 1st constituency (1981–1986) proportional representation (1986–1988)

Personal details
- Born: 25 August 1930 Broc, France
- Died: 24 July 2026 (aged 95)
- Party: PS
- Education: University of Paris Faculty of Law; Grenoble Alpes University
- Occupation: Social worker

Odile Sicard (French: [odˈil sikˈaʁ]; 25 August 1930 – 24 July 2026) was a French politician of the Socialist Party (PS).

A graduate of the University of Paris Faculty of Law and Grenoble Alpes University, she worked as a social worker before serving as a deputy in the National Assembly from 1981 to 1988.

Sicard died on 24 July 2026, at the age of 95.
