= Paul Fogelberg =

Finnish academic (1935–2026)

- Born: Paul Erik Fogelberg; 26 August 1935; Pori, Finland
- Died: 25 July 2026 (aged 90); Vantaa, Finland
- Works: Professor of Geography (1982–1998); Vice-Rector (1992–1998)
- Awards: State Award for Public Information (1975); Commander of the Order of the Lion of Finland; Knight 1st Class of the Order of the White Rose of Finland

Academic background
- Education: University of Helsinki (PhD, 1970)

Paul Erik Fogelberg (26 August 1935 – 25 July 2026) was a Finnish geographer and professor of geography in University of Finland. He served as the professor of geography from 1982 to 1998 and as vice rector of the university from 1992 to 1998.

== Life and career ==
Paul Erik Fogelberg was born on 26 August 1935 in Pori. He studied secondary school at Svenska samskolan i Tammerfors. He graduated in mathematics in 1953. He studied more at the University of Helsinki to pursue higher education in geography. He completed his Bachelor of Arts in 1962 and Master of Arts in 1964. He earned his Licentiate of Philosophy in 1966 before getting doctoral studies in 1970.

He started his academic career in University of Helsinki. In 1975, he was awarded the State Award for Public Information alongside Stig Jaatinen and Henrik Österholm for their collaborative work Skärgård i omvandling. He was elected as a member of the Finnish Society of Sciences and Letters in 1982. He served as an editor of its publication series Bidrag till kännedom av Finlands natur och folk. They honored him with its Silver Medal in 2008. He was decorated with Order of the Lion of Finland, a Knight 1st Class of the Order of the White Rose of Finland, and the State Decoration of Merit.

Fogelberg died in Vantaa on 25 July 2026, at the age of 90.
