= Azriel Blackman =

American airline mechanic (1925–2026)

- Born: August 30, 1925; Manhattan, New York, U.S.
- Died: July 24, 2026 (aged 100); Queens, New York, U.S.
- Occupation: Airline mechanic

Azriel Blackman (August 30, 1925 – July 24, 2026) was an American airline mechanic.

== Life and career ==
Blackman was born in Manhattan, New York, the son of Aaron Blackman, a Russian-American tailor, and Mary Goldberg. He attended Aviation High School, graduating in 1942. After graduating, he worked as an apprentice mechanic at the American Export Airlines. He enlisted in the United States Army during the Korean War. During his military service, he repaired helicopters for the Mobile Army Surgical Hospital. He was discharged in 1952.

Blackman served as crew chief at Idlewind Airport in 1960, and for eighty years, he worked as a plane mechanic at American Airlines. In 2017, Guinness World Records listed him as "having the longest career as an airline mechanic". He retired in 2022.

== Death ==
Blackman died at a nursing home in Queens, New York on July 24, 2026, at the age of 100.
