= Hirokazu Mizuta =

Japanese business executive (1937–2026)

- 水田 寛和

President of Tokyu Department Store
- In office 2000–2008
- Preceded by: Toru Uchiyama
- Succeeded by: Etsuro Ishizuya

Personal details
- Born: November 9, 1937 Oita Prefecture, Japan
- Died: July 25, 2026 (aged 88) Japan
- Education: Keio University
- Occupation: Business executive

Hirokazu Mizuta (Japanese: 水田 廣和; November 9, 1937 – July 25, 2026) was a Japanese business executive. He served as the president and chairman of Tokyu Department Store.

== Life and career ==
Hirokazu Mizuta was born in Oita Prefecture on November 9, 1937. He graduated from the Faculty of Law, Department of Political Science at Keio University in 1962 and joined Tokyu Railways. He became the director of Tokyu Department Store in 1995. He became the managing director in 1996, senior managing director in 1998, and president in 2000, succeeding Toru Uchiyama. During his term, he launched the "Business Revolution Plan," a long term strategy in major urban shopping hubs such as Shibuya.

Mizuta died on July 25, 2026, at the age of 88.
