= Ekaterina Verzilina =

Russian farming leader (1929–2026)

- Екатерина Верзилина
- Born: 5 December 1929; Ilyich, Dobrinsky District, Central Black Earth Oblast, Russian SFSR, Soviet Union
- Died: 25 July 2026 (aged 96)
- Occupation: Farm leader
- Employer: Ilyich Collective Farm
- Known for: Sugar beet farming
- Awards: Order of Lenin

Ekaterina Sergeyevna Verzilina (Russian: Екатерина Сергеевна Верзилина; 5 December 1929 – 25 July 2026) was a Russian farming leader and supervisor for the Ilyich Collective Farm in the Dobrinsky District, Central Black Earth Oblast. She was awarded the title of Hero of Socialist Labour in 1973.

== Early life and career ==
Ekaterina Sergeyevna Verzilina was born on 5 December 1929, in Ilyich, Dobrinsky District, Lipetsk Oblast, into a family of communards. She completed seven years of education and began working at the age of 15 in 1944 on the Ilyich collective farm.

In the late 1950s, Verzilina was appointed the team leader of a sugar beet-growing brigade. Each year, the team, led by her, harvested approximately 400 centners of sugar beets per hectare. In 1971, she was awarded the Order of Lenin and in 1973, she was awarded the Hero of Socialist Labour. In 1973, its team produced an average of 506 centners of sugar beet per hectare, which is the most sugar beet collected since.

== Death ==
Verzilina died on 25 July 2026, at the age of 96.
