= Nikolay Ryabushenko =

Russian politician (1962–2026)

- Николай Рябушенко

Member of the Altai Krai Legislative Assembly
- In office 14 March 2004 – 2 March 2008

Personal details
- Born: 1 January 1962 Ozyornoye, Kulundinsky District, Altai Krai, Russian SFSR, USSR
- Died: 19 July 2026 (aged 64)
- Party: United Russia
- Education: Siberian State Automobile and Highway University
- Profession: Politician

Nikolay Alexandrovich Ryabushenko (Russian: Николай Александрович Рябушенко; 1 January 1962 – 19 July 2026) was a Russian politician who was a member of the Altai Krai Legislative Assembly (2004–2008).

Ryabushenko died on 19 July 2026, at the age of 64.
