= Oleg Bolotin =

Russian politician (1938–2026)

- Олег Болотин

Member of the Volgograd Oblast Duma
- In office December 1998 – April 2009

Personal details
- Born: 14 December 1938 Stalingrad, Russian SFSR, USSR
- Died: 23 July 2026 (aged 87) Volgograd, Russia
- Party: A Just Russia
- Education: Volgograd State Technical University
- Profession: Politician

Oleg Georgievich Bolotin (Russian: Олег Георгиевич Болотин; 14 December 1938 – 23 July 2026) was a Russian politician who was a member of the Volgograd Oblast Duma (1998–2009).

Bolotin died in Volgograd on 23 July 2026, at the age of 87.
