= Ronny Woodruff =

American biologist and zoologist (1943–2026)

- Born: Ronny Clifford Woodruff; March 12, 1943; Greenville, Texas, U.S.
- Died: July 25, 2026 (aged 83)
- Education: East Texas State University; Utah State University
- Occupations: Biologist, zoologist
- Spouse: Susan Elizabeth Barker

Ronny Clifford Woodruff (March 12, 1943 – July 25, 2026) was an American biologist and zoologist.

== Early life and career ==
Woodruff was born in Greenville, Texas, and was raised in Hughes Springs, Texas. He attended East Texas State University, earning his BS degrees in biology and English in 1966, and his MS degree in zoology in 1967. He also attended Utah State University, earning his PhD degree in 1972.

Woodruff served as an assistant professor in the department of zoology at the University of Texas at Austin from 1973 to 1974. He then served as a professor in the department of biological sciences at Bowling Green State University from 1977 to 2021. During his years as a professor, in 1994, he was named a distinguished research professor, and in 2010, he was named a fellow of the American Association for the Advancement of Science.

== Personal life and death ==
Woodruff was married to Susan Elizabeth Barker. Their marriage lasted until Woodruff's death in 2026.

Woodruff died on July 25, 2026, at the age of 83.
