= Zdzisław Maszkiewicz =

Polish politician (1950–2026)

Member of the Senate of Poland
- In office 20 October 1997 – 18 October 2001

Personal details
- Born: 28 November 1950 Garwolin, Poland
- Died: 26 July 2026 (aged 75)
- Party: AWS
- Occupation: Electronics technician

Zdzisław Maszkiewicz (28 November 1950 – 26 July 2026) was a Polish politician. A member of Solidarity Electoral Action, he served in the Senate from 1997 to 2001.

Maszkiewicz died on 26 July 2026, at the age of 75.
