= Gianni Cazzola =

Italian jazz drummer (1938–2026)

Gianni Cazzola (9 May 1938 – 18 July 2026) was an Italian jazz drummer.

On the evening of 18 July 2026, Cazzola fell ill from a suspected heart attack while playing drums at the Gemia Swing Club in Busto Arsizio. He died in hospital shortly afterwards, at the age of 88.
