= Lu Shichen =

Chinese economist (1948–2026)

- 卢世琛

Member of the National Committee of the Chinese People's Political Consultative Conference
- In office 2003–2018

Personal details
- Born: 1948 Haiyan County, Zhejiang, Zhejiang, China
- Died: 26 July 2026 (aged 78) Beijing, China
- Education: Chinese Academy of Social Sciences
- Profession: Economist, editor, researcher

Lu Shichen (Chinese: 卢世琛; pinyin: Lú Shìchēn; 1948 – 26 July 2026) was a Chinese economist, researcher and editor. Lu taught at the Chinese Academy of Social Sciences. He served as a member of the National Committee of the Chinese People's Political Consultative Conference from 2003 to 2018.

== Life and career ==
Lu Shichen was born in 1948, in Haiyan County, Zhejiang. He was the son of Lu Zongcheng, a communication expert. He graduated in economics and later joined the Chinese Academy of Social Sciences.

He began his career at the Chinese Academy of Social Sciences. He became a teacher and researcher in telecommunications and politics. He served three terms as the National Committee of the Chinese People's Political Consultative Conference from 2003 to 2018. He represented the News and Publishing sector in the 10th, 11th, and 12th national assemblies.

Lu died in Beijing on 26 July 2026, at the age of 78.
