= Albert Mamy =

French politician (1939–2026)

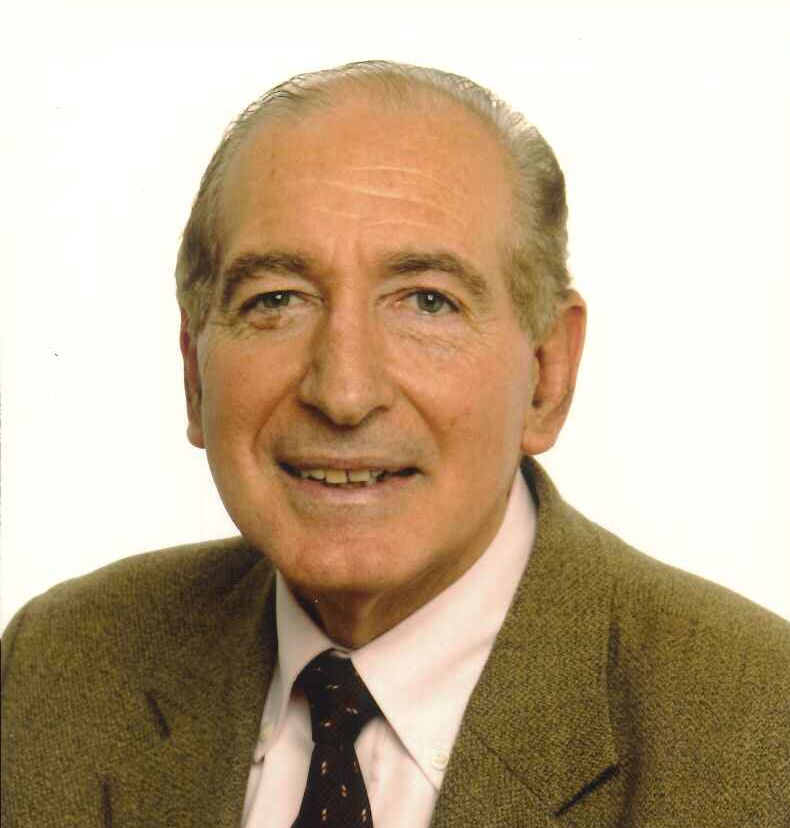

Deputy of the French National Assembly for Tarn
- In office 2 April 1986 – 14 May 1988

Mayor of Sorèze
- In office 20 March 1977 – 23 May 2020
- Preceded by: Georges de Léotoing
- Succeeded by: Marie-Lise Housseau

Member of the General Council of Tarn
- In office 15 March 1970 – 18 March 1982
- Preceded by: François Monsarrat
- Succeeded by: Georges Mazars
- Constituency: Canton of Dourgne

Personal details
- Born: 14 August 1939 Toulouse, France
- Died: 10 July 2026 (aged 86)
- Party: UDF; PR; UMP; LR
- Education: Toulouse School of Law
- Occupation: Lawyer

Albert Mamy (French: [albˈɛʁ mˈe͡ɪmi]; 14 August 1939 – 10 July 2026) was a French politician.

A lawyer by profession and a graduate of the Toulouse School of Law, he also wrote two books, including one on the history of Sorèze. There, he served as mayor from 1977 to 2020. He was also a member of the General Council of Tarn from 1970 to 1982 and a deputy of the National Assembly from 1986 to 1988.

Mamy died on 10 July 2026, at the age of 86.
