= Albert Sous =

German sculptor and goldsmith (1935–2026)

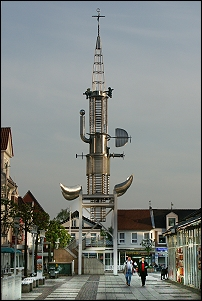
- The Sous-Turm in Aurich
- Born: 24 April 1935; Stolberg, Gau Cologne-Aachen, Germany
- Died: 4 July 2026 (aged 91)
- Education: Werkkunstschule Aachen
- Occupations: Sculptor, goldsmith

Albert Sous (24 April 1935 – 4 July 2026) was a German sculptor and goldsmith.

After training as a goldsmith from 1953 to 1956 and his studies at the Werkkunstschule Aachen from 1956 to 1960, he created several sculptures and monuments in Aachen, as well as in Mainz.

Sous died on 4 July 2026, at the age of 91.
