= Georg Ferstl =

Austrian politician (1936–2026)

Member of the Landtag of Styria
- In office 7 November 2000 – 24 October 2005

Personal details
- Born: 30 December 1936 Trofaiach, Styria, Austria
- Died: 13 July 2026 (aged 89)
- Party: FPÖ
- Occupation: Restauranteur

Georg Ferstl (30 December 1936 – 13 July 2026) was an Austrian politician. A member of the Freedom Party, he served in the Landtag of Styria from 2000 to 2005.

Ferstl died on 13 July 2026, at the age of 89.
