= Kim Hyeong-gwang =

South Korean politician (1935–2026)

- 김형광

Member of the National Assembly of South Korea
- In office 11 April 1985 – 29 May 1988
- In office 17 March 1979 – 17 May 1980

Personal details
- Born: 12 May 1935 Dongducheon, Korea, Empire of Japan
- Died: 21 July 2026 (aged 91)
- Party: NDP; NKDP
- Education: University of Missouri (BA)
- Occupation: Lecturer

Kim Hyeong-gwang (Korean: 김형광; 12 May 1935 – 21 July 2026) was a South Korean politician. A member of the New Democratic Party and the New Korean Democratic Party, he served in the National Assembly from 1979 to 1980 and again from 1985 to 1988.

Kim died on 21 July 2026, at the age of 91.
