= Alberto Lettieri =

Argentine historian and academic (1959–2026)

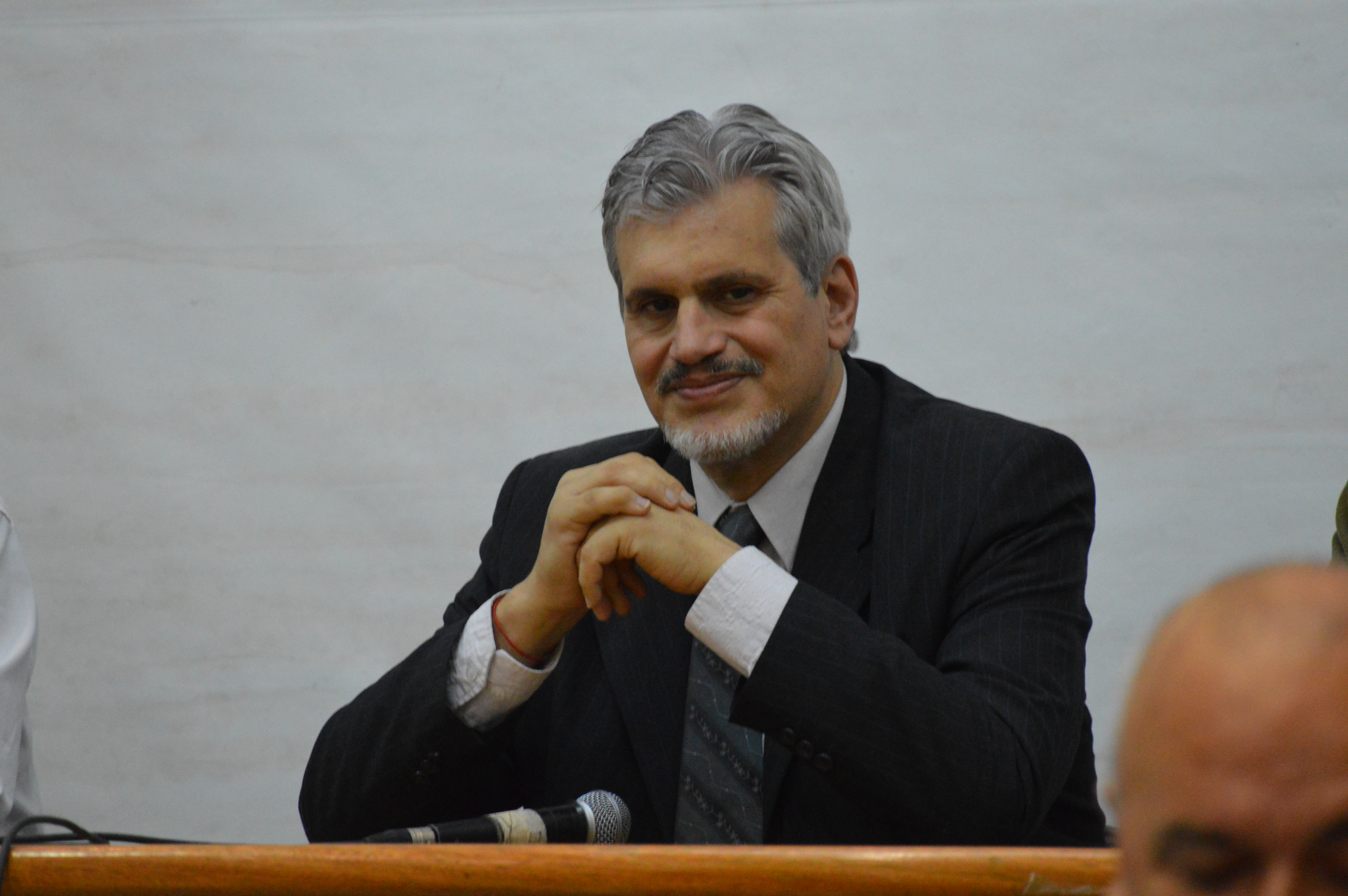
- Lettieri in 2016
- Born: Alberto Rodolfo Lettieri; 20 May 1959; Buenos Aires, Argentina
- Died: 6 July 2026 (aged 67); Villars, Buenos Aires Province, Argentina
- Education: Faculty of Philosophy and Letters, University of Buenos Aires
- Occupations: Historian, academic

Alberto Rodolfo Lettieri (20 May 1959 – 6 July 2026) was an Argentine historian and academic.

A graduate of the Faculty of Philosophy and Letters, University of Buenos Aires, he taught at his alma mater and conducted research for the National Scientific and Technical Research Council. He also made several appearances as a host and editorialist for television and radio programs.

Lettieri died of complications from diabetes in Villars, on 6 July 2026, at the age of 67.

== Publications ==
- Vicente Fidel López. La construcción histórica de un liberalismo conservador (1995)
- Historia contemporánea. De la revolución inglesa a la actualidad (1999)
- La República de las Instituciones. Proyecto, desarrollo y crisis del régimen político liberal en la Argentina en tiempos de la organización nacional (2000)
- Los tiempos modernos (2001)
- La república de la opinión. Política y opinión pública en Buenos Aires entre 1852 y 1862 (1999)
- La vida política en la Argentina del siglo XIX. Armas, votos y voces (2003)
- La civilización en debate. Historia contemporánea: de las revoluciones burguesas al neoliberalismo (2003)
- Seis lecciones de política (2004)
- Discutir el presente. Imaginar el futuro (la problematica del mundo actual) (2005)
- Construcción de la República de la Opinión. Buenos Aires frente al Interior de 1850 (2006)
- Problemática del mundo actual. Globalización y capitalismo (2007)
- La historia argentina en clave nacional, federalista y popular (2013)
- La batalla cultural y la mirada de la historia (2014)
