= José Ignacio Ascasibar Zarrao =

Spanish cyclist (1943–2026)

Personal information
- Born: 28 November 1943 Elgeta, Spain
- Died: 25 July 2026 (aged 82) Barakaldo, Spain

Cycling career
- Sport: Cycling
- Discipline: Road
- Role: Cycling

Professional teams
- 1965–1969: GAC - Mobylette
- 1969: La Casera
- 1969–1970: La Casera–Peña Bahamontes
- 1971: FC Porto–Antracol

José Ignacio Ascasibar Zarrao (28 November 1943 – 25 July 2026) was a Spanish professional road cyclist who competed from 1969 and 1971. He rode for many teams, including La Casera–Peña Bahamontes and FC Porto, achieving notable results such as the second-place finish at the Vuelta a Cantabria and top-20 finishes at the Vuelta a Andalucía and GP Navarra. Ascasibar Zarrao died on 25 July 2026, at the age of 82.
