= Winfried Schittges =

German politician (1946–2026)

Member of the Landtag of North Rhine-Westphalia
- In office 31 May 1990 – 31 May 2017
- Constituency: proportional representation (1990–1995, 2012–2017); Krefeld II (1995–2012)

Personal details
- Born: 26 September 1946 Krefeld, North Rhine-Westphalia, Allied-occupied Germany
- Died: 19 July 2026 (aged 79)
- Party: CDU
- Education: University of Bonn
- Occupation: Business consultant

Winfried Schittges (26 September 1946 – 19 July 2026) was a German politician. A member of the Christian Democratic Union, he served in the Landtag of North Rhine-Westphalia from 1990 to 2017.

Schittges died on 19 July 2026, at the age of 79.
