= Jordi Borja Sebastià =

Spanish politician (1941–2026)

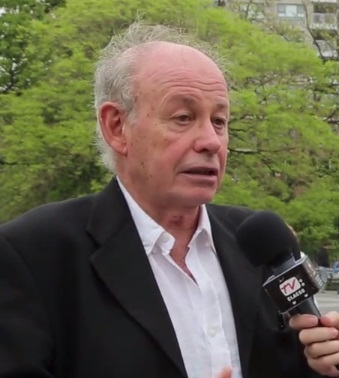
- Borja in 2014

Member of the Parliament of Catalonia for Barcelona
- In office 10 April 1980 – 20 March 1984

Personal details
- Born: 18 June 1941 Barcelona, Spain
- Died: 10 July 2026 (aged 85) Barcelona, Spain
- Party: PSUC
- Education: University of Barcelona (Lic.); University of Paris
- Occupation: Geographer

Jordi Borja Sebastià (18 June 1941 – 10 July 2026) was a Spanish academic, geographer, and politician. A member of the Unified Socialist Party of Catalonia, he served in the Parliament of Catalonia from 1980 to 1984.

Borja died in Barcelona on 10 July 2026, at the age of 85.
