= Laura Spector (vine artist) =

American vine artist

- Born: Laura Fay Reitman; July 28, 1954; Long Island, New York, U.S.
- Died: July 25, 2026 (aged 71); Fairfield, Connecticut, U.S.
- Education: Bennington College; New York University
- Occupation: Vine artist
- Spouse: Mark Spector (m. 1987)
- Children: 2

Laura Fay Reitman (July 28, 1954 – July 25, 2026) was an American vine artist.

== Early life and career ==
Spector was born in Long Island, New York, the son of Morton Reitman, a textile executive, and Georgette Lieberman, a Holocaust survivor. She studied dancing at Bennington College and New York University. She worked as a marketing consultant, and worked at A&M Records.

As a vine artist, Spector created vine furniture, and vine pieces for musicians Joan Baez and Sting. She collected tangled vines in Connecticut, and according to The New York Times, her red hair was referred as "the twisting tower of hair is of Amy Winehouse heft and trajectory" in 2008.

== Personal life and death ==
Spector married Mark in 1987. They had two children. Their marriage lasted until Spector's death in 2026.

Spector died at her home in Fairfield, Connecticut on July 25, 2026, at the age of 71.
