= Fouzia Habib =

Pakistani politician (died 2026)

- فوزیہ حبیب

Member of the National Assembly of Pakistan
- In office 2008–2013

Personal details
- Died: July 2026
- Party: Pakistan People's Party (PPP)

Fouzia Habib (Urdu: فوزیہ حبیب; died July 2026) was a Pakistani politician who served as member of the National Assembly of Pakistan.

== Life and career ==
Habib was elected to the National Assembly of Pakistan as a candidate of Pakistan People's Party on a seat reserved for women in the 2002 Pakistani general election.

She was elected to the National Assembly of Pakistan from Punjab as a candidate of Pakistan People's Party on a seat reserved for women in the 2008 Pakistani general election.

Habib died in July 2026.
