= Yuri Karlikanov =

Russian politician (1951–2026)

- Юрий Карликанов

Member of the Legislative Assembly of Chelyabinsk Oblast
- In office 18 April 2005 – September 2025

Personal details
- Born: 22 August 1951 Verkhneuralsk, Chelyabinsk Oblast, Russian SFSR, USSR
- Died: 9 July 2026 (aged 74) Chelyabinsk, Russia
- Party: United Russia
- Education: South Ural State University
- Profession: Politician

Yuri Raifovich Karlikanov (Russian: Юрий Раифович Карликанов; 22 August 1951 — 9 July 2026) was a Russian politician who was a member (2005–2025) and deputy speaker (2020–2025) of the Legislative Assembly of Chelyabinsk Oblast.

Karlikanov died in Chelyabinsk on 9 July 2026, at the age of 74.
