= John Ripard =

Maltese sailor (1929–2026)

John Charles Ripard (7 March 1929 – 1 July 2026) was a Maltese sailor who competed in the 1960 Summer Olympics. He was also the honorary President of the Royal Malta Yacht Club and one of the Co-founders of the Rolex Middle Sea Race.

Ripard was born in Sliema, Malta on 7 March 1929, and died on 1 July 2026, aged 97.
