= Robert B. Pickering =

American anthropologist (died 2026)

- Born: Robert Bruce Pickering
- Died: July 1, 2026
- Occupations: Anthropologist academic administrator
- Known for: Ida McFarlin Dean of the McFarlin Library

Academic work
- Discipline: Anthropology
- Institutions: University of Tulsa

Robert B. Pickering was an American anthropologist, museum educator, and academic administrator. He was a professor of anthropology at the University of Tulsa and was the Ida McFarlin Dean of the McFarlin Library.

He died on July 1, 2026.
