= Sumarjati Arjoso =

Indonesian politician (1946–2026)

Member of the House of Representatives of Indonesia for Central Java III
- In office 2 October 2018 – 30 September 2019
- In office 1 October 2009 – 30 September 2014

Personal details
- Born: 29 May 1946 Yogyakarta, Dutch East Indies
- Died: 24 July 2026 (aged 80)
- Party: Gerindra
- Education: Gadjah Mada University; University of Indonesia

Sumarjati Arjoso (29 May 1946 – 24 July 2026) was an Indonesian politician. A member of the Gerindra Party, she served in the House of Representatives from 2009 to 2014 and again from 2018 to 2019.

Arjoso died on 24 July 2026, at the age of 80.
