= James R. Urbaniak =

American orthopedic surgeon (1936–2026)

James Randolph Urbaniak (May 15, 1936 – July 18, 2026) was an American orthopedic surgeon. He was a pioneer in the practice of replantation of amputated body parts.

== Biography ==
Urbaniak was born in Fairmont, West Virginia. His father was a Polish immigrant and worked as a coal miner who later was a district president of the United Mine Workers of America and his mother was a homemaker. He was named all-state in football and was class valedictorian at Fairmont Senior High School. He was recruited by Bear Bryant to play football at the University of Kentucky, where his father also played. For his senior season in 1957, he was one of the top four receivers in the Southeastern Conference.

Urbaniak died in Durham, North Carolina on July 18, 2026, at the age of 90.
