= Peter von Möllendorff =

German classical philologist (1963–2026)

- Born: 5 April 1963; Zurich, Switzerland
- Died: 10 July 2026 (aged 63)
- Education: University of Cologne; University of Freiburg; LMU Munich
- Occupation: Classical philologist

Peter von Möllendorff (5 April 1963 – 10 July 2026) was a German classical philologist.

Von Möllendorff notably served as chair of the Classical Philology Department at the University of Giessen from 2003 until his death.

Von Möllendorff died on 10 July 2026, at the age of 63.
