= Jean-Pierre Tagliaferri =

French film actor (1948–2026)

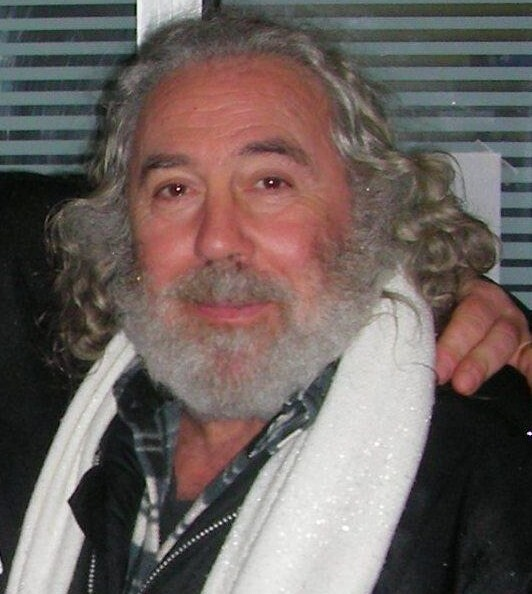
- Tagliaferri in 2010
- Born: 27 September 1948; 13th arrondissement of Paris, France
- Died: 2 July 2026 (aged 77)
- Occupation: Film actor

Jean-Pierre Tagliaferri (27 September 1948 – 2 July 2026) was a French film actor. He was best known for playing Monsieur Masson in the 2003 film Seven Years of Marriage.

Tagliaferri died on 2 July 2026, at the age of 77.
