= Vibert Cornwall =

Vincentian jazz singer (1938–2026)

- Cornwall in 2010 receives honorary Doctor of Letters from Coventry University
- Born: 27 October 1938
- Died: 20 July 2026 (aged 87)
- Other name: Ray King

Vibert Edmund Cornwall (27 October 1938 – 20 July 2026), known professionally as Ray King, was a Vincentian jazz singer.

== Life and career ==
Vibert Cornwall was born on 27 October 1938. He migrated to Coventry, England as a teenager from Saint Vincent and the Grenadines. Vibert began singing in clubs across Coventry in 1966. It was around this time that Vibert adopted the stage name 'Ray King' after joining the band 'Suzi and the Kingsize Kings', at which point the band was renamed 'The Ray King Soul Band'.

He was known for being a formative influence on the 2-Tone movement, which originated in Coventry during the late 1970s and early 1980s. He was a passionate supporter of the city's West Indian and black ethnic communities and received an honorary doctorate of letters from Coventry University on 23 November 2010 in recognition of his volunteering and altruistic efforts. In 2012, he was honoured with a plaque on the Wall of Fame at 2 Tone village, part of the Coventry Music Museum.

Cornwall died on 20 July 2026, at the age of 87.
