= Walther Graetsch =

German politician (1953–2026)

Member of the Landtag of Lower Saxony
- In office 18 January 1984 – 20 June 1990
- Preceded by: Heinrich Jürgens

Personal details
- Born: 17 April 1953 Sandhorst, Lower Saxony, West Germany
- Died: 2 July 2026 (aged 73)
- Party: FDP
- Occupation: Civil servant

Walther Graetsch (17 April 1953 – 2 July 2026) was a German politician. A member of the Free Democratic Party, he served in the Landtag of Lower Saxony from 1984 to 1990.

Graetsch died on 2 July 2026, at the age of 73.
