= Randolph Thummel =

American chemist (1945–2026)

Randolph P. Thummel (September 20, 1945 – July 15, 2026) was an American chemist who specialized in organic and inorganic chemistry, and was latterly the John and Rebecca Moores Professor at the University of Houston. He was born in New York City on September 20, 1945 and raised in Montclair, New Jersey. Thummel died in Houston, Texas, on July 15, 2026, at the age of 80.
