= André Romus =

Belgian painter and television director (1936–2026)

- Born: 27 November 1936; Theux, Belgium
- Died: 1 July 2026 (aged 89); Liège, Belgium
- Education: University of Liège (Lic.)
- Occupations: Painter, television director

André Romus (27 November 1936 – 1 July 2026) was a Belgian painter and television director.

A licentiate holder in philosophy and letters, his paintings were influenced by the works of Pierre Soulages. Also working in television, he directed biographical documentaries for RTBF.

Romus died in Liège on 1 July 2026, at the age of 89.
