= Dragiša Milojković =

Serbian actor and television host (1971–2026)

- Драгиша Милојковић
- Born: 12 May 1971; Svetozarevo, SR Serbia, SFR Yugoslavia
- Died: 31 July 2026 (aged 55); Kragujevac, Serbia
- Occupation: Actor

Dragiša Milojković (Serbian Cyrillic: Драгиша Милојковић; 12 May 1971 – 31 July 2026) was a Serbian film and television actor.

== Life and career ==
Milojković graduated in acting from the academy in Novi Sad, in the class of professor Petar Banićević. He was a member of the Belgrade Drama Theatre. He wrote the book Me, My Father, which was published in 2008.

Milojković died in Kragujevac on 31 July 2026, at the age of 55.
