= Cid Saboia de Carvalho =

Brazilian politician (1935–2026)

Member of the Federal Senate of Brazil
- In office 1 February 1987 – 31 January 1995

Personal details
- Born: 25 August 1935 Fortaleza, Ceará, Brazil
- Died: 10 July 2026 (aged 90) Fortaleza, Ceará, Brazil
- Party: PMDB
- Education: Federal University of Ceará
- Occupation: Lawyer

Cid Saboia de Carvalho (25 August 1935 – 10 July 2026) was a Brazilian politician. A member of the Brazilian Democratic Movement Party, he served in the Federal Senate from 1987 to 1995.

Carvalho died in Fortaleza on 10 July 2026, at the age of 90.
