= Boris Chudetsky =

Russian politician (1947–2026)

- Борис Чудецкий

Member of the Congress of People's Deputies of Russia
- In office 16 May 1990 – 21 September 1993

Personal details
- Born: Boris Nikolaevich Chudetsky; 8 November 1947 Puchezh, Ivanovo Oblast, Russian SFSR, Soviet Union
- Died: 5 July 2026 (aged 78)
- Party: Radical Democrats
- Education: Kostroma State Technological Institute
- Occupation: Miller

Boris Nikolaevich Chudetsky (Russian: Борис Николаевич Чудецкий; 8 November 1947 – 5 July 2026) was a Russian politician. A member of the Radical Democrats, he served in the Congress of People's Deputies from 1990 to 1993.

Chudetsky died on 5 July 2026, at the age of 78.
