= Lee Yeon-suk =

South Korean politician (1935–2026)

- 이연숙

Member of the National Assembly of South Korea
- In office 30 May 2000 – 29 May 2004

Personal details
- Born: 11 December 1935 Hwacheon County, Korea, Japan
- Died: 9 July 2026 (aged 90)
- Party: GNP
- Education: Ewha Womans University

Lee Yeon-suk (Korean: 이연숙; 11 December 1935 – 9 July 2026) was a South Korean politician. A member of the Grand National Party, she served in the National Assembly from 2000 to 2004.

Lee died on 9 July 2026, at the age of 90.
