= Jun Isezaki =

Japanese ceramic artist and potter (1936–2026)

- 伊勢崎淳
- Born: 20 February 1936; Bizen, Japan
- Died: 11 July 2026 (aged 90); Okayama, Japan
- Education: Okayama University
- Occupations: Ceramic artist Potter

Jun Isezaki (Japanese: 伊勢崎淳 Isezaki Jun; 20 February 1936 – 11 July 2026) was a Japanese ceramic artist and potter.

A graduate of Okayama University, his works ranged from traditional tea ceramics to modern sculptures. In 2004, he was designated a National Treasure for his works.

Isezaki died on 11 July 2026, at the age of 90.
