= Danuta Grabowska =

Polish politician (1942–2026)

Member of the Sejm
- In office 18 June 1989 – 24 November 1991
- In office 14 October 1993 – 18 October 2005

Personal details
- Born: Danuta Maria Grabowska; 16 July 1942 Radom, General Government
- Died: 2 July 2026 (aged 83) Radom, Poland
- Party: PZPR; SLD
- Education: UMCS
- Occupation: Teacher

Danuta Maria Grabowska (16 July 1942 – 2 July 2026) was a Polish politician. A member of the Polish United Workers' Party and the Democratic Left Alliance, she served in the Sejm from 1989 to 1991 and again from 1993 to 2005.

Grabowska died in Radom on 2 July 2026, at the age of 83.
