= Marie-Madeleine Dieulangard =

French politician (1936–2026)

Member of the French Senate for Loire-Atlantique
- In office 27 September 1992 – 30 September 2001

Deputy of the French National Assembly for Loire-Atlantique's 8th constituency
- In office 29 July 1988 – 9 August 1991
- Preceded by: Claude Évin
- Succeeded by: Claude Évin

Personal details
- Born: 19 July 1936 Saint-Nazaire, France
- Died: 2 July 2026 (aged 89)
- Party: PS
- Occupation: Secretary

Marie-Madeleine Dieulangard (French: [maʁˈi-madlˈɛn djølɑ̃ɡˈaʁ]; 19 July 1936 – 2 July 2026) was a French politician of the Socialist Party (PS).

Dieulangard joined the National Assembly after Claude Évin was appointed Minister of Social Affairs and Solidarity. From 1992 to 2001, she served in the Senate.

Dieulangard died on 2 July 2026, at the age of 89.
