= Françoise Coquet =

French television producer and screenwriter (1942–2026)

- Born: 12 September 1942; Vosges, German-occupied France
- Died: 20 July 2026 (aged 83); Paris, France
- Occupations: Television producer Screenwriter

Françoise Coquet (French: [fʁɑ̃swˈaz kokˈɛ]; 12 September 1942 – 20 July 2026) was a French television producer and screenwriter.

Coquet was known as the longtime producer of Michel Drucker shows such as Champs-Élysées and Vivement dimanche.

Coquet died of complications from dementia with Lewy bodies in Paris, on 20 July 2026, at the age of 83.

== Series produced ==
- Les Rendez-vous du dimanche (1970s)
- Stars (1980–1981)
- Champs-Élysées (1982–2013)
- Stars 90 (1990–1994)
- Studio Gabriel (1995–1996)
- Vivement dimanche (2000–2024)
- Vivement dimanche prochain (2008–2014)
