= Karol Stopa =

Polish sports journalist, commentator and tennis player (1948–2026)

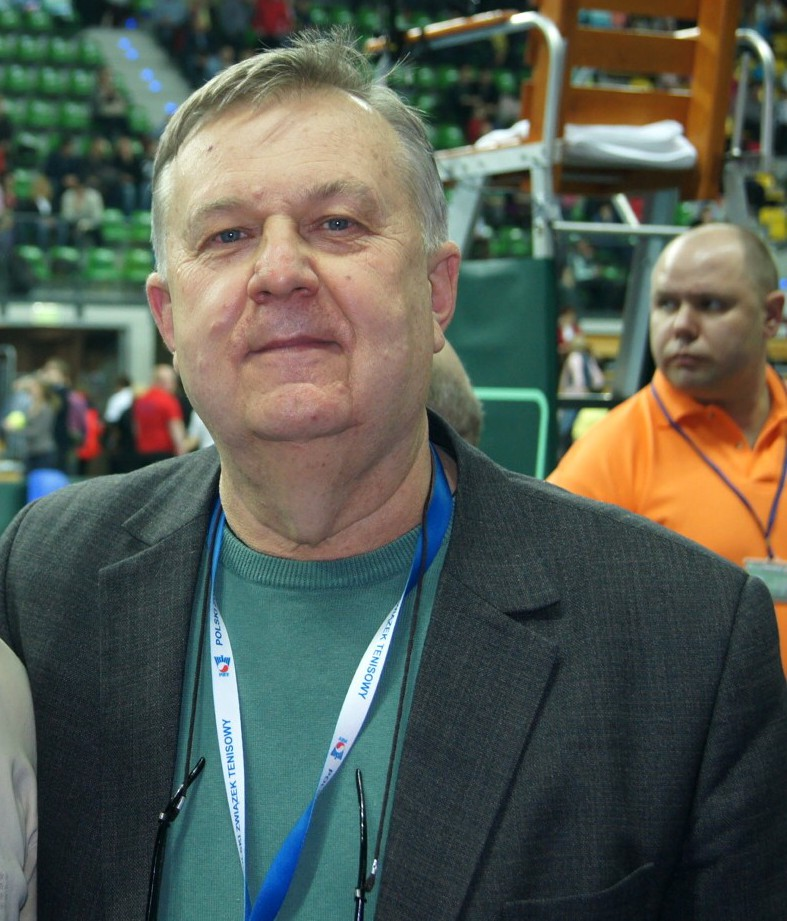
- Born: 12 March 1948; Warsaw, Poland
- Died: 9 July 2026 (aged 78)
- Education: University of Warsaw
- Occupations: Polish sports journalist, commentator and tennis player

Karol Stopa (12 March 1948 – 9 July 2026) was a Polish sports journalist, commentator and tennis player.

== Life and career ==
Stopa trained on the SKS Warszawianka courts in his youth. He graduated in law and journalism from the University of Warsaw. From 1971 to 1989 he was a journalist for Kurier Polski, and from 1978 to 1979 he was briefly associated with the editorial department of Przegląd Sportowy. In 1989 he became program secretary of the sports editorial department of Polish Television, and also worked there as a reporter, publisher of sports and journalistic programs and commentator. From 1997 to 1998, he was head of TVN's sports editorial department. From 1998, he was a regular tennis commentator on the Polish-language version of the Eurosport station.

Stopa died on 9 July 2026, at the age of 78.
