= Denyse Émond =

Canadian actress and comedian (1928–2026)

- Born: 10 May 1928; Montreal, Quebec, Canada
- Died: 13 July 2026 (aged 98); Sainte-Agathe-des-Monts, Quebec, Canada
- Occupations: Actress; comedian

Denyse Émond (10 May 1928 – 13 July 2026) was a Canadian actress and comedian who was best known for her role as Ti-Mousse in the comedic duo Ti-Gus et Ti-Mousse with Réal Béland Sr.. After Béland's death, she made appearances on television.

Émond died on 13 July 2026, at the age of 98.
