= Ahn Dong-seon =

South Korean politician (1935–2026)

- 안동선

Member of the National Assembly of South Korea
- In office 30 May 1992 – 29 May 2004
- In office 11 April 1985 – 29 May 1988

Personal details
- Born: 5 October 1935 Bucheon County, Korea, Empire of Japan
- Died: 20 July 2026 (aged 90)
- Party: NKDP; DP; NCNP; MDP
- Education: Sungkyunkwan University (BEc)
- Occupation: Civil servant

Ahn Dong-seon (Korean: 안동선; 5 October 1935 – 20 July 2026) was a South Korean politician. A member of several political parties, he served in the National Assembly from 1985 to 1988 and again from 1992 to 2004.

Ahn died on 20 July 2026, at the age of 90.
