= Günther Czichon =

German politician (1930–2026

Member of the Senate of Bremen
- In office 7 November 1979 – 10 November 1983
- Preceded by: Karl Willms
- Succeeded by: Wolfgang Kahrs

Member of the Bürgerschaft of Bremen
- In office 13 October 1983 – 31 July 1984
- In office 13 October 1967 – 12 October 1975

Personal details
- Born: 19 May 1930 Bremen, Germany
- Died: 20 July 2026 (aged 96)
- Party: SPD
- Education: Karlsruhe Institute of Technology
- Occupation: Engineer

Günther Czichon (19 May 1930 – 20 July 2026) was a German politician. A member of the Social Democratic Party, he served in the Bürgerschaft of Bremen from 1967 to 1975 and again from 1983 to 1984. He also served in the Senate of Bremen from 1979 to 1983.

Czichon died on 20 July 2026, at the age of 96.
