= Rainer Strobelt =

German writer (1947–2026)

- Born: 27 March 1947; Ahlen, North Rhine-Westphalia, Allied-occupied Germany
- Died: 26 July 2026 (aged 79)
- Occupation: Writer
- Writing career
- Notable work: Sarajevski dani poezije

Rainer Strobelt (27 March 1947 – 26 July 2026) was a German polyglot writer and poet.

== Early life and career ==
Rainer Strobelt was born in Ahlen on 27 March 1947. He completed a lesson as a sports journalist at a Bielefeld daily newspaper in 1966. He studied Slavistics and English studies from 1969 in Freiburg im Breisgau, Zagreb, and Münster. From 1977 to 2010, he worked as a foreign language teacher such as English, German and Russian. He also taught German as a foreign language in Croatia and served as a subject advisor for German in Bosnia and Herzegovina from 2002 to 2008.

Strobelt started his poetry career when he published and debuted in the Luxemburger Wort. He wrote in English, German and Croatian. Known for his concise style, many German poets such as Theo Breuer praised him as a master of the lyrical miniature and a colossal minimalist. In 2015 he had a reading appearance at Sarajevski dani poezije. In 2016, he introduced the fictional character Strittig in short prose, along with her pronouncements called the Strittlings.

== Personal life and death ==
Strobelt had been a widower from 2021 and was the father of three children. He died on 26 July 2026, at the age of 79.

== Literacy works ==
=== Poetry ===
- 68 plus. Gedichte. Runzheimer, Essen 1994.
- bei bäumen liegen. Gedichte. Rhön, Hünfeld 1997.
- z żabą i deszczem. Gedichte. Deutsch–Polnisch. Littera, Olsztyn 1998.
- ganz zu schweigen von. Gedichte. Segler, Freiberg 2000.
- telegramm an gryphius. Gedichte. Segler, Freiberg 2003.
- umland. Gedichte. Segler, Freiberg 2006.
- schöner ganzer frieden. Gedichte. Segler, Freiberg 2009.
- dein name steht wie eine welt. 123 Liebe-Gedichte. Segler, Freiberg 2013.
- leichte athletik. Launige Gedichte. Segler, Freiberg 2015.
- lüfte fragen. Gedichte. Chili, Verl 2021.
- An Deutschland. Gedichte aus dreißig Jahren. epubli, Berlin 2024.
- Von Sinnen. Gedichte aus dreißig Jahren. epubli, Berlin 2025.

=== Radio ===
- Stauraum. Offener Kanal Osnabrück, 14 October 1997.
- Zeit für Lyrik. Offener Kanal Osnabrück, 10 September 1999.
- Dialog der Künste – Tamara Boldak-Janowska und Rainer Strobelt. Allensteiner Welle, 25 June 2006.
- Rainer Strobelt und die Lyrik. Bürgerfunk Radio Warendorf, 13 September 2009.
- Region WAF: Rainer Strobelt, Dichter aus Warendorf. Moderation Klaus Aßhoff. NRWision (Erstsendung Radio WAF), 7 January 2020.
