= John Sheffield (physicist) =

British physicist (1936–2026)

- Born: 15 December 1936; London, England
- Died: 22 July 2026 (aged 89)
- Education: Imperial College London; University of London
- Occupation: Physicist
- Spouse: Sharon Curfman

John Sheffield (15 December 1936 – 22 July 2026) was a British physicist.

== Early life and career ==
Sheffield was born in London on 15 December 1936. He attended the Imperial College London, earning his BSc degree in 1958. He also attended the University of London, earning his MSc degree in 1962 and his PhD degree in physics in 1966. After earning his degrees, he joined the Fusion Research Center at the University of Texas at Austin.

In 1977, Sheffield joined the fusion division of the Oak Ridge National Laboratory (ORNL), a federally funded research and development center in Oak Ridge, Tennessee. During his time at ORNL, in 1981, he was named a fellow of the American Physical Society, and from 1988 to 1994, he served as division head. He also served as director for energy programs, and was executive director of the Joint Institute for Energy and Environment until 2003.

== Personal life and death ==
Sheffield was married to Sharon Curfman. Their marriage lasted until Sheffield's death in 2026. He died on 22 July 2026, at the age of 89.
