= Juan Carlos Lomeña =

Spanish politician (1953–2026)

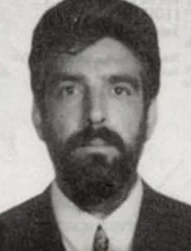
- Lomeña in 1991

Member of the Congress of Deputies
- In office 10 September 1991 – 13 April 1993
- Preceded by: José María Ruiz Povedano
- Constituency: Málaga

Mayor of Coín
- In office 1993–1995
- Preceded by: Francisco Moreno Ordóñez
- Succeeded by: Juan José Rodríguez Osorio

Spokesperson of the Socialist Group in the Provincial Deputation of Málaga
- In office 1995–1999

Provincial Delegate of Employment in Málaga Junta de Andalucía
- In office 2004–2010

Personal details
- Born: 24 November 1953 Coín, Málaga, Spain
- Died: 25 July 2026 (aged 72)
- Party: PSOE
- Spouse: Teresa Cantos González
- Children: 2
- Occupation: Politician

Juan Carlos Lomeña Villalobos (24 November 1953 – 25 July 2026) was a Spanish politician and civil servant who served as a member of the Congress of Deputies representing Málaga from 1991 to 1993 as the member of the Spanish Socialist Workers' Party in Andalusia. He was also elected to the municipal council of Coín in 1987 and later served as the mayor of Coín from 1993 to 1995. He was also the spokesperson for the Socialist Group in the Provincial Deputation of Málaga from 1995 to 1999, and Provincial Delegate of Employment for the Junta de Andalucía in Málaga from 2004 to 2010.

== Early life and career ==
Juan Carlos Lomeña Villalobos was born in Coín, Málaga on 24 November 1953. He studied Economics until the third year. He was a civil servant in the Provincial Deputation of Málaga. He also worked in the Málaga Provincial Council as a provincial deputy responsible for the Social Services Area, until 1991.

Lomeña continued as a member of parliament for Málaga in the Congress of Deputies from 1991 to 1993. He ended his term and became the mayor of Coín from 1993 to 1995. When his mayor term ended, he became the spokesperson for the Socialist Group in the Málaga provincial council from 1995 to 1999.

== Personal life and death ==
Lomeña was married to Teresa Cantos González, and together they had two children.

Lomeña died on 25 July 2026, at the age of 72.
