= Rudolf Friedrich (politician, born 1936) =

German politician (1936–2026)

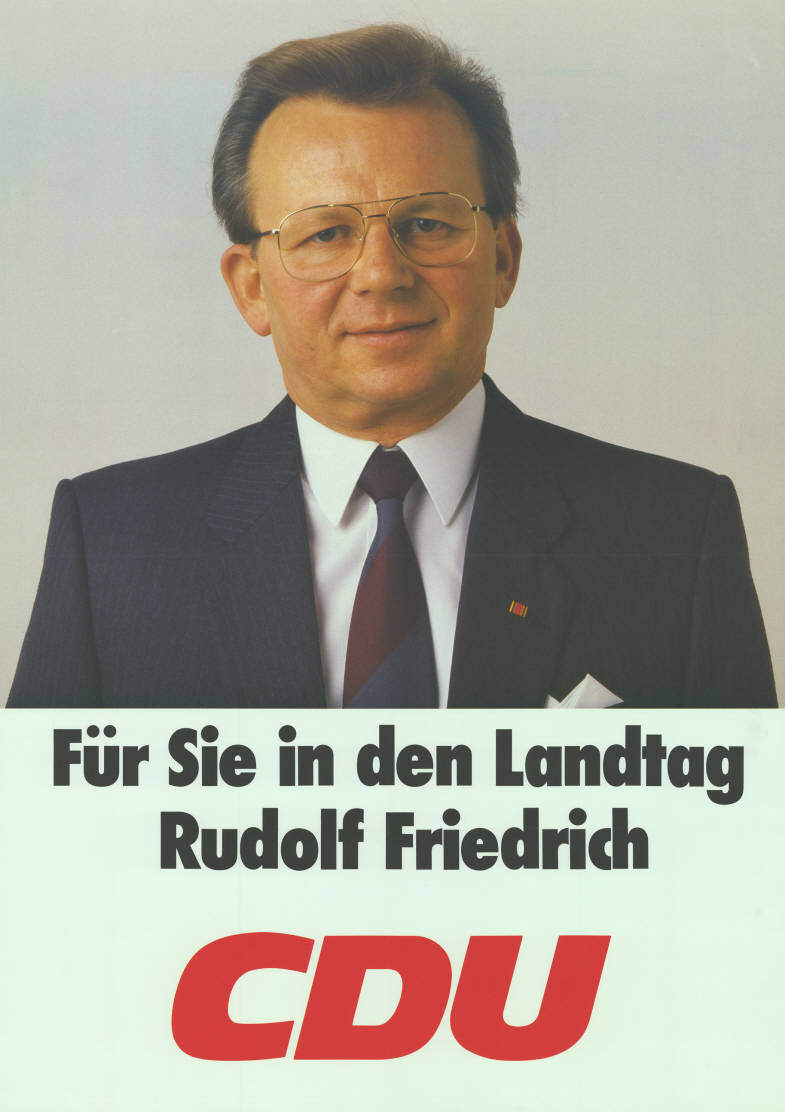
- Friedrich campaign poster (1987)

Member of the Landtag of Hesse
- In office 1 December 1974 – 4 April 2003

Personal details
- Born: 2 June 1936 Bělotín, Czechoslovakia
- Died: 9 July 2026 (aged 90)
- Party: CDU
- Occupation: Railway worker

Rudolf Friedrich (2 June 1936 – 9 July 2026) was a German politician. A member of the Christian Democratic Union, he served in the Landtag of Hesse from 1974 to 2003.

Friedrich died on 9 July 2026, at the age of 90.
