= Hugo Van Rompaey =

Belgian politician (1943–2026)

Member of the Senate of Belgium
- In office 9 December 1991 – 20 May 1995

Member of the Flemish Parliament
- In office 13 June 1995 – 12 June 1999

Member of the Flemish Council
- In office 22 December 1981 – 23 November 1991

Personal details
- Born: Hugo Jan Alida Van Rompaey; 21 February 1943 Geel, German-occupied Belgium and Northern France
- Died: 4 July 2026 (aged 83) Geel, Belgium
- Party: CVP
- Education: KU Leuven
- Occupation: Writer

Hugo Jan Alida Van Rompaey (21 February 1943 – 4 July 2026) was a Belgian politician. A member of the Christian People's Party, he served in the Senate from 1991 to 1995 and in the Flemish Council/Flemish Parliament from 1981 to 1991 and from 1995 to 1999.

Van Rompaey died in Geel on 4 July 2026, at the age of 83.
