= Ignacio Sánchez-Carpintero Plano =

Spanish geologist (1942–2026)

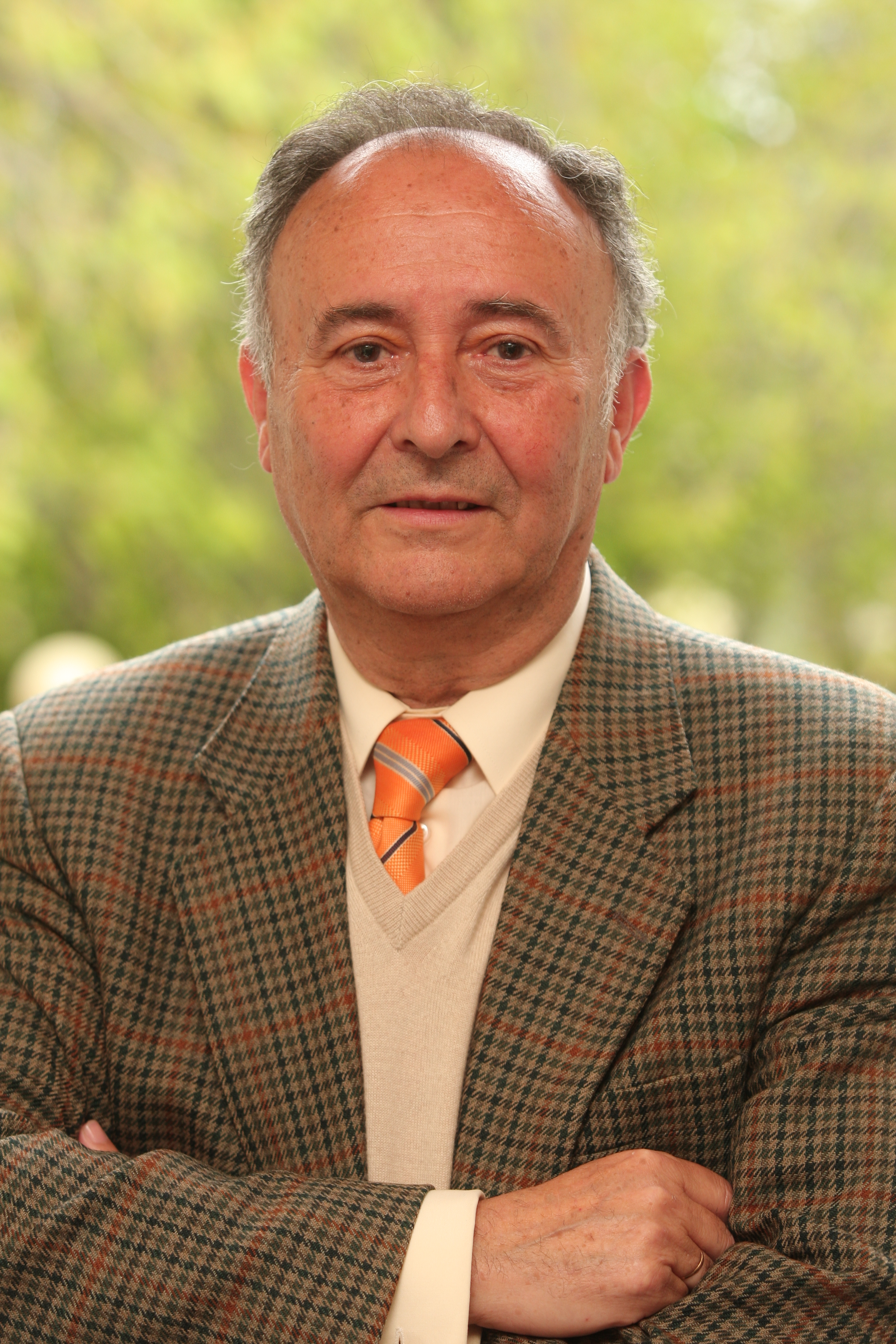
- Sánchez in 2009
- Born: 1 August 1942; Madrid, Spain
- Died: 26 July 2026 (aged 83); Pamplona, Spain
- Education: University of Madrid; University of Navarra
- Occupations: Geologist, academic
- Employer(s): University of Navarra; UNED
- Spouse: Teresa Abad
- Children: 10

Ignacio Sánchez-Carpintero Plano (1 August 1942 – 26 July 2026) was a Spanish geologist and academic. He taught geology at the University of Navarra for 43 years.

== Early life and career ==
Ignacio Sánchez-Carpintero Plano was born in Madrid on 1 August 1942. He earned a licentiate degree in Geological Sciences from the Complutense University of Madrid in 1967. He then moved to Pamplona to continue his academic career. In 1972, he defended the first thesis in Geology at the Faculty of Sciences of the University of Navarra titled Estudio geológico de las sierras de Leyre y Navascués.

Sánchez finished university with a diploma in Geological Photointerpretation from the Complutense University of Madrid, and with many grants that allowed him to further his studies and develop his research activity. He received the Ramón y Cajal grant, the grants from the Spanish National Research Council, and the grants for Training Research Personnel from the Ministry of Education.

He carried out his teaching work for 43 years at the Faculty of Sciences of the University of Navarra, where he was in charge of teaching the subjects of Physical Geography and Geomorphology, and was the director of the School of Technical Assistants of the Laboratory and at the National University of Distance Education, where he was a tutor professor and in charge of the subject of Crystallography.

== Personal life and death ==
Sánchez was married to Teresa Abad, they had ten children together; Rocío, Ignacio, Teresa, Javier, Fernando, Álvaro, Alfonso, Jaime, María and Beatriz Sánchez-Carpintero Abad.

Sánchez died in Pamplona on 26 July 2026, at the age of 83.
