= Claude Halmos =

French psychoanalyst and essayist (1946–2026)

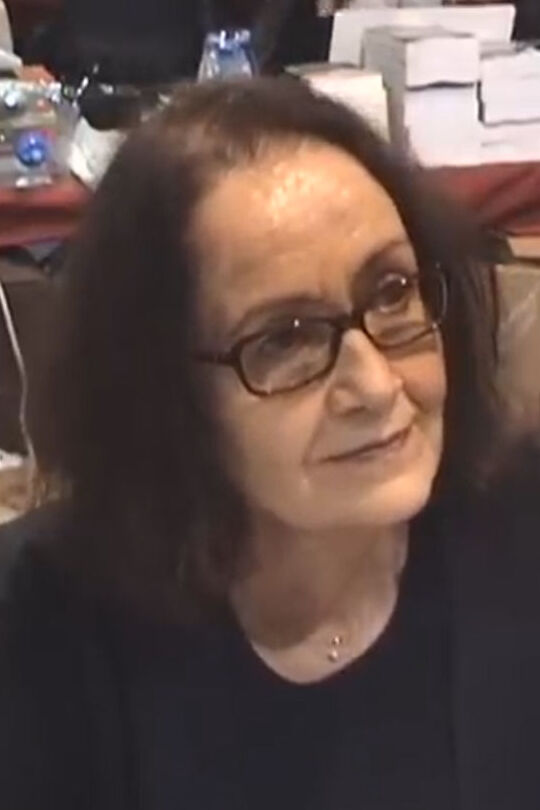
- Halmost in 2012
- Born: 30 April 1946; Châteauroux, France
- Died: 9 July 2026 (aged 80)
- Education: École expérimentale de Bonneuil-sur-Marne
- Occupations: Psychoanalyst; Essayist

Claude Halmos (French: [klˈod almˈo]; 30 April 1946 – 9 July 2026) was a French psychoanalyst and essayist.

== Life and career ==
Halmos was born into a Hungarian Jewish family; her father had escaped the Holocaust. A member of the Union Nationale des Étudiants de France, she studied child psychology under Françoise Dolto at the École expérimentale de Bonneuil-sur-Marne. She wrote numerous articles detailing her studies of abuse, neglect, and abandonment. She notably had her works published by Fayard and Casterman. From 1992 to 1997, she gave talks on the Canal+ show La Grande Famille. She was also a regular contributor to the French edition of the women's magazine Psychologies.

Halmos died on 9 July 2026, at the age of 80.

== Publications ==
- Un lieu pour vivre : Les enfants de Bonneuil, leurs parents et l'équipe des soignants (1984)
- Quelques pas sur le chemin de Françoise Dolto (1988)
- L'Enfant et la psychanalyse (1993)
- Parler, c'est vivre (1997)
- Pourquoi l'amour ne suffit pas : Aider l'enfant à se construire (2006)
- L'Autorité expliquée aux parents : Entretiens avec Hélène Mathieu (2008)
- Grandir : Les étapes de la construction de l'enfant, le rôle des parents (2009)
- L'autorité expliquée aux parents (2011)
- Dis-moi pourquoi : Parler à hauteur d'enfant (2012)
- Est-ce ainsi que les hommes vivent ? : faire face à la crise et résister (2014)
- Dessine-moi un enfant : L'enfant, sa construction, ses parents (2015)
- Savoir être (2016)
- Les aventures d'Uruburu (2017)
- Le pyjama de la tour Eiffel (2021)
