= Hans Roordink =

Dutch footballer (1943–2026)

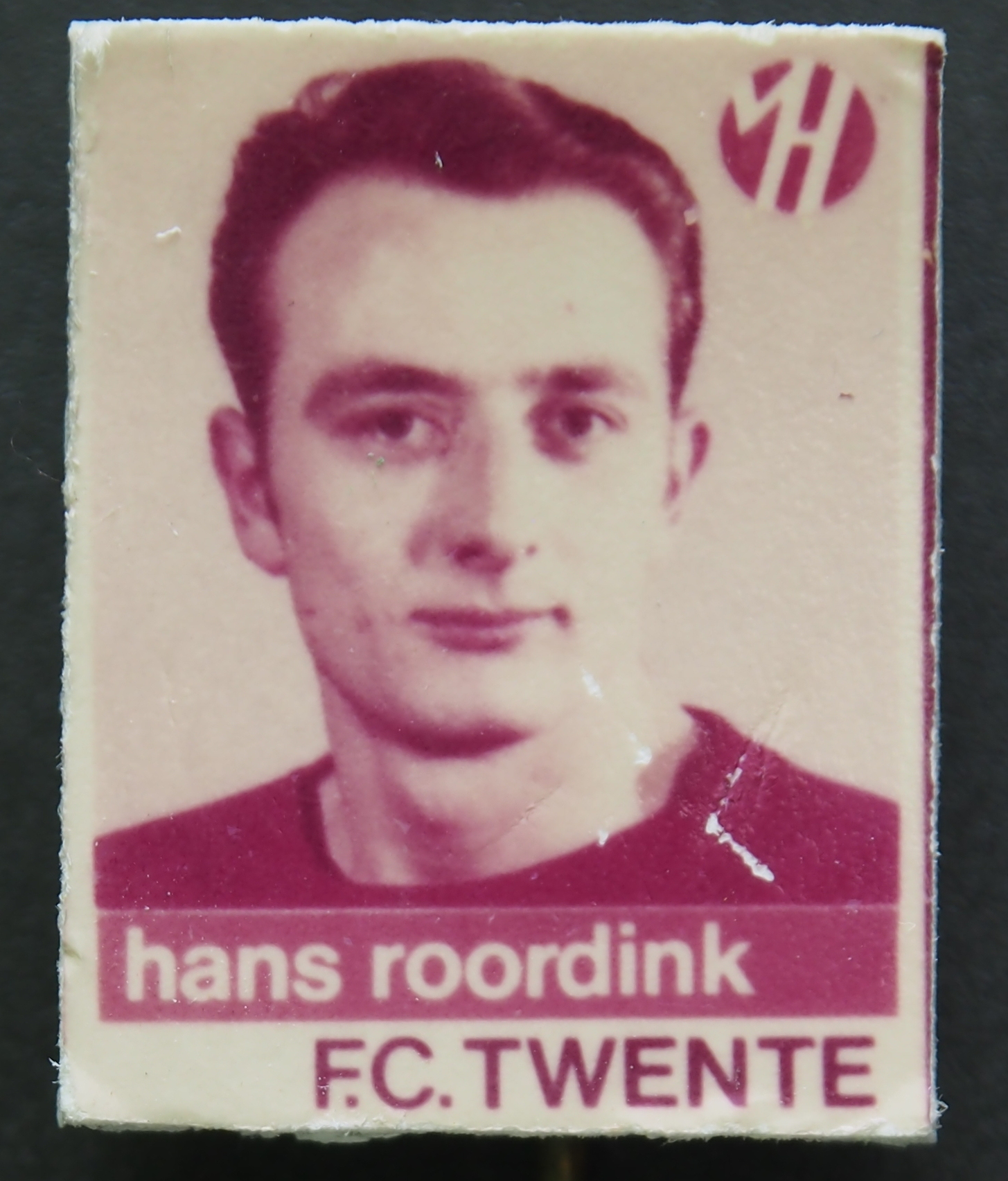

Personal information
- Date of birth: 8 September 1943
- Place of birth: Enschede, German-occupied Netherlands
- Date of death: 20 July 2026 (aged 82)
- Position: Forward

Senior career*
Years	Team	Apps	(Gls)
1961–1965	Enschedese Boys		
1965–1966	Twente	18	(12)
1966–1974	Heracles		
1974–1975	Enschedese Boys		
- * Club domestic league appearances and goals

Hans Roordink (8 September 1943 – 20 July 2026) was a Dutch footballer who played as a forward.

Roordink was notably the top scorer of the Eerste Divisie in 1965 with Enschedese Boys, scoring 19 goals. After playing for Twente and Heracles, he returned to Enschedese Boys at amateur level in 1974.

Roordink died on 20 July 2026, at the age of 82.
