= Primrose Bogatsu =

South African politician (died 2026)

Primrose Bogatsu MPL

Member of the North West Provincial Legislature
- In office 6 February 2023 – 17 July 2026
- Preceded by: Betty Daile

Personal details
- Died: 17 July 2026
- Party: Economic Freedom Fighters
- Profession: Politician

Primrose Bogatsu (died 17 July 2026) was a South African politician who was a member of the North West Provincial Legislature from February 2023 until July 2026, representing the Economic Freedom Fighters. Bogatsu was elected the deputy provincial chairperson of the EFF at the party's third Provincial People's Assembly in September 2022. She died on 17 July 2026.
