= Léon Strauss =

French historian and academic (1927–2026)

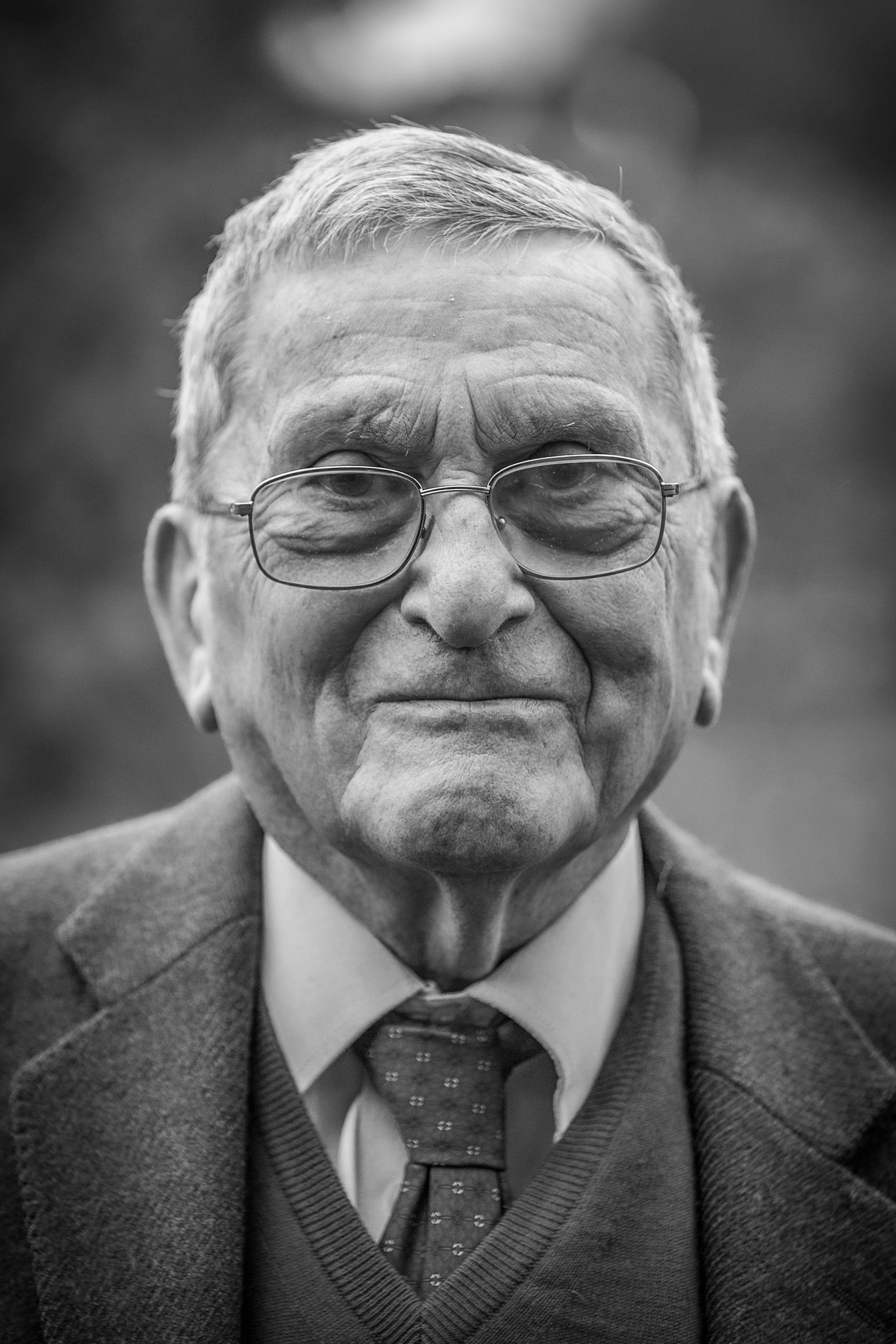
Strauss in 2013

Léon Strauss (14 August 1927 – 27 July 2026) was a French historian and academic, who specialised in 19th and 20th century history of Alsace.

== Life and career ==
Strauss was born in Sarrebourg, France on 14 August 1927. He studied the history of trade unionism and the labor movement, and the history of the Left in Alsace. Strauss was an honorary lecturer at the University of Strasbourg.

Strauss died on 27 July 2026, at the age of 98.

== Bibliography ==
- Uberfill, François (2016). Nouveau dictionnaire de biographie alsacienne [Alsatian new biography dictionary] (in French). Vol. 47. Strasbourg: Fédération des sociétés d'histoire et d'archéologie d'alsace. pp. 4961–4962. Archived from the original on 3 March 2016. "Léon Strauss"
