= Antonio Antonini =

Argentine architect (1936–2026)

- Born: Antonio Sergio Mauro Antonini; 8 June 1936
- Died: 1 July 2026 (aged 90)
- Education: University of Buenos Aires
- Occupation: Architect

Antonio Sergio Mauro Antonini (8 June 1936 – 1 July 2026) was an Argentine architect. He was a recipient of the Konex Prize in Architecture (1992).

Antonini was born on 8 June 1936, and died on 1 July 2026, at the age of 90.
