= Norman Ravitch =

American historian (1936–2026)

Norman Ravitch (November 22, 1936 – July 16, 2026) was an American historian and academic who was professor emeritus of history at University of California, Riverside. He wrote books, as well as occasional pieces for the Rockwell Foundation and other libertarian think-tanks. Ravitch was born in Brooklyn, New York, on November 22, 1936. He died on July 16, 2026, at the age of 89.
