= 2026 in France =

- Decades: 2000s; 2010s; 2020s; 2030s
- See also: History of France; Timeline of French history; List of years in France

Events in the year 2026 in France.

== Incumbents ==
- President: Emmanuel Macron
- Prime Minister: Sébastien Lecornu

== Events ==
=== January ===
- 5 January – A court in Paris convicts ten people on charges of cyber-bullying first lady Brigitte Macron by spreading disinformation and "malicious remarks" over her gender, sexuality and personal life.
- 8 January – Laurent Vinatier, a French researcher imprisoned in Russia since 2024 on charges of failing to register as a "foreign agent", is released in a prisoner swap in exchange for Russian basketball player Daniil Kasatkin, who had been detained in France since 2025 on suspicion of involvement in cyberhacking.
- 15 January – President Macron announces the deployment of additional military forces to Greenland after a Defense Council meeting amid threats by the United States to annex the island.
- 18 January – The Piton de la Fournaise volcano in Réunion erupts.
- 23 January – Prime minister Lecornu survives two no-confidence motions filed against him by the LFI and RN over his efforts to pass the government's budget through rarely-invoked provisions of the constitution.
- 25 January – The French Navy intercepts an oil tanker suspected of being part of the Russian shadow fleet and tows it to Marseille for investigation.
- 27 January – Former senator Joël Guerriau is convicted of putting MDMA on a drink of MP Sandrine Josso in an attempt to sexually assault her in 2023 and is sentenced to four years' imprisonment.

=== February ===
- 2 February
  - The Lecornu government passes the annual budget after surviving two no-confidence motions filed by the LFI and RN.
  - A French judge issues arrest warrants for two French-Israeli citizens, accusing them of "complicity and incitement to genocide" for blocking humanitarian aid trucks en route to Gaza.
- 3 February – A teacher is critically injured in a stabbing by a pupil inside a school in Toulon.
- 6 February – Greenland crisis: France announces that it will open a consulate in Greenland to reinforce support for Denmark against US president Donald Trump's threats to annex the territory.
- 7 February – Former culture minister Jack Lang resigns from the Institut du monde arabe after his name appears 670 times in the Epstein files.
- 8 February – Six people are arrested on suspicion of involvement in the abduction of a magistrate and her mother in Bourg-les-Valence, Drôme as part of a cryptocurrency ransom scheme.
- 10 February – Nine people are arrested as part of an investigation into the fraudulent reusage of admission tickets into the Louvre that resulted in at least 10 million euros ($11.8 million) in losses to the museum over the previous 10 years.
- 12 February – Far right activist Quentin Deranque is killed after being attacked during clashes between far left and far right activists in Lyon.
- 13 February
  - Two people are reported killed due to Storm Nils in Landes and Tarn-et-Garonne.
  - A knife-wielding assailant is shot dead by police after attempting to attack gendarmes near the Arc de Triomphe in Paris.
- 17 February – A canoe capsizes along the Loire in Chalonnes-sur-Loire amid heavy rainfall and flooding, leaving one person missing.
- 23 February – US ambassador Charles Kushner ignores a summons by the French foreign ministry over comments made regarding the killing of Quentin Deranque.
- 25 February – Laurence des Cars resigns as director of the Louvre amid criticism over recent incidents involving the museum. She is replaced by Christophe Leribault.

=== March ===
- 1 March – 2026 Israeli–United States strikes on Iran: Multiple Iranian Shahed drones strike the French naval air station at Camp de la Paix in Abu Dhabi, United Arab Emirates.
- 2 March
  - President Macron announces that France will increase its stockpile of nuclear weapons for the first time in decades, citing global threats such as Russia's war on Ukraine, China's growing military power in Asia, and changing U.S. defense priorities.
  - Denmark and France make an agreement on strategic nuclear deterrence. However, French nuclear weapons are not to be located on Danish territory.
- 3 March – France deploys Rafale fighter jets to the UAE in response to Iranian attacks.
- 4 March – Air France announces the suspension of flights between Paris, and Havana, Cuba, from March 29 until at least June 15 due to a jet fuel shortage in Cuba.
- 12 March – A French soldier is killed while six others are injured in a drone attack on their base in Mala Qara, Iraq.
- 15 March – 2026 French municipal elections (first round)
- 20 March – The French Navy boards the suspected Russian shadow fleet vessel Deyna in the Mediterranean Sea.
- 22 March – 2026 French municipal elections (second round)
- 26 March – France and the Philippines sign a visiting forces agreement.
- 28 March – A man is detained and another is at large after trying to ignite an improvised explosive device near a Bank of America building in Paris.

=== April ===
- 6 April – A nine-year old boy locked inside a utility van by his father since 2024 is rescued in Hagenbach.
- 7 April – A TGV train hits a military truck at a crossing between Béthune and Lens, killing the train driver and injuring 13 people.
- 9 April – Four migrants die after being swept away by currents in Équihen-Plage during an attempted crossing of the English Channel to the UK.
- 23 April – France and the United Kingdom sign a three-year agreement to reduce irregular crossings by migrants in the English Channel.

=== May ===
- 3 May – Two migrants die in an attempted crossing of the English Channel to the UK that results in their boat running aground near Neufchatel-Hardelot.
- 16 May – France's Monroe finishes 11th at Eurovision 2026 in Austria with their single "Regarde!".
- 20 May – France begins refusing temporary residence permits to Russians with humanitarian visas.
- 23 May – France bans Israeli national security minister Itamar Ben Gvir from entering the country, citing his “unspeakable” behavior against French and European 2026 Global Sumud Flotilla activists.
- 26 May – During the late-May heat wave, France records its hottest May day in history, with the national thermal indicator reaching 24.8 °C (76.6 °F). Seven people die from causes linked directly or indirectly to the heat, while hundreds of weather stations set monthly temperature records and Météo-France activates its national heat-warning system in May for the first time since its introduction in 2004.
- 29 May – The initial disappearance of Lyhanna Rameau Bernard, later leading to public outrage and protests.
- 31 May – Nationwide clashes between police and football fans celebrating Paris St-Germain's victory in the 2026 UEFA Champions League final leave one person dead, 219 injured and 780 arrested.

=== June ===
- 9 June – France prohibits Israeli Finance Minister Bezalel Smotrich from entering the country, citing promotion of West Bank annexation and "re-colonization" in Gaza.
- 11 June–19 July – France participates at the 2026 FIFA World Cup.
- 15–17 June – 52nd G7 summit in Évian-les-Bains.
- 17 June – US president Donald Trump and Iranian president Masoud Pezeshkian sign the Islamabad Memorandum to end the 2026 Iran war, with Trump signing the document during dinner with President Macron at the Palace of Versailles.
- 22 June – An intense heat wave leads Météo-France to place 49 departments under red "canicule" alerts and 40 others under orange alerts, with temperatures forecast to exceed 42 °C (108 °F) locally in parts of central and western France. At least three people die from heat-related health issues, while almost 2,700 schools close or modify timetables.
- 23 June
  - France experiences its hottest day on a national scale, with an average temperature of 29.8°C (85.6°F) across the country, beating the previous record of 29.4°C. The highest locally recorded temperature is 44.3°C, in Pissos.
  - More than 40 deaths from drowning are reported, due to people trying to cool themselves in rivers, canals, and other no-go areas.
  - The Golfech Nuclear Power Plant is temporarily shut down as water temperatures in the River Garonne exceed the recommended safety limit of 28°C, which is too high to cool the reactors.
- 24 June
  - A cliff collapses in Biarritz, killing one person and leaving another missing.
  - 2026 Ebola epidemic: France confirms its first case of Ebola in a doctor who returned from the Democratic Republic of the Congo on a humanitarian mission.
- 26 June – Burkina Faso breaks off diplomatic relations with France.
- 28 June – A pilot and ten parachutists are killed when a small plane crashes in Tomblaine.

=== July ===
- 7 July – The Paris appeals court allows Marine Le Pen to run for president in 2027 pending the result of an appeal to the Court of Cassation against her conviction for embezzlement of EU funds.
- 8 July – France repatriates 23 antiques to Syria that it had held since the Syrian civil war.
- 13 July – A major wildfire breaks out at Fontainebleau forest.
- 24–27 July – 2026 France wildfires: Authorities order the evacuation of the Cap Ferret peninsula and parts of the western suburbs of Bordeaux as major wildfires spread through Gironde and Landes. More than 250,000 residents and tourists are evacuated, and France requests firefighting assistance through the European Union Civil Protection Mechanism.
- 25 July – Six people are detained in a suspected plot targeting a synagogue in Sarcelles.
- 26 July – The beaches used during the Normandy landings in 1944 are designated as UNESCO World Heritage Sites.
- 27 July –
  - A man wounds three women with two kitchen knives in Paris. Two victims are seriously injured.
  - Twelve Torah scrolls are stolen from a synagogue in the vicinity of Paris.

=== August ===
- 12 August –
  - A total solar eclipse occurs at the Moon's descending node of the orbit in North America and Europe. The total eclipse passes over the Arctic, Greenland, Iceland, the Atlantic Ocean, northeastern Portugal and northern Spain.
  - A wildfire fire breaks out in Landes, displacing 650 people.
- 13 August – The French Foreign Ministry opens disciplinary proceedings against its ambassador to the Central African Republic, Bruno Foucher, following allegations that he brought around 30 young women to his official residence in Bangui from 2024 to 2026.
- 14 August – Decision 2026-911: The Constitutional Council rules that the social media ban for minors under 15 years of age violated the rights of minors.
- 24 August – A tornado hits Pomas, injuring 41 people.
- 25 August – France and Saudi Arabia agree to build a $7 billion theme park in the vicinity of Paris.
- 26 August – A car rams into pedestrians in Caen, killing two people and injuring nine others. The driver is arrested.

=== September ===
- 8 September –
  - A strike is held by staff at the Eiffel Tower in protest over the removal of female employees during a visit by Hindu religious group BAPS.
  - Four Renoir paintings are stolen from the Musée Renoir in Cagnes-sur-Mer.
  - France sanctions products from Israeli settlements in the West Bank.
- 11 September – A passenger train derails in Cléon, injuring 44 people.
- 22 September – Vincent Reynouard, a Holocaust denier, receives an eight-month prison sentence.
- 24 September – President Macron announces that the country will send soldiers to protect Saudi Arabia on a Red Sea oil route, as part of an accord with Riyadh.
- 25 September – Pope Leo XIV makes a four-day visit to France.
- 27 September – 2026 French Senate election

=== October ===
Protesters atop the Monument à la République in Paris during a demonstration

- 1 October – Following the nationwide spread of high school student protests sparked by complaints about underfunded schools, teacher shortages, and lengthy schedules, Prime Minister Lecornu calls an emergency crisis meeting and orders ministers to cancel official travel.
- 2 October – The US imposes sanctions on Hamas' financing network, which includes two French-based funds.
- 10 October – Authorities imprison the leader of a sadist Nazi group that forced young women and girls, many of whom were black or Jewish, to perform sexual acts, submit naked pictures, and, in some cases, tortured them.
- 11 October –
  - 2026 French Socialist Party presidential primary: Raphaël Glucksmann is selected as a common candidate by the Socialist Party and other aligned parties after winning 66.13% of the vote.
  - 2026 French supermarket refrigerator hack: A major cyberattack targets refrigeration units of hundreds of supermarkets nationwide, causing fires and tens of millions of euros worth of losses from food spoilage. It is the first cyberattack to cause major disruption to a nation's food supply chain.
- 12 October – A student injures two faculty members in a school shooting in Aubagne.
- 15 October – A bus collides with a stationary freight train at the loading platform of the Channel Tunnel in Coquelles, injuring 19 people.
- 17 October – 17 October riots: Rioting occurs in several places amid nationwide protests over rising living costs and deteriorating school conditions; thousands of businesses are looted, a tourist office is set on fire in Lyon, and the Hôtel de Ville in Limoges is burnt. At least 1,200 people are arrested across France.
- 21 October – A Mirage 2000D fighter jet attached to Nancy – Ochey Air Base crashes near Nancy, killing one person.
- 22 October –
  - One person is killed and at least four others injured—including a 12-year-old girl who was shot eight times—during a gun attack in Yvelines.
  - Authorities announce the first known human case of Shamonda virus in a patient who died at a hospital in Lyon.
- 25 October – Marine Le Pen announces her presidential campaign.

=== November ===
- 4 November – A cyber-strike on several blood banks is foiled before it could cause any damage to blood supplies or samples.
- 5 November –
  - An Aer Lingus flight from Dublin to Rome is diverted to an air base in Normandy after being subjected to bomb threats that are subsequently found to be false.
  - A court in Paris orders that a painting by Camille Pissarro be returned to the descendants of its original Jewish owner after Nazis stole it during World War II.
- 6 November – A bus crashes into a tree in Lent, Jura, killing two people.
- 9 November – France's ANSSI attributes the 2026 French supermarket refrigerator hack to Iran's IRGC-affiliated Shahid Kaveh group, adding that it found links to another IRGC cyber unit, Shahid Shoostari, to multiple French cyberattacks since 2020, including those targeting the Charlie Hebdo newspaper in 2023 and the 2024 Summer Olympics.

=== Predicted and scheduled events ===
- 12 December – Miss France 2027

== Holidays ==
- 1 January – New Year's Day
- 3 April – Good Friday†
- 5 April – Easter
- 6 April – Easter Monday
- 1 May – International Workers' Day
- 8 May – Victory Day
- 14 May – Ascension Day
- 24 May – Whit Sunday
- 25 May – Whit Monday
- 14 July – Bastille Day
- 15 August – Assumption Day
- 1 November – All Saints' Day
- 11 November – Armistice Day
- 25 December – Christmas Day
- 26 December – Saint Stephen's Day†

†Good Friday and St Stephen's Day are observed in Alsace and Moselle only

== Deaths ==
- 4 January – Calbo, 52, rapper (Ärsenik).
- 6 January – Odette Bergoffen, 101, resistance fighter.
- 8 January – Sergio Goizauskas, 69, cartoonist.
- 12 January –
  - Rolland Courbis, 72, football player (Monaco) and manager (Bordeaux, Marseille).
  - Alain Orsoni, 71, politician, Corsican independence activist and president of AC Ajaccio.
- 17 January – Thierry Cazeneuve, 74, journalist and writer, director of Critérium du Dauphiné (1988–2009).
- 23 January – Maurice Le Coutour, 111, supercentenarian.
- 13 February – Brahim Bahrir, 47–48, convicted terrorist.
- 6 March – André Kabile, 87, footballer (Nîmes Olympique).
- 22 March – Lionel Jospin, 88, prime minister (1997–2002), minister of national education (1988–1992), and member of the Constitutional Council (2015–2019).
- 26 March – Jean-Pierre Faye, 100, philosopher (horseshoe theory) and writer.
- 17 April – Nathalie Baye, 77, actress (Every Man for Himself, Strange Affair, Catch Me If You Can).
- 4 May – Hermano da Silva Ramos, 100, French-Brazilian racing driver (Formula One).
- 6 May – Pierre-François Veil, 72, lawyer and civil servant, president of the Fondation pour la Mémoire de la Shoah (since 2023).
- 14 May – Claudine Longet, 72, singer and actress (McHale's Navy, The Party).
- 24 May – Béatrice Bellamy, 59, politician, MP (since 2022).
- 25 May – Pierre Deny, 69, actor (Tomorrow Is Ours, The African Woman, Emily in Paris).
- 26 May – Gaël Da Silva, 41, Olympic gymnast (2012).
- 29 May –
  - Bryan Bergougnoux, 43, football player (Tours, Toulouse) and manager (Thonon Evian).
  - Edgar Morin, 104, philosopher (polycrisis).
- 1 June – André Santini, 85, deputy (2009–2017) and mayor of Issy-les-Moulineaux (since 1980).
- 2 June – Daniel Costelle, 90, documentarist and film director (Apocalypse: The Second World War, Apocalypse: World War I).
- 4 June – Marjane Satrapi, 56, Iranian-born author (Chicken with Plums) and director (Persepolis, Dear Paris).
- 5 June – Bernadette Chirac, 93, spouse of the president (1995–2007).
- 7 June – Jeannette Weiss Gruber, 91, glass painter.
- 11 June – Charlie Dalin, 42, offshore sailor.
- 19 June – Claude Guillemot, 69, businessman, co-founder of Ubisoft.
- 22 June – Saïd Haddou, 43, road bicycle racer.
- 2 July – Bertrand Grébaut, 44, restaurateur.
- 11 July – Jean-Paul Pigasse, 86, journalist, director-general of ADIAC (since 1997).
- 16 July – Jean-Jacques Naudo, 67, rugby league player (Baroudeurs de Pia XIII, XIII Catalan) and gangster.
- 19 July – Philippe Josse, 65, member of the Conseil d'État (since 2011).
- 20 July – Philippe Chaulet, 83, Guadeloupean politician, member of the National Assembly (1993–2002) and mayor of Bouillante (1984–2005).
- 21 July – Anicia Berton, 50, Martiniquais environmental and social activist.
- 25 July – Marie-Paule Belle, 80, musician and actress.
- 28 July – Kavinsky, 50, musician ("Nightcall", "Odd Look") and actor.
- 6 August – Kapeliele Faupala, 86, Wallisian traditional ruler, king of Uvea (2008–2014).
- 17 August – Nicolas Altmayer, 61, film producer (Sky Fighters, The First Day of the Rest of Your Life, The New Girlfriend).
- 19 August – François Patriat, 83, senator (since 2008), minister of agriculture (2002), and twice deputy.
- 25 August – Dominique Alderweireld, 77, procurer and brothel owner.
- 31 August –
  - Daniel Spagnou, 85, deputy (2002–2012) and mayor of Sisteron (1983–2026).
  - Édouard Balladur, 97, prime minister (1993–1995), minister of finance (1986–1988), and twice deputy.
  - Jean-François Leroy, 69, journalist and photographer, director of Visa pour l'Image (since 1989).
- 6 September – Israël Isaac Besançon, 81, French-Israeli rabbi and painter.
- 12 September – Lungskull, 20, rapper.
- 22 September –
  - Arnaud Denis, 43, actor (Yves Saint Laurent, Elles et Moi, Candice Renoir) and stage director.
  - Lucien Lazare, 101, French-Israeli history teacher and resistance fighter.
- 30 September – Gabriel Serville, 67, deputy (2012–2021), member (2010–2012) and president (since 2021) of the Assembly of French Guiana.
- 4 October – Prince Waly, 34, rapper.
- 9 October – Elizabeth Fontan-Binoche, 100, harpist.
- 10 October – Pierre Joliot, 94, biologist, member of the French Academy of Sciences.
- 22 October –
  - Mélanie Berger-Volle, 105, Austrian-born World War II veteran.
  - Claude Cohen-Tannoudji, 93, physicist (Quantum Mechanics, Sisyphus cooling), Nobel Prize laureate (1997).
- 23 October – Jean-Paul Huchon, 80, president of the Regional Council of Île-de-France (1998–2015).
- 26 October – Michèle Barzach, 83, politician, minister of health (1986–1988), MP (1988–1990).
- 5 November – Nimeño I, 81, bullfighter.
- 10 November – Solange Alexandre, 104, resistance fighter.
- 19 November –
  - Roger Boulanger, 100, teacher, last survivor of the Natzweiler-Struthof concentration camp.
  - David Habib, 65, MP (since 2002).

== See also ==
=== Country overviews ===
- History of France
- History of modern France
- Outline of France
- Government of France
- Politics of France
- Years in France
- Timeline of France history
