= 2024 in France =

- Decades: 2000s; 2010s; 2020s; 2030s
- See also: History of France; Timeline of French history; List of years in France

Events in the year 2024 in France.

== Incumbents ==
- President: Emmanuel Macron (REM)
- Prime Minister:
  - Élisabeth Borne (REM) (until 9 January)
  - Gabriel Attal (until 5 September)
  - Michel Barnier (until 13 December)
  - François Bayrou onwards
- President of the French Senate: Gérard Larcher

== Events ==
=== January ===
- 2024 France floods
- 9 January – Gabriel Attal becomes the youngest and first openly gay Prime Minister of France.
- 18 January – 2024 French farmers' protests are held against French and EU agricultural policy.
- 23 January – A woman is killed while her husband and their daughter, all FNSEA members, are injured after a car crashes into a roadblock in Pamiers at the 2024 French farmers' protests.
- 26 January – Indian Prime Minister Narendra Modi and French President Emmanuel Macron celebrate India's Republic Day together, with Macron being the Chief Guest at the Republic Day parade in New Delhi.
- 28 January – Protesters advocating for sustainable food throw soup at the Mona Lisa in the Louvre. The painting is protected by bulletproof glass and is undamaged.

=== February ===
- 10 February – Électricité de France shuts down two nuclear reactors due to a fire at the Chinon Nuclear Power Plant.
- 21 February – Entry of Missak Manouchian and Mélinée Manouchian into the Panthéon.

=== April ===
- April–ongoing – Two people die in a cholera epidemic in Mayotte.
- 19 April – A man is arrested after threatening to blow himself up near the Iranian Embassy in Paris.
- 22 April – Kendji Girac, the winner of the 2014 series of The Voice: la plus belle voix, is shot in Biscarrosse.
- 24 April – The union representing air traffic controllers in France cancels a planned 24-hour strike, although a majority of flights had already been cancelled.

=== May ===
- Backlash France takes place in Lyon
- May 5 – Chinese President Xi Jinping begins his European tour, starting in France, Serbia and ending in Hungary.
- May 13–28 – 2024 New Caledonia unrest – A state of emergency is declared in New Caledonia after riots break out amid debate over a proposed electoral reform in the territory. Six people, including a police officer are killed, and at least 60 others are injured.
- May 14 –
  - Two prison officers are killed in an attack on a van carrying inmate Mohamed Amra near Rouen that results in his escape.
  - The 77th annual Cannes Film Festival opens in Cannes, with an honorary Palme d'Or award for Meryl Streep.
- May 17 – An armed man is shot dead by police in Rouen after he threatens to attack a synagogue.
- May 18 – The exclusive Harry Winston boutique in Paris is targeted in an armed robbery that results in the loss of “several million euros’” worth of items.
- May 22 – An 18-year old man from Chechnya is arrested on suspicion of plotting an attack on a football match at the Stade Geoffroy-Guichard in Saint-Etienne during the 2024 Paris Olympics.
- May 23 – Staff at France Médias Monde, France Télévisions and Radio France go on strike in protest against plans for a merger of the public broadcasting sector proposed by Culture Minister Rachida Dati.
- May 31 – France bans Israeli defense firms from exhibiting at Eurosatory.

=== June ===
- 3 June – A Russian-Ukrainian national is arrested north of Paris and subsequently charged with plotting a bomb attack and other terrorism offences.
- 4 June – Russian Foreign Minister Sergey Lavrov warns that French military instructors will be "legitimate targets" if they are deployed to Ukraine.
- 6 June –
  - Commemoration of the 80th anniversary of the D-Day landings.
  - The Investigative Committee of Russia announces the arrest of a French national in Moscow on suspicion of failing to register with authorities as a foreign agent and collecting information on the Russian military.
  - President Macron announces that the country will send Dassault Mirage 2000-5 fighter aircraft to Ukraine and train its pilots by the end of 2024.
- 9 June –
  - After the National Rally emerges as the largest party in the French contingent during the 2024 European Parliament election, President Macron dissolves the National Assembly and announces snap parliamentary elections on 30 June and 7 July.
  - 2024 French Open: In tennis, Carlos Alcaraz wins the Men's singles title at the French Open after defeating Alexander Zverev in the final, earning his third Grand Slam title.
- 10 June – The Chanel branch in Paris' Avenue Montaigne is targeted by a car-ramming attack as part of a robbery.
- 11 June –
  - The president of The Republicans, Éric Ciotti, speaks in favor of an alliance with the National Rally during an interview with TF1. Olivier Marleix, the head of the party in the National Assembly, calls for Ciotti's resignation in response.
  - France's left wing political parties form a New Popular Front ahead of the parliamentary elections.
- 12 June – 2024 The Republicans crisis – The Republicans votes unanimously to remove its leader Éric Ciotti for attempting to form an electoral alliance with Marine Le Pen's far-right National Rally. On 14 June, a Paris court reviews the decision and rules in Ciotti's favor.
- 15 June – Over 600,000 people march in Paris and other cities nationwide to protest against the far-right National Rally.
- 16 June – 2024 24 Hours of Le Mans: In endurance racing, the AF Corse Ferrari team wins the 24 Hours of Le Mans for the second consecutive year, with drivers Antonio Fuoco, Miguel Molina, and Nicklas Nielsen.
- 19 June:
  - The European Commission reprimands Belgium, France, Hungary, Italy, Malta, Poland, and Slovakia for breaking budget rules.
  - Two teenagers are charged with the gang rape of a 12-year-old Jewish girl in Courbevoie, in an attack suspected to have been motivated by anti-Semitism.
  - One person is killed by police after stabbing two people with a screwdriver in Aubervilliers.
- 21 June – France reports nearly 200 cases of cholera in Mayotte.
- 23 June – 2024 New Caledonia unrest: Independence leader Christian Tein and seven other activists are flown to France for pre-trial detention after being arrested for inciting violence and riots in New Caledonia.
- 26 June – The French government orders the dissolution of the far-right Groupe Union Défense and several other far-right and Islamic extremist groups, citing risks of violence.
- 29 June – One person is killed and five others are injured following a shooting at a wedding hall in Thionville.
- 30 June –
  - 2024 French legislative election: Voters select candidates in the first round of legislative elections for the 17th National Assembly.
  - Thousands of left-wing protesters gather in cities across France to protest the National Rally's lead in election polls, while showing support for the New Popular Front.

=== July ===
- 3 July – Prisca Thevenot, Spokesperson of the Government of France and Renaissance candidate for Hauts-de-Seine's 8th constituency is attacked along with a supporter while putting up campaign posters in Meudon. Several suspects are arrested.
- 4 July – Film director Benoît Jacquot is charged with the rapes of actresses Julia Roy and Isild Le Besco between 1998 and 2000, and "rape, sexual assault and violence" committed between 2013 and 2018.
- 7 July: 2024 French legislative election (second round):
  - No party wins a majority in the National Assembly, with the left-wing New Popular Front gaining a plurality of seats and the far-right National Rally coming in third place.
  - Prime Minister Gabriel Attal announces that he will resign effective July 8. However, his resignation is rejected on that day by President Macron, who asks him to remain in office "for the time being".
- 11 July – A fire damages the spire of the 11th-century Rouen Cathedral during restoration. No further damage or injuries are reported.
- 12 July – A new political party L'Après is founded by dissidents from La France Insoumise.
- 13 July – Three people are killed and four injured after a mass shooting at a birthday party in Espinasse-Vozelle. The perpetrator commits suicide.
- 15 July – A soldier is injured in a knife attack while on patrol at the Gare de l'Est station in Paris. The perpetrator is arrested.
- 16 July – President Macron approves the resignation of Prime Minister Attal and his cabinet, but maintains Attal as head of a transitional caretaker government.
- 17 July – An 18-year old man is arrested in Bas-Rhin on suspicion of plotting attacks inspired by far-right extremism during the Paris Olympics.
- 18 July:
  - Seven people are killed in a suspected arson attack on an apartment in Nice.
  - A police officer is injured in a knife attack along the Champs-Elysees in Paris. The assailant is shot dead.
- 22 July – President Macron opens the 142nd IOC Session in Paris.
- 23 July:
  - La France Insoumise introduces legislation to reverse pension changes and revert the legal retirement age to 62 years, with the National Rally offering support for the advancement of the legislation.
  - A Russian national is arrested on suspicion of plotting acts of "destabilisation" during the Paris Olympics.
- 24 July – At the International Olympic Committee session before the start of the 2024 Summer Olympics in Paris, it is announced that the French Alps region has been conditionally approved to host the 2030 Winter Olympics.
- 26 July
  - 2024 France railway arson attack: A series of attacks are staged on the infrastructure of the TGV and Eurostar rail networks, resulting in damage and cancellations.
  - The opening ceremonies of the 2024 Summer Olympics take place on the bank of the River Seine and the Jardins du Trocadéro in Paris.
- 29 July –
  - French police arrest a far-left extremist who may have been behind an attack on the long-distance train network ahead of the opening of the 2024 Olympic Games in Paris.
  - French police report multiple sabotage acts targeting telecommunications operators across six areas of the country, affecting 11,000 clients. The incidents are treated as vandalism. No one has been arrested and no group has claimed responsibility.
  - Olympic organisers cancel the second session of triathlon training due to water quality concerns in the Seine.
- 30 July –
  - Algeria withdraws its ambassador from France after the latter declares its support for the Western Sahara Autonomy Proposal, which was proposed by Morocco in 2007.
  - Olympic officials postpone the men's individual triathlon race due to poor water quality levels in the Seine river.
  - Several athletes test positive for COVID-19, including Australian swimmer Lani Pallister, forcing her to withdraw from the 1500 metre freestyle swimming event.

=== August ===
- 7 August – French police detain Australian field hockey player Tom Craig for allegedly purchasing cocaine.
- 9 August – French police arrest Egyptian wrestler Mohamed Ibrahim El-Sayed in Paris for alleged sexual assault.
- 11 August – The closing ceremonies of the 2024 Summer Olympics take place at the Stade de France.
- 14 August – Two pilots are killed following a midair collision between two Dassault Rafale fighter jets of the French Air Force over Colombey-les-Belles.
- 16 August – A Fouga CM.170 Magister crashes into the Mediterranean Sea off the coast of Le Lavandou during an air show, killing its pilot.
- 21 August – A man is shot and injured by police after setting fire to the town hall of Angoulême.
- 24 August –
  - Two cars explode in an arson attack on a synagogue in La Grande-Motte, injuring a police officer. A 33-year old Algerian suspect who was seen wrapped in a Palestinian flag following the attack is injured after resisting arrest in Nîmes.
  - Telegram CEO Pavel Durov is arrested at Paris–Le Bourget Airport. On 28 August 28, prosecutors formally indict him with complicity in distribution of child exploitation media and drug trafficking and ban him from leaving France.
- 27 August –
  - The New Popular Front shuts down future talks with President Macron to break political deadlock after Macron refuses to implement a leftist-led coalition government despite the NFP receiving the most votes and calls for nationwide protests against Macron's "parody of democracy".
- 28 August – 8 September: 2024 Summer Paralympics.
- 29 August – Serbia and French aerospace manufacturer Dassault Aviation sign an agreement for the purchase of 12 Dassault Rafale warplanes.

=== September ===
- 3 September – A boat carrying migrants breaks apart in the English Channel off the coast of Le Portel, killing at least 12 passengers. Sixty-five others are rescued.
- 5 September – Michel Barnier is named the Prime Minister of France, two months after legislative elections in July.
- 7 September – Nationwide protests against President Macron's appointment of Michel Barnier as the prime minister break out in 130 cities and towns nationwide, with the New Popular Front claiming that Macron stole the June and July parliamentary election.
- 10 September – Four climbers from Italy and South Korea are found dead on the French side of Mont Blanc after being reported missing on 7 September.
- 15 September – A boat carrying migrants breaks apart in the English Channel off the coast of Ambleteuse, killing at least eight passengers. Fifty-one others are rescued.
- 16–17 September – At least seven people, including six police officers, are injured during protests against high living costs in Martinique.
- 18–19 September – Two people are killed in an operation by security forces against pro-independence activists in Saint-Louis, New Caledonia.
- 20 September – Murder of Philippine Le Noir de Carlan.
- 21 September – President Macron presents the Barnier government, mostly composed of centrist and right-wing figures.
- 23 September – The Government sends the Compagnies Républicaines de Sécurité elite riot police to Martinique for the first time since 1959, following resistance from cost of living and social inequality protesters against bans on demonstrations issued by Paris.
- 25 September – The Barnier government expresses willingness to work with the National Rally's proposals to toughen immigration and crime laws following the murder of a 19-year-old woman in Paris by a Moroccan national.

=== October ===
- 1 October –
  - Prime Minister Barnier announces a one-year postponement of provincial elections in New Caledonia that were previously scheduled in December 2024.
  - Exiled Azerbaijani opposition activist Vidadi Isgandarli dies from wounds sustained in an attack inside his apartment in Mulhouse on 29 September.
- 3 October – Peter Cherif, an associate of the perpetrators of the Charlie Hebdo shooting in 2015, is sentenced to life imprisonment on terrorism charges.
- 4 October – The Court of Justice of the European Union overturns decrees by the French government banning manufacturers of plant-based meats from labeling their products as meat products, citing the lack of legal definitions.
- 7 October – Nearly a dozen police officers and several demonstrators are injured in renewed protests in Fort-de-France, Martinique.
- 8 October –
  - Three people are arrested in the Toulouse area on suspicion of plotting terrorist attacks.
  - The Barnier government survives a no-confidence motion filed by the New Popular Front.
- 9 October –
  - One person is killed in Sète due to extreme weather caused by Ex-Hurricane Kirk.
  - One person is killed during protests in Martinique.
- 10 October – Protesters occupy the tarmac of Martinique Aimé Césaire International Airport overnight and try to enter the terminal, disrupting several flights and trapping hundreds of passengers. Authorities also declare a ban on protests in the territory.
- 12 October – A Tesla car crashes into a road sign and catches fire near Niort, killing all four people on board.
- 16 October – The body of missing teenager Lina Delsarte is found in Nièvre.
- 17 October – France becomes the first European Union member state to grant asylum to military deserters without travel documents or foreign passports after it grants visas to six Russian soldiers seeking to avoid service in Ukraine.
- 21 October – A nationwide manhunt is launched for the parents of a 17-day-old premature infant boy abducted from a hospital in Seine-Saint-Denis. The infant is found in Amsterdam, where his parents are also arrested.
- 25 October – The entirety of Guadeloupe loses electricity after striking workers shut down the main Électricité de France station in the territory.

=== November ===
- 1 November – Five people are injured in a shooting at a restaurant in Poitiers, sparking a mass brawl involving up to 600 people.
- 4 November – The French Boxing Federation announces its withdrawal from the International Boxing Association, citing a need to maintain its presence in the Olympics.
- 5 November – A court in Lille convicts 18 people, mostly from Iraq, for their role in smuggling migrants across the English Channel to the United Kingdom and sentences them to up to 15 years' imprisonment.
- 14 November – The Académie Française releases the ninth edition of the Dictionnaire de l'Académie française, replacing its previous edition published in 1935.
- 28 November – Authorities announce the arrest of 26 people and the seizure of 11 million euros in assets as part of an eight-month operation against a human trafficking network sending migrants from South Asia.
- 29 November – France officially recognises the killing of up to 400 members of the Tirailleurs Sénégalais by the French Army in Thiaroye, present-day Senegal in 1944 as a massacre.

=== December ===
- 1 December – A bus crashes into a cliff near Porte-Puymorens, killing two people and injuring 33 others.
- 4 December – Michel Barnier becomes the first prime minister of France to be removed in a no-confidence vote since 1962, following a motion filed by far-left MPs and supported by the National Rally.
- 7 December – Notre-Dame de Paris reopens to the public following renovations prompted by the 2019 fire.
- 13 December – President Macron appoints MoDem leader François Bayrou as prime minister.
- 14 December –
  - Cyclone Chido makes landfall over Mayotte, killing at least 39 people.
  - Quintuple murder near Dunkirk - Five people are killed in separate shootings in Loon-Plage and Wormhout. A suspect is arrested on suspicion of committing both incidents.
- 15 December – Pope Francis arrives in Ajaccio to undertake the first papal visit to Corsica.
- 18 December – The Court of Cassation upholds the conviction of former president Nicolas Sarkozy for corruption and influence peddling after attempting to bribe a magistrate during a separate legal case against him.
- 19 December – Mazan rapes: Dominique Pelicot and 50 others are convicted of raping Pelicot's then wife, Gisèle Pelicot. Dominique is sentenced to the maximum penalty of 20 years imprisonment.
- 20 December – Eight people are convicted for the murder of Samuel Paty in 2020.
- 21 December – The European Pressurized Reactor, the largest nuclear reactor in France, begins commercial operations at the Flamanville Nuclear Power Plant in Normandy.
- 23 December – President Macron presents the Bayrou government.
- 29 December – Three migrants die in a suspected maritime incident in the English Channel off the coast of Sangatte.

== Holidays ==
- 1 January – New Year's Day
- 29 March – Good Friday†
- 31 March – Easter
- 1 April – Easter Monday
- 1 May – International Workers' Day
- 8 May – Victory Day
- 9 May – Ascension Day
- 19 May – Whit Sunday
- 20 May – Whit Monday
- 14 July – Bastille Day
- 15 August – Assumption Day
- 1 November – All Saints' Day
- 11 November – Armistice Day
- 25 December – Christmas Day
- 26 December – Saint Stephen's Day†

†Good Friday and St Stephen's Day are observed in Alsace and Moselle only

== Art and entertainment ==
- List of 2024 box office number-one films in France
- List of French films of 2024
- List of French submissions for the Academy Award for Best International Feature Film

== Deaths ==
=== January ===
- 2 January: Daniel Revenu, 81, fencer, Olympic champion (1968) and five-time bronze medalist.
- 3 January:
  - René Metge, 82, rally driver.
  - Bernard Ducuing, 73, footballer (Red Star, Reims, Montpellier).
  - Frédéric Bluche, 72, legal historian.
- 4 January: Raymond Elena, 92, racing cyclist.
- 5 January:
  - Jean-Marie Rausch, 94, politician, senator (1974–1988, 1992–2001) and mayor of Metz (1971–2008).
  - Bernard Malgrange, 95, mathematician (Malgrange–Ehrenpreis theorem, Malgrange preparation theorem), member of the French Academy of Sciences.
- 8 January: Guy Bonnet, 78, author, composer and singer.
- 9 January:
  - Thierry Desmarest, 78, businessman (TotalEnergies).
  - Jean Céa, 91, mathematician.
- 10 January: Louis Le Pensec, 87, politician, minister of agriculture (1997–1998) and senator (1998–2008).
- 11 January:
  - Laurence Badie, 95, actress (The Virtuous Scoundrel, Woman Times Seven, Bankers Also Have Souls) and comedian.
  - Guy Janvier, 75, politician, member of the general council of Hauts-de-Seine (2004–2015).
  - Jean-Luc Laurent, 66, politician, MP (2012–2017) and mayor of Le Kremlin-Bicêtre (1995–2016, since 2020).
- 13 January:
  - Jean-Jacques Bénètière, 84, politician, member of parliament (1981–1986).
  - Bruno Ducol, 74, pianist and composer.
- 14 January: Christophe Boesch, 72, French-Swiss primatologist.
- 18 January: Slim Pezin, 78, guitarist, arranger and conductor.
- 22 January: Pierre Chassigneux, 82, businessman and government official, president of SANEF (2003–2011).
- 23 January: Jean Petit, 74, football player (Monaco, national team) and manager.
- 26 January:
  - Michel Hausser, 96, jazz vibraphonist.
  - Jean Vaillant, 91, Olympic long-distance runner (1964).
- 27 January: Pierre Montlaur, 60, rugby union player (SU Agen, national team).
- 28 January: Marie-Josèphe Sublet, 87, politician, deputy (1981–1993).
- 29 January:
  - Louis Colombani, 92, politician, deputy (1988–1997).
  - Séverine Foulon, 50, athlete.
  - Iskandar Safa, 68, Lebanese-born French shipbuilding industry executive.
- 30 January: Jean-François Cordet, 73, government official, director of OFPRA (2007–2012).

=== February ===
- 1 February:
  - Michel Jazy, 87, middle-distance runner, Olympic silver medallist (1960).
  - Gilbert Millet, 93, doctor and politician, three-time deputy, mayor of Alès (1985–1989).
- 2 February: Pierre Raffin, 85, Roman Catholic prelate, bishop of Metz (1987–2013).
- 5 February:
  - Brigitte Bout, 83, senator
  - Jean Malaurie, 101, anthropologist and explorer.
- 9 February: Marie-Cécile Morice, 75, mayor
- 13 February : Alain Dorval, 77, French voice actor, he dubbed Sylvester Stallone, from 1976 to 2024

=== March ===
- 22 March: Anne-Marie Trégouët, 99, French veteran.
- 23 March: Daniel Beretta, 77, French voice actor and singer, he dubbed Arnold Schwarzenegger from 1987 to 2021.

=== April ===
- 25 April: Laurent Cantet, 63, film director (Time Out, The Class).

=== June ===
- 5 June: Ben Vautier and Annie Vautier.

=== July ===
- 5 July: Yvonne Furneaux, 98, French-British actress (La dolce vita, The Mummy, Replusion).
- 15 July: Jacques Boudet, 89, actor (La Femme Nikita, Those Happy Days).
- 27 July: Francis Chouat, 75, politician.

=== August ===
- 18 August: Alain Delon, 88, actor (Le Samouraï, Borsalino).
- 29 August: Jean-Charles Tacchella, 98, film director (Cousin Cousine, Seven Sundays).

=== September ===
- 5 September: Laurent Tirard, 57, film director and screenwriter (Little Nicholas, Asterix and Obelix: God Save Britannia).

== See also ==
- History of France
- History of modern France
- Outline of France
- Government of France
- Politics of France
- Years in France
- Timeline of France history
