= 2022 in France =

- Decades: 2000s; 2010s; 2020s; 2030s
- See also: History of France; Timeline of French history; List of years in France

Events in the year 2022 in France.

== Incumbents ==
- President – Emmanuel Macron (REM)
- Prime Minister – Jean Castex (REM) until May 16, Élisabeth Borne (REM) from May 16
- Government – Borne government

== Events ==
Ongoing — COVID-19 pandemic in France

2 March-7 April - 2022 Corsica unrest: Protests and riots break out in Corsica after the prison assault and death of nationalist Yvan Colonna, leading to over 100 injuries and several arson attacks.

=== February ===
- 14 February - Saint-Laurent-de-la-Salanque explosion: An explosion and fire in a building on Rue Arago, Saint-Laurent-de-la-Salanque, kill eight people and injures around thirty. An arson investigation leads to the arrest of three suspects.

=== March ===
- 20 March - Territorial elections are held for the overseas communities of Saint Barthélemy, Saint Martin, Saint Pierre and Miquelon, and the Territorial Assembly of Wallis and Futuna.

=== April ===
- 10 April - The first round of the 2022 French presidential election is held.
- 24 April - The second round of the 2022 French presidential election is held and incumbent president Emmanuel Macron is reelected, defeating Marine Le Pen.

=== May ===
- 16 May - Prime minister Jean Castex resigns and president Macron appoints Minister of Labour, Employment and Economic Inclusion Élisabeth Borne to replace him.

=== June ===
- 12-19 June - 2022 French legislative election: Two-round legislative elections are held; the Ensemble coalition remain the largest bloc but loses absolute majority, resulting in France’s first hung parliament since 1988 and formation of the first minority government since 1993.

=== July ===
- 1-24 July - 2022 Tour de France: Jonas Vingegaard wins the 109th Tour de France, held across Denmark, Belgium, Switzerland, and France. The race included mountain stages, protests, and a heatwave, with Wout van Aert winning the points classification.
- 12 July - 2022 Gironde wildfires: Large wildfires in Gironde burn over 20,800 hectares and force 36,000+ evacuations. Extensive firefighting efforts include thousands of firefighters and international aircraft to protect homes and campsites.

=== August ===
- 12 August - 2022 Gironde wildfires: A renewed wildfire in Gironde burns 7,400 hectares and displaces 10,000 people, with assistance from European firefighters and aerial units.

=== November ===
- 3 November - Far-right MP de Fournas shouts "Go back to Africa!" at black MP Bilongo, sparking uproar and suspension. Prime Minister Borne condemned the racist remark.
- 4 November - The National Assembly suspends Gregoire de Fournas for 15 days and cuts his pay; Emmanuel Macron’s party boycotts sessions pending a strong penalty.
- 5 November - Jordan Bardella is elected president of National Rally, ending Le Pen era as president of the party.

=== December ===
- 11 December - France wins the Junior Eurovision Song Contest 2022 held in Yerevan, Armenia, with the song "Oh Maman !" by Lissandro.
- 23 December - 2022 Paris shooting: A shooter at Kurdish sites in Paris kills three and injured three. The 69-year-old suspect, motivated by racism, is arrested at the scene.

== Deaths ==
=== January ===
- 1 January
  - Roger-Xavier Lantéri, journalist (b. 1930)
  - Pierre Parsus, painter and illustrator (b. 1921)
  - Jean-Charles Terrassier, French psychologist. (b. 1940)
- 3 January
  - Igor Bogdanoff, television presenter and academic fraudster (Bogdanov affair) (b. 1942)
  - Daniel Colliard, French politician, deputy (1993–1997). (b. 1930)
  - Claude Taittinger, businessman, director of Taittinger (b. 1927)
- 5 January – Anatole Novak, road bicycle racer (b. 1937)
- 7 January – José Évrard, politician, deputy (b. 1945)

=== March ===
- 17 March – Jean-Pierre Demailly, mathematician (b. 1957)

=== May ===
- 29 May – Ariel Besse, actress (b. 1965)

=== August ===
- 11 August – Jean-Jacques Sempé, cartoonist (Le Petit Nicolas) (b. 1932)

=== September ===
- 13 September — Jean-Luc Gudard, film director (b. 1930)

== See also ==
=== Country overviews ===
- History of France
- History of modern France
- Outline of France
- Government of France
- Politics of France
- Years in France
- Timeline of France history
- List of French films of 2022

=== Related timelines for current period ===
- 2022
