= Christmas on Earth =

- Directed by: Barbara Rubin
- Edited by: Barbara Rubin
- Distributed by: The Film-Makers' Cooperative
- Release date: 1963
- Running time: 29 minutes
- Country: United States
- Language: Silent

Christmas on Earth is a 1963 American experimental short film directed by Barbara Rubin.

== Description ==
Originally titled Cocks and Cunts, Christmas on Earth features several painted and masked performers (some in black and whiteface) engaging in a variety of gay and straight sexual acts. The film's two separate black-and-white reels are projected simultaneously, one inside the other, with color filters placed on the projector lens, and, originally, an ad hoc soundtrack of contemporary rock radio. Performers included, among others, the underground star Gerard Malanga. (Note: According to Ara Osterweil, Naomi Levine was one of the performers, but Gerard Malanga wrote (in an email dated September 19, 2014) that he didn't remember Levine being there, but rather "a girl named Barbara Gladstone (not to be confused with the gallerist) who was studying modern dance with the Martha Graham School of Dance." She later moved to London and made a film with another expatriate New Yorker, Stephen Dwoskin.)

== Production ==
Rubin, only 18 when she began filming in 1963, (Note: Most sources say Rubin was 17 or 18 when she made the film; she turned 18 in 1963, the year the film is commonly believed to have been made, and her birth date is unknown. Rubin's friend, Rosebud Feliu Pettet, wrote (in an email dated September 21, 2014) that some of the filming for Christmas on Earth was done in 1964, and the final version may not have been completed until early 1965.) shot the film using a borrowed 16mm Bolex camera, in New York City, in the Ludlow Street apartment of John Cale and Tony Conrad. The 29-minute film was inspired by Jack Smith's Flaming Creatures, over which Rubin clashed with censors alongside Jonas Mekas and P. Adams Sitney. Rubin's use of superimposition, and her decision to slice the original footage into "dynamic fragments," may have been influenced by the films of Jerry Jofen and Gregory Markopoulos. Rubin described her editing process as follows:

so I spent 3 months chopping the hours of film up into a basket and then toss and toss, flip and toss and one by one Absently enchantedly Destined to splice it together and separate on to two different reels and then project one reel half the size inside the other reel full screen size.

She worked with Criterion Film Labs in Midtown Manhattan, which was willing to develop the rolls.

The title derives from Arthur Rimbaud's "Morning" from the extended poem A Season in Hell:

When will we go, over mountains and shores, to hail the birth of new labor, new wisdom, the flight of tyrants and demons, the end of superstition, – to be the first to adore! – Christmas on earth!

The film has been described by critics as "among the most radical ever made"; "far and away the most sexually explicit film produced by the pre-porn underground"; and "an essential document of queer and feminist cinema."

== Release ==
Due to its explicit nature, the New York City police tried to suppress the film; for a time during the mid-1960s Rubin habitually carried her one copy around with her for safekeeping. Allen Ginsberg was so impressed by Christmas on Earth he initiated an affair with Rubin after seeing it for the first time. Mekas praised it in Film Culture: "The first shock changes into silence then is transposed into amazement. We have seldom seen such down-to-body beauty, so real as only beauty (man) can be: terrible beauty that man, that woman is..." The film was used in Exploding Plastic Inevitable shows until Velvet Underground drummer Moe Tucker objected.

After only a few screenings in the sixties, Rubin asked Mekas to destroy Christmas on Earth; instead, he shelved it. Years later she had another change of heart. The film's next public screening came in 1983, at the Collective for Living Cinema. Critic J. Hoberman praised it, commenting that "To see Christmas on Earth is to watch history remade." Filmmaker Ken Jacobs dismissed the film as amateurish, calling it "so awful—such an abomination". "Since 1983, it has been screened regularly," wrote Johan Kugelberg, "and is slowly but steadily taking its place in the canon of 1960s underground films and cultural milestones that unraveled American censorship law and opened the field for artistic studies of sexual narratives."

== Bibliography ==
- Hoberman, J. (2025). Everything Is Now: The 1960s New York Avant-Garde—Primal Happenings, Underground Movies, Radical Pop. Verso Books. ISBN 978-1-80429-086-6.
- Osterweil, Ara (2007). "Absently Enchanted: The Apocryphal, Ecstatic Cinema of Barbara Rubin". In Blaetz, Robin (ed.). Women's Experimental Cinema: Critical Frameworks. Duke University Press. ISBN 9780822340447.
- Sanders, Ed (2011). Fug You: An Informal History of the Peace Eye Bookstore, the Fuck You Press, the Fugs, and Counterculture in the Lower East Side. Da Capo Press. ISBN 978-0306818882.
- Siegel, Marc (1997). "Documentary That Dare/Not Speak Its Name: Jack Smith's Flaming Creatures". In Holmlund, Chris; Fuchs, Cynthia (eds.). Between the Sheets, in the Streets: Queer, Lesbian, and Gay Documentary. University of Minnesota Press. ISBN 9781452901312.
