= Forrest Bess =

American painter

- Born: Forrest Clemenger Bess; October 5, 1911; Bay City, Texas
- Died: November 10, 1977 (aged 66); Bay City, Texas
- Occupations: Painter, fisherman
- Years active: 1946–1970
- Known for: Painting
- Movement: Abstract Expressionism

Forrest Clemenger Bess (October 5, 1911 – November 10, 1977) was an American painter and fisherman. He was discovered and promoted by the art dealer Betty Parsons. He is known for his abstract, symbol-laden paintings based on what he called "visions."

== Early life ==
Bess was born on October 5, 1911, in Bay City, Texas to Arnold "Butch" Bess, an oil field worker, and Minta Lee Bess. Bess first experienced the "visions" he would use later in his art as a young child. His first introduction to oil painting were works done by a neighbor, and at thirteen years old he began lessons in painting from another neighbor.

A semi-itinerant childhood was followed by some years at college, where he began by studying architecture, but found himself diverted into religion, psychology, and anthropology, readings that would later inform his own radical theories. Dropping out of university in 1932, Bess worked for several years roughnecking in the Beaumont oil fields, and also made several trips to Mexico, where he saw the work of muralists Diego Rivera and David Alfaro Siqueiros. He returned to Bay City in 1934 to establish a painting studio.

During World War II, he enlisted in the Army Corps of Engineers and was given the task of designing camouflage. However, he was later moved to MacDill Air Force Base at Tampa, Florida, to teach bricklaying. He suffered a psychological breakdown, took a leave of absence, and then transferred to teaching painting at a convalescent hospital.

After living and painting for a while in San Antonio, he finally settled at his family's fishing camp at Chinquapin, near Bay City.

== Painting ==
He worked as a commercial fisherman, but painted in his spare time. He experienced visions or dreams, which he set down in his paintings. He began to exhibit his works, earning one-person shows at museums in San Antonio and Houston. On a trip to New York to find an art dealer, he met Betty Parsons who agreed to represent him. During his most creative period, 1949 through 1967, Betty Parsons arranged six solo exhibitions at her New York City gallery.

Bess's paintings are generally small and abstract. They incorporate symbols that Bess felt could bring him and others to a different state of consciousness.

== Philosophy ==
In the 1950s, he also began a lifelong correspondence with art professor and author Meyer Schapiro and sexologist John Money. In these and other letters (which were donated to the Smithsonian Archives of American Art), Bess makes it clear that his paintings were only part of a grander theory, based on alchemy, the philosophy of Carl Jung, and the rituals of Australian aborigines, which proposed that becoming a hermaphrodite was the key to immortality. He was never able to win any converts to his theories or validation from the many doctors and psychologists with whom he corresponded. In his own home town of Bay City, he was considered something of a small-town eccentric.

== Surgery ==
The events of the night in 1955 or the "late 1950s" on which Forrest Bess became a pseudo-hermaphrodite are not clear. According to Bess, he paid a local physician, Dr. R. H. Jackson, $100 and several paintings to perform the necessary surgery. Sex researcher Dr. John Money later corresponded at length with Bess and concluded that Bess, who exhibited an extensive knowledge of anatomy, medical procedures and painkilling drugs, had operated on himself and invented the doctor's participation to legitimize his experiment. The doctor apparently did attend Bess on the night in question. Jackson died shortly after supposedly performing a second operation on Bess in late 1961.

The anatomical facts, however, are clear. In accordance with the aborigine ritual, an opening or fistula was created beneath Bess's penis at its junction with the scrotum. This opening led through an incision in the urethra to the bulbocavernous urethra, a naturally enlarged section of the urethra that Bess insisted was capable of intense orgasmic stimulation. According to Bess's theories, the bulbous section of the urethra could, if sufficiently dilated, receive another penis in what would be the ultimate, eternally rejuvenating form of sexual intercourse. This physical manifestation of his theory never achieved the results he had hoped for and this quest for immortality was the beginning of a slow decline in both his health and his creative output.

== Death ==
Forrest Bess died on November 11, 1977, in a Bay City, Texas nursing home from a stroke at the age of 66.

== Legacy ==
In the years following his death, Bess was nearly forgotten to history, but a 1981 solo show curated by Barbara Haskell at the Whitney Museum of Art helped revive his reputation as an artist. In the catalog, Haskell wrote, "Indeed, this painter's direct, almost primitive images, loaded with symbolic meaning and emotional content, are finding echoes in the so-called New Image painters. It may be that the show at the Whitney is the first step toward readdressing the import of his work." Bess's legacy was further enhanced in 1988, when Hirschl & Adler Modern exhibited 61 of his works.

In 1999, an award-winning 48 minute documentary film, Forrest Bess: Key to the Riddle, was produced by Chuck Smith and directed by Chuck Smith and Ari Marcopoulos. The film features interviews with Meyer Schapiro, Robert Thurman, and other friends and artists who knew Bess. In 2013, Smith turned the film into a book, Forrest Bess: Key to the Riddle, published by powerHouse Books. The book features a foreword by Robert Thurman.

As part of the 2012 Whitney Biennial, sculptor Robert Gober curated an exhibition of Bess' paintings from the late 1950s, as well as archival material.

In 2013 and 2014, the museum retrospective "Forrest Bess: Seeing Things Invisible" exhibited nearly 50 of his paintings and was curated by Clare Elliott, assistant curator of the Menil Collection.

Bess is often characterized as an artist outside established schools or movements, known for a highly personal artistic vision. His body of work includes approximately 100 small paintings, many displayed in simple driftwood frames that he built himself. The majority of these paintings are held in private collections.

Museums with works by Bess include the Menil Collection, Houston; the Museum of Contemporary Art Chicago; the City by the Sea Museum in Palacios, Texas; the Museum of Modern Art and the Whitney Museum of American Art in New York; the Phillips Collection in Washington, D.C.; and the San Francisco Museum of Modern Art.
