= Pierre Chassigneux =

French businessman and government official (1941–2024)

President of the Société des Autoroutes du Nord et de l'Est de la France
- In office 2003–2011
- Preceded by: Pierre Chantereau
- Succeeded by: Alain Minc

Director of the Office of the President of the French Republic
- In office 2 July 1992 – 19 May 1995
- President: François Mitterrand
- Preceded by: Gilles Ménage
- Succeeded by: Bertrand Landrieu

Prefect of Gironde
- In office 21 December 1988 – 1 July 1992
- Preceded by: Thierry Kaeppelin
- Succeeded by: Bernard Landouzy

Prefect of Oise
- In office 2 May 1986 – 21 December 1988
- Preceded by: Louis Morel
- Succeeded by: Alain Bidou

Director of the Direction centrale des renseignements généraux
- In office 16 November 1983 – 2 May 1986
- Preceded by: Paul Roux
- Succeeded by: Philippe Massoni

Prefect of Nièvre
- In office 13 April 1982 – 16 November 1983
- Preceded by: Victor Béreaux
- Succeeded by: Mohamed Bengaouer

Personal details
- Born: Pierre Claude Georges Chassigneux; 25 December 1941 Neuilly-sur-Marne, German-occupied France
- Died: 22 January 2024 (aged 82)
- Education: Lycée Louis-le-Grand; École nationale d'administration Sciences Po; Faculty of Law of Paris
- Occupation: Businessman; Government official

Pierre Claude Georges Chassigneux (French pronunciation: [pjɛʁ klod ʒɔʁʒ ʃasiɲø]; 25 December 1941 – 22 January 2024) was a French businessman and government official.

== Biography ==
Born in Neuilly-sur-Marne on 25 December 1941, Chassigneux's parents were doctors. He attended secondary school at the Lycée Marcelin-Berthelot and the Lycée Louis-le-Grand before graduating from the Faculty of Law of Paris, Sciences Po, and the École nationale d'administration. After university, he joined the Ministry of the Interior in 1969 and became chief of staff to Prefect of TarnBernard Couzier.

Chassigneux was appointed secretary-general of Orne in 1976 and then Manche the following year. He became deputy chief of staff to Prefect of Police Pierre Somveille in 1980. He served as Prefect of Nièvre from 1982 to 1983, directed the Direction centrale des renseignements généraux from 1983 to 1986, served as Prefect of Oise from 1986 to 1988, and was Prefect of Gironde from 1988 to 1992. From 1992 to 1995, he was Director of the Office of the President of the French Republic under François Mitterrand.

After Mitterrand left the Élysée Palace in 1995, Chassigneux served as president of the Association technique de l'importation charbonnière until 2001. There, he supervised the privatization of the Compagnie française de navigation rhénane. He joined the board of directors of Aéroports de Paris the day after the September 11 attacks with the objective of strengthening airport security. In 2003, he became president of the Société des Autoroutes du Nord et de l'Est de la France (SANEF), succeeding Pierre Chantereau. He was also vice-president of the Association des sociétés françaises d'autoroutes et d'ouvrages à péages and treasurer of the Institut François-Mitterrand. In 2007, he became president of Taxis bleus, owned by his old acquaintance André Rousselet. In December 2011, he ended his mandate as president of SANEF. As president of Taxis bleus, he fought against the rise of the vehicle for hire industry during the 2010s.

Pierre Chassigneux died on 22 January 2024, at the age of 82.
