= SANEF =

SANEF may refer to:

- Société des Autoroutes du Nord et de l'Est de la France, French motorway operator.
- South African National Editors' Forum, professional journalist membership organisation.
