= Barbara Rubin =

American filmmaker (1945–1980)

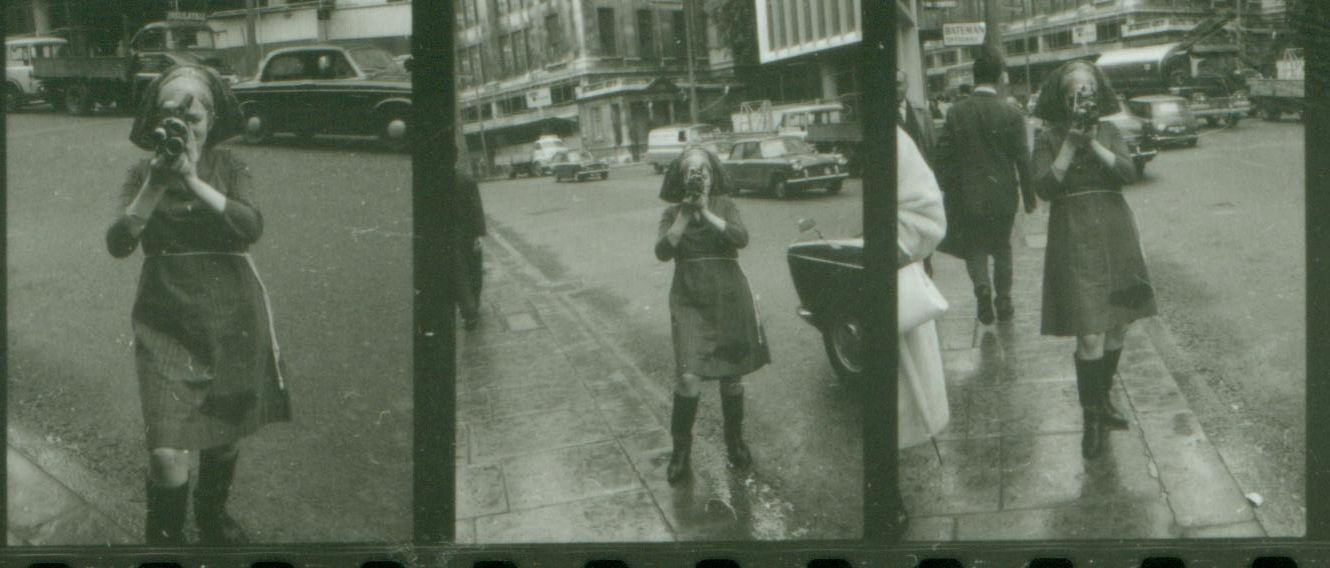
- Barbara Rubin, London, May 1965, by Allen Ginsberg (copyright Peter Hale)
- Born: 8 June 1945; New York City, New York, U.S.
- Died: 17 September 1980 (aged 35); Lyon, France
- Occupation: Filmmaker
- Known for: Christmas on Earth
- Spouse: Mordechai Levy (m. 1971–1972) Israël Isaac Besançon (m. 1973)

Barbara Rubin (1945–1980) was an American experimental filmmaker and performance artist. She is best known for her landmark 1963 underground film Christmas on Earth. She frequently collaborated with other well-known artists in the underground movement. Rubin's filmography is often described as "radical" and "controversial". She was one of the first recognized female filmmakers of this movement. She is frequently cited as being the individual who introduced Andy Warhol to the American rock band The Velvet Underground.

== Life and career ==
Barbara Rubin grew up in the Cambria Heights neighborhood of Queens, New York City. At an early age she developed "weight problems" and began self medicating with diet pills, which resulted in her parents sending Rubin to a mental hospital, from which she was released in the spring of 1963. Shortly thereafter, she was hired by Jonas Mekas to work for the Film-Makers' Cooperative, a non-profit organization co-founded by several artists to distribute avant-garde films. The cooperative was frequented by many notable artists, including Robert Frank, Allen Ginsberg, Salvador Dalí, Ron Rice, Jerry Jofen, Jack Smith, and Andy Warhol. Rubin soon became indispensable to Mekas, organizing local and international events. "Her contributions are so many and different," Mekas said in 2003. "....Her life story still has to be written because she was very, I think, important." In her teenage years, she became a notable figure in the underground film scene. Despite her well known cult-film Christmas on Earth and her contributions to the underground film movement, she has been described as "one of the least appreciated" filmmakers of the time.

Rubin's work and films have been compared to that of Carolee Schneemann's. Her activity and work completed between 1963 and 1968 is sparsely documented and much of what is known about her is due to publications by and/or about those she was friends or collaborating with. Her most well-documented period is that of her role at Andy Warhol's original factory.

=== Final years ===
By the early 1970s, Rubin was twice married. The first marriage, to Mordechai Levy, was an arranged one and ended in divorce. The second was to Israël Isaac Besançon, a French painter and follower of the mystical teachings of Rabbi Nachman of Bratslav. Rubin and Besançon first lived in Crown Heights, Brooklyn, in a small community of newly-observant artists that included filmmaker and collagist Jerry Jofen and his wife, Ellen Gordon. Rubin later moved with her husband to a religious community in the South of France in 1973. She died of a postnatal infection in France in 1980 after giving birth to her fifth child. She was 35.

== Filmmaking and screening processes ==
After filming the footage of Christmas on Earth, Rubin developed the film, then cut it into strips, placed them into a basket, and drew them out at random, then spliced these individual shots into a seemingly random order. After this process was complete, and after much consideration, Rubin cut the film into two separate reels which were to be screened over top of one another by having one projector displaying its own reel. She determined that in screening this film that the first projectors image take up the entirety of the screen, and that the other's be "approximately 1/3 smaller, [filling] only the middle of the screen". A live radio soundtrack, ideally one of rock music, was also intended to accompany screenings of Christmas on Earth. Furthermore, Rubin dictated that the projectionist have the ability to alter the film by placing gels of various colours in front of the projector lens, and by turning the radio on and off at random. Because of these processes there is no logical sequentiality nor is there a coherent plot. Rubin described Christmas on Earth, in a note to a projectionist found in a film can, as having "neither head nor tail".

Rubin attempted to once again use this "double-exposure" technique at a meeting of well-known Beat poets, (the International Poetry Incarnation) such as her colleague Allen Ginsberg, but she was told that it was unlikely to present the evening as intended. Because of this, she did not film the event at all.

For another, undated project, Untitled or 5347 Rubin shot three minutes worth of film, which she exposed the negative of twice, then re-used the film by feeding it back into her camera and shooting once more.

=== Christmas on Earth ===
Originally titled Cocks and Cunts, Christmas on Earth features several painted and masked performers engaging in a variety of gay and straight sexual acts. The film's two separate black-and-white reels are projected simultaneously, one inside the other, with color filters placed on the projector lens, and, originally, an ad hoc soundtrack of contemporary rock radio. Performers included, among others, the underground star Gerard Malanga. The short film was inspired by Jack Smith's Flaming Creatures, over which Rubin clashed with censors alongside Mekas and P. Adams Sitney. Rubin's use of superimposition, and her decision to slice the original footage into "dynamic fragments," may have been influenced by the films of Jerry Jofen and Gregory Markopoulos.

Rubin, only 18 when she began filming in 1963, (Note: Most sources say Rubin was 17 or 18 when she made the film; she turned 18 in 1963, the year the film is commonly believed to have been made, and her birth date is unknown. Rubin's friend, Rosebud Feliu Pettet, wrote (in an email dated September 21, 2014) that some of the filming for Christmas on Earth was done in 1964, and the final version may not have been completed until early 1965.) shot the film using a borrowed 16mm Bolex camera, in New York City, in the Ludlow Street apartment of John Cale and Tony Conrad. The title derives from Arthur Rimbaud's "Morning" from the extended poem A Season in Hell. It has been reported that Rubin originally intended to make a film focused on the hysteria she witnessed during her stay at a mental hospital, at which she was being treated for amphetamine abuse and "emotional problems".

The film has been described by critics as "among the most radical ever made"; "far and away the most sexually explicit film produced by the pre-porn underground"; and "an essential document of queer and feminist cinema."

Due to its explicit nature, the New York City police tried to suppress the film; for a time during the mid-1960s Rubin habitually carried her one copy around with her for safekeeping. Allen Ginsberg was so impressed by Christmas on Earth he initiated an affair with Rubin after seeing it for the first time. Jonas Mekas praised it in Film Culture: "The first shock changes into silence then is transposed into amazement. We have seldom seen such down-to-body beauty, so real as only beauty (man) can be: terrible beauty that man, that woman is..." Others have dismissed the film as amateurish, and filmmaker Ken Jacobs called it "dreck."

After only a few screenings in the sixties, Rubin asked Mekas to destroy the film; instead, he shelved it. Years later she had another change of heart and gave him permission to screen it. "Since 1983, it has been screened regularly," wrote Johan Kugelberg, "and is slowly but steadily taking its place in the canon of 1960s underground films and cultural milestones that unraveled American censorship law and opened the field for artistic studies of sexual narratives."

=== Collaboration with Andy Warhol ===
Rubin, according to Andy Warhol, "was one of the first people to get multimedia interest going around New York." Although young, she had been working with Mekas for some time when she met Warhol, and brought ideas and experience to their collaboration. Christopher Mele wrote, "Experimental filmmakers Barbara Rubin and Andy Warhol utilized technologies such as multiple screens, slides, and projectors, and integrated other media, such as sculpture, music, and lighting to create a total experience that varied each night."

In 1965 Rubin was the subject of one of Warhol's Screen Tests (filmed by Gerard Malanga). That same year she appeared in Piero Heliczer's underground film, Dirt, with Warhol, Edie Sedgwick, and others. She also appeared in Heliczer's Venus in Furs, along with the Velvet Underground, and was included in a CBS news segment about the film titled "The Making of an Underground Film." More famously, it was Rubin who first introduced the Velvet Underground to Warhol, through Malanga, in December 1965. (Note: According to Gerard Malanga, the Bockris book's account of the introduction gets a few details wrong in regard to who was present in the Café Bizarre on which night. Also, according to Rosebud Pettet, Rubin made the introduction at Pettet's urging. All the sources seem to agree on one thing, however: It was Barbara Rubin who arranged the introduction.)

A few weeks later, Rubin took part in a headline-making Warhol performance at a psychiatrists' convention:

On January 13, 1966, Warhol was invited to be the evening's entertainment at the NY Society for Clinical Psychiatry's forty-third annual dinner, held at Delmonico's Hotel. Bursting into the room with a camera, as the Velvet Underground acoustically tortured the guests and Gerard Malanga and Edie Sedgwick performed the "whip dance" in the background, Rubin taunted the attending psychiatrists. Casting blinding lights in their faces, Rubin hurled derogatory questions at the esteemed members of the medical profession, including: "What does her vagina feel like? Is his penis big enough? Do you eat her out?" As the horrified guests began to leave, Rubin continued her interrogation: "Why are you getting embarrassed? You're a psychiatrist; you're not supposed to get embarrassed." The following day the NY Times reported on the event; their chosen headline, "Shock treatment for psychiatrists," reveals the extent to which Rubin's guerrilla tactics had inverted the sanctioned relationship between patient and doctor, expert and amateur.

—Ara Osterweil

Later that year Rubin, dressed as a nun, projected Christmas on Earth onto the performing Velvet Underground as part of Andy Warhol Up-Tight and the Exploding Plastic Inevitable multimedia performances, accompanying the EPI on the road.

=== Other work ===
More than just a filmmaker, Rubin was known for her dynamic personality and her knack for artistic matchmaking. It was Rubin who organized the International Poetry Incarnation at the Albert Hall in London in 1965 and in 1967 persuaded Allen Ginsberg to buy the East Hill Farm as a haven for poets. She helped nurse her friend Bob Dylan back to health after his motorcycle accident in 1966, and appears on the back cover of his album Bringing It All Back Home. She organized a two-week multimedia festival, "Caterpillar Changes," at the Filmmakers Cinematheque in 1967, in which films by Harry Smith, Shirley Clarke, Storm de Hirsch and others were projected onto torn sheets and through hanging streamers. "Barbara was the moving force and coordinator between us all," Lou Reed said in a 2012 interview. (Note: According to the Boo-Hooray gallery (in an email dated September 8, 2014), "That quote was delivered directly to Johan Kugelberg by Lou Reed over the telephone. Our publication is its first appearance in print.") Ed Sanders, in his review of Gordon Ball's memoir, 66 Frames, called her "the legendary Barbara Rubin, who wandered the era pollinating across the film, poetry, folk-rock, and peacemaking scenes."

Rubin's 1972 film Emunah was filmed after Rubin's conversion to Hasidism. The film features Ginsberg and was shot in London and New York. Jonas Mekas explained that it "is structured around the fate and meaning of the Jew. It's also about Naomi (of Kaddish), and Allen, and all the great rabbis of the world."

== Filmography ==
Directed:

- Christmas on Earth (1963)
- Emunah (1972)

Appears in:

- Chumlum (Ron Rice, 1963)
- Dirt (Piero Heliczer, 1965)
- Venus in Furs (Piero Heliczer, 1965)
- Screen Test (Andy Warhol, 1965)
- Walden (Jonas Mekas, 1969)
- Birth of a Nation (Jonas Mekas, 1997)
- To Barbara Rubin with Love (Jonas Mekas, 2007)
- Scenes from the Life of Andy Warhol 1963–1990 (Jonas Mekas, 1982)

Barbara Rubin and the Exploding NY Underground, a biographical documentary about Rubin directed by Chuck Smith, was released in 2018.
