= 2027 in France =

- Decades: 2000s; 2010s; 2020s; 2030s
- See also: History of France; Timeline of French history; List of years in France

Events in the year 2027 in France.

== Events ==
=== Predicted and scheduled events ===
- 18 April – 2027 French presidential election
- TBA – 2027 UCI Road World Championships in Haute-Savoie

== Holidays ==
- 1 January – New Year's Day
- 26 March – Good Friday†
- 28 March – Easter
- 29 March – Easter Monday
- 1 May – International Workers' Day
- 6 May – Ascension Day
- 8 May – Victory Day
- 16 May – Whit Sunday
- 17 May – Whit Monday
- 14 July – Bastille Day
- 15 August – Assumption Day
- 1 November – All Saints' Day
- 11 November – Armistice Day
- 25 December – Christmas Day
- 26 December – Saint Stephen's Day†

†Good Friday and St Stephen's Day are observed in Alsace and Moselle only

== See also ==
=== Country overviews ===
- History of France
- History of modern France
- Outline of France
- Government of France
- Politics of France
- Years in France
- Timeline of France history
