= Chuck Smith (filmmaker) =

Chuck Smith is a New York-based documentary filmmaker, television producer and author.

He created a 48-minute film Forrest Bess: Key to the Riddle in 1999 about the artist Forrest Bess. It featured Willem Dafoe as the voice of Bess and was co-directed by Ari Marcopoulos.

His 2018 film Barbara Rubin & the Exploding NY Underground was a biographical documentary about the 1960s experimental filmmaker and scene-maker Barbara Rubin. The film won the 2018 Metropolis Competition at the DOC NYC film festival.

Smith's publications include a Forrest Bess book that was published by powerHouse Books in 2013 with a Foreword by Robert Thurman, and Film Culture 80: The Legend of Barbara Rubin (2019) co-edited with Jonas Mekas and published by Spector Books.
