= Lucien Lazare =

French-Israeli history teacher and Resistance fighter (1924–2026)

- לוסיאן לזר
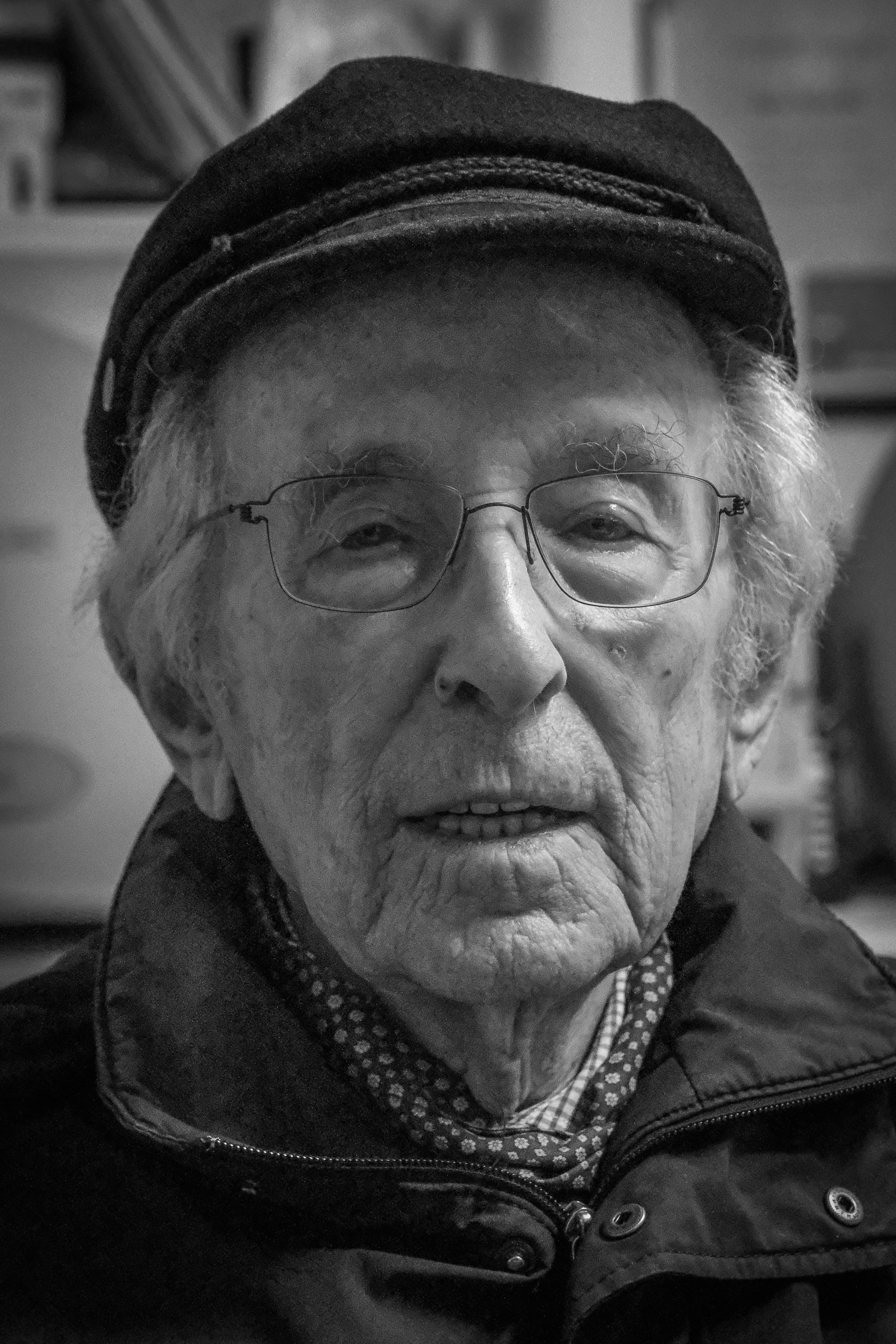
- Lazare in 2019
- Born: 24 November 1924; Strasbourg, France
- Died: 22 September 2026 (aged 101); Jerusalem, Israel
- Education: Yeshiva of Aix-les-Bains; University of Strasbourg
- Occupation: History teacher

Lucien Lazare (Hebrew: לוסיאן לזר; 24 November 1924 – 22 September 2026) was a French-Israeli history teacher and French Resistance fighter.

Alongside Simone Veil, he fought to have the Righteous Among the Nations honored at the Panthéon.

== Biography ==
Born in Strasbourg on 24 November 1924, Lazare attended secondary school in Lyon during the German occupation. He was a member of the Éclaireurs Israélites de France and joined the French Resistance under Marc Haguenau. He then studied at the Yeshiva of Aix-les-Bains before returning to his hometown and marrying psychologist Janine Hemmendinger in 1949. In 1957, he became editor-in-chief of the magazine Hamoré. After becoming secretary of the Communauté israélite de Strasbourg, he earned his doctorate in history from the University of Strasbourg. In 1968, he moved his family to Israel, where he founded the Lycée René-Cassin in Jerusalem. There, his left-wing views led him to become active in the non-violence movement. After supporting positions of his son-in-law Avraham Burg and translating these views into French for Le Monde, he was boycotted by much of the Jewish Israeli community.

Lucien Lazare died in Jerusalem on 22 September 2026, at the age of 101.

== Honors and awards ==
- Knight of the Order of Legion of Honour
- Knight of the Ordre des Palmes Académiques

== Publications ==
- La Résistance juive en France (1987)
- L’abbé Glasberg (1990)
- Le Livre des Justes (1993)
- La Résistance juive, un combat pour la survie (2000)
- Dictionnaire des Justes de France (2003)
- Organisation juive de combat. France 1940–1945 (2006)
- Le tapissier de Jérusalem (2015)
- The Mission of Abbé Glasberg in the French Resistance during WWII (2016)
