= Israël Isaac Besançon =

French-Israeli rabbi (1944–2026)

- ישראל יצחק בזנסון
- Besançon (right) in 2013
- Born: 27 December 1944; Nice, France
- Died: 6 September 2026 (aged 81); Israel
- Education: Yeshiva of Aix-les-Bains
- Occupation: Rabbi

Israël Isaac Besançon (Hebrew: ישראל יצחק בזנסון; 27 December 1944 – 6 September 2026) was a French-Israeli rabbi and painter.

== Biography ==
Born in Nice on 27 December 1944, Besançon showed an interest in painting and studying the Torah in his youth. He studied at several Jewish institutions in Europe, including in Antwerp and Lucerne. After he graduated from the Yeshiva of Aix-les-Bains, he married filmmaker Barbara Rubin in New York City. Rubin died in 1980 due to complications following the birth of their fifth child. A few months later, he married Déborah Shapiro, with whom he had one child. Shapiro died in 2023. In 1994, he moved to Tel Aviv and began following the teachings of Nachman of Breslov. He particularly studied the Likutei Moharan and Rabbi Abraham Ben Nahman. In 1997, he published a collection of paintings titled Tel Yitzchak.

Israël Isaac Besançon died on 6 September 2026, at the age of 81.
