= Cléon derailment =

2026 railway accident in Cléon, France

- The train involved was formed of Class X 76500 diesel multiple units, similar to these.

Details
- Date: 11 September 2026; ~19:25 CEST (17:25 UTC)
- Location: Cléon, Seine-Maritime
- Coordinates: 49°18′36″N 1°03′07″E
- Country: France
- Operator: TER - Nomad Train
- Service: Rouen - Caen
- Incident type: Derailment
- Cause: Suspected sabotage

Statistics
- Trains: 1
- Passengers: 186
- Injured: 44 (1 critical)

On 11 September 2026, a passenger train derailed at Cléon, Seine-Maritime, France. Forty-four people were injured. The cause is suspected to be sabotage.

== Derailment ==
At about 19:25 CEST (16:25 UTC) on 11 September 2026, a passenger train from Rouen to Caen derailed at Cléon, Seine-Maritime, France. The train was formed of two SNCF X 76500 diesel multiple units, 76577 and 76578. One carriage was reported to have overturned and four more were derailed. Of the 186 passengers on board, 44 were injured, one critically. The train was operated by TER. It was reported to have struck an object on the line before it derailed.

The local authorities, notability the President of the Regional Council of Normandy, Hervé Morin, announced that the suspected object that it struck was a suspected 300 kilograms (660 lb) piece of rail. Hervé Morin in an interview with French newspaper Ouest-France said that the metal bar did not end up on the rails "by accident".

== Aftermath ==
Authorities activated a major casualty response plan. More than 140 emergency service workers were dispatched to the scene. SNCF stated that there was major disruption in the area and buses would replace trains. The lines between Rouen and Caen, and between Caen and Le Havre were closed. The train driver was tested for drugs and alcohol after the crash. The results were negative. Police stated that sabotage was suspected to be the cause of the derailment.

== Investigation ==
The Bureau d'Enquêtes sur les Accidents de Transport Terrestre is responsible for investigating rail accidents in France. They opened an investigation into the derailment.
