= Jerry Jofen =

American painter (1925–1993)

- Born: Zalman Jofen; 1925; Białystok, Poland
- Died: 1993 (aged 67–68); New York City, United States
- Occupations: painter, collagist, filmmaker
- Spouse: Ellen

Jerry Jofen (1925–1993) was an American painter, collagist and experimental filmmaker.

== Life and career ==
Zalman "Jerry" Jofen was born in Białystok, Poland, to a scholarly rabbinical family. In 1941 he fled with his family to the United States to escape the Nazis, arriving in San Francisco on the last refugee ship from Japan. Later he moved to New York City, where he spent much of his time in Greenwich Village. Starting out as a painter, he began to explore film and other media in the 1960s. Jofen is best known for his part in the New York underground film scene, where he collaborated with artists such as Jack Smith, Ken Jacobs, and Angus MacLise. Few of his films survive, mainly because he had a habit of destroying them or leaving them unfinished. Nevertheless he was a noted experimental filmmaker in his day, making innovative use of superimposition and other techniques, and influencing other artists such as Andy Warhol, Stan Brakhage, Ron Rice, and Barbara Rubin.

In 1965 Jofen's work was included in the New Cinema Festival (also known as the Expanded Cinema Festival), an extensive series of multimedia productions in New York presented by Jonas Mekas and featuring the work of such artists as Robert Rauschenberg and Claes Oldenburg. Mekas was impressed with Jofen, writing in the Village Voice, "The first three programs of the New Cinema Festival – the work of Angus McLise [sic], Nam June Paik, and Jerry Joffen [sic] – dissolved the edges of this art called cinema into a frontiersland mystery." Jofen's entry also made a lasting impression on the playwright Richard Foreman, who recalled it years later as one of his favorites.

Jofen's films include, among others:

- Voyage (ca. 1962), with Ron Rice, Joel Markman, et al. and music by Angus MacLise.
- How Can You Tell the Dancer from the Dance (c. 1968), a "psychedelic portrait of a night in the city."
- We're Getting On (c. 1973) with Jack Smith
- Rituals and Demonstrations (1977), a documentary about Jewish religious rituals in 1970s Brooklyn.

He also appears in Jonas Mekas's Film Magazine of the Arts (1963) and Birth of a Nation (1997).

Jofen's technique has been described as "collage-like," and in fact he has also been recognized as a gifted collagist, his work often compared to that of Kurt Schwitters. Rarely shown during his lifetime, Jofen's collages began attracting more attention after a 1997 showing curated by Klaus Kertess, who wrote, "Jerry Jofen was a migrant in search of light. Collage formed his art and his life. Makeshift procedures and the dispersal of the found and discarded in restless search for coherence, so often endemic to collage, parallel the make-do strategies, vagaries and serendipity of immigrant life."

Jofen's films have been screened at the Museum of Modern Art, the Jewish Museum, the Whitney Museum of American Art, and, more recently, the Anthology Film Archives. His collages are exhibited regularly at the Pavel Zoubek Gallery in New York.

== See also ==
- New American Cinema
