= Gilbert Millet =

French doctor and politician (1930–2024)

Deputy of the French National Assembly for Gard's 4th constituency
- In office 23 June 1988 – 1 April 1993
- Preceded by: Alain Journet (1986) proportional representation
- Succeeded by: Max Roustan
- In office 2 April 1973 – 22 May 1981
- Preceded by: Pierre Jalu
- Succeeded by: Alain Journet
- In office 3 April 1967 – 30 May 1968
- Preceded by: Paul Béchard
- Succeeded by: Pierre Jalu

Mayor of Alès
- In office 1985–1989
- Preceded by: Roger Roucaute
- Succeeded by: Alain Fabre

Personal details
- Born: 27 December 1930 Paris, France
- Died: 1 February 2024 (aged 93) Saint-Leu-la-Forêt, France
- Party: PCF
- Occupation: Doctor

Gilbert Millet (27 December 1930 – 1 February 2024) was a French physician and politician of the French Communist Party (PCF).

== Biography ==
Born on 27 December 1930 in Paris, Millet moved to the commune of Le Vigan in the Gard department to set up his general partitioner's office. He then joined the PCF. He was first elected as a deputy of the National Assembly in 1967 for a mandate lasting just over a year, in which he represented Gard's 4th constituency. He was elected for a second time in 1973, defeating Robert Verdier of the Socialist Party and Pierre Jalu of the Union of Democrats for the Republic. In 1978, he formed an alliance with Fernand Balez, Mayor of Saint-Christol-lès-Alès.

Millet was defeated by socialist Alain Journet in 1981 and subsequently joined the cabinet of Minister of Health Jack Ralite. He was then elected back into the National Assembly for a third term in 1988. He also served as mayor of Alès from 1985 to 1989.

Married to Marie-Thérèse Delaby, Millet had one daughter. He died in Saint-Leu-la-Forêt on 1 February 2024, at the age of 93.
