= Jean-François Cordet =

French government official (1950–2024)

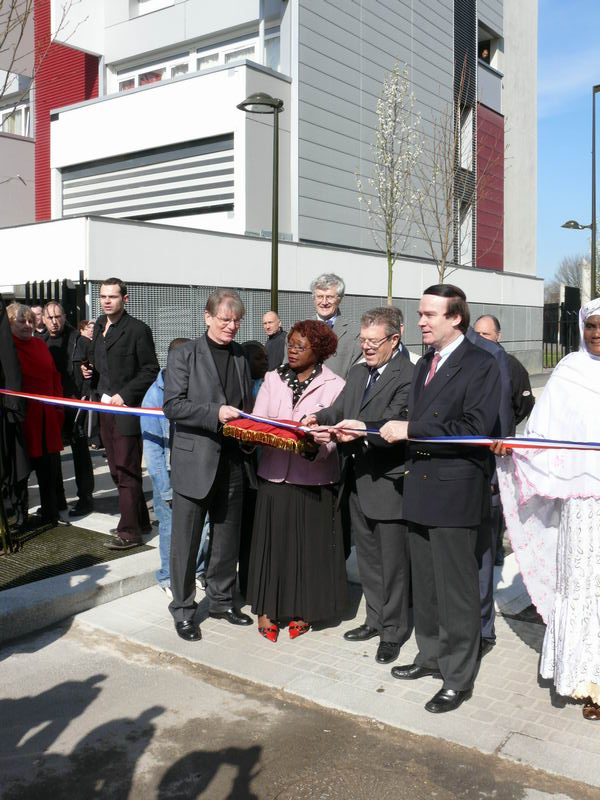
- Cordet (right) in 2007

Prefect of Nord
- In office 31 July 2014 – 26 February 2016
- Preceded by: Dominique Bur
- Succeeded by: Michel Lalande

Prefect of Somme
- In office 1 August 2012 – 31 July 2014
- Preceded by: Michel Delpuech
- Succeeded by: Nicole Klein

Director of OFPRA
- In office 9 July 2007 – 1 August 2012
- Preceded by: Jean-Loup Kuhn-Delforge
- Succeeded by: Pascal Brice

Prefect of Seine-Saint-Denis
- In office 20 November 2004 – 9 July 2007
- Preceded by: Michel Sappin
- Succeeded by: Claude Baland

Prefect of Meurthe-et-Moselle
- In office 1 August 2000 – 20 November 2004
- Preceded by: Jean-François Denis
- Succeeded by: Claude Baland

Prefect of Aisne
- In office 15 July 1998 – 1 August 2000
- Preceded by: Jean-Marc Rebière
- Succeeded by: Didier Lallement

Prefect of Martinique
- In office 28 November 1994 – 15 July 1998
- Preceded by: Michel Morin
- Succeeded by: Michel Morin

Prefect of French Guiana
- In office 11 May 1992 – 28 November 1994
- Preceded by: Jean-François Di Chiara
- Succeeded by: Pierre Dartout

Personal details
- Born: 4 May 1950 Hanoi, Tonkin, French Indochina
- Died: 1 February 2024 (aged 73)
- Education: École nationale d'administration Sciences Po
- Occupation: Government official

Jean-François Cordet (4 May 1950 – 1 February 2024) was a French government official.

Cordet served as prefect of multiple French departments and directed OFPRA from 2007 to 2012.

== Biography ==
Born in Hanoi on 4 May 1950, Cordet's father was a military officer. He graduated from the Sciences Po and the École nationale d'administration and subsequently led the economic affairs and planning office for the overseas territories and New Caledonia. He was technical advisor for the cabinet of Henri Emmanuelli from 1981 to 1982 and deputy chief of staff for Christian Nucci from 1983 to 1984. He was deputy cabinet director for Olivier Stirn before his appointment as Prefect of French Guiana in 1992, serving until 1994. Next, he was Prefect of Martinique from 1994 to 1998 and Prefect of Aisne from 1998 to 2000. He then served as Prefect of Meurthe-et-Moselle from 2000 to 2004 and Prefect of Seine-Saint-Denis from 2004 to 2007.

Cordet was appointed Director of OFPRA in 2007, serving until 2012. After serving as Prefect of Somme from 2012 to 2014, he was Prefect of Nord from 2014 to 2016. That year, he joined the Cour des Comptes as a master advisor of extraordinary service. In March 2017, he was appointed president of the Observatoire national de la politique de la ville, succeeding Jean Daubigny. He also led an interministerial mission to French Guiana.

Cordet died on 1 February 2024, at the age of 73.

== Decorations ==
- Commander of the Legion of Honour (2015)
  - Knight (1997)
  - Officer (2008)
- Commander of the Ordre national du Mérite (2013)
  - Officer (2001)
- Officer of the Ordre des Palmes académiques
- Knight of the Ordre du Mérite agricole
- Knight of the Ordre des Arts et des Lettres
- Gold Medal of Youth, Sports and Community Involvement
- Gold Médaille d'honneur de l'administration pénitentiaire

== Awards ==
- Orwell Award (2013)
