= Philippe Josse =

French civil servant (1960–2026)

President of the Finances Section of the Conseil d'État
- In office 14 February 2024 – 19 July 2026
- Preceded by: Catherine Bergeal

Directeur du Budget
- In office 30 March 2006 – 29 April 2011
- Preceded by: Pierre-Mathieu Duhamel
- Succeeded by: Julien Dubertret

Personal details
- Born: 23 September 1960 Saintes, France
- Died: 19 July 2026 (aged 65)
- Education: Sciences Po; Paris-Panthéon-Assas University (DEA); École nationale d'administration
- Occupation: Civil servant

Philippe Josse (French: [filˈip ʒˈɔs]; 23 September 1960 – 19 July 2026) was a French civil servant.

== Life and career ==
Born in Saintes, Josse was the son of polytechnician Paul Josse and the grandson of civil servant Pierre Josse. A graduate of the Sciences Po and Paris-Panthéon-Assas University, he went on to complete his training at the École nationale d'administration before serving as Secretary-General of STIF from 2000 to 2002. He was deputy cabinet director for Ministers of Budget Alain Lambert and Jean-Louis Borloo before serving as cabinet director for Jean-François Copé from 2004 to 2006. From 2006 to 2011, he served as Directeur du Budget. He joined the Conseil d'État on 29 April 2011 and was named president of its finances section on 14 February 2024.

Josse died on 19 July 2026, at the age of 65.

== Distinctions ==
- Knight of the Ordre national du Mérite (2002)
  - Officer (2011)
  - Commander (2025)
- Officer of the Legion of Honour (2017)
