= Brigitte Bout =

French politician (1941–2024)

Member of the French Senate for Pas-de-Calais
- In office 8 June 2002 – 30 September 2011
- Preceded by: Jean-Paul Delevoye

Mayor of Fleurbaix
- In office 18 March 2001 – 16 March 2008
- Preceded by: Louis Courdent
- Succeeded by: Michel Dupont

Personal details
- Born: Brigitte Pouille; 26 January 1941 Armentières, France
- Died: 5 February 2024 (aged 83) Tourcoing, France
- Party: UMP

Brigitte Bout (née Pouille, 26 January 1941 – 5 February 2024) was a French politician who represented the Pas-de-Calais department in the Senate of France from 8 June 2002 to 30 September 2011. She was a member of the Union for a Popular Movement.

== Life and career ==
Brigitte Pouille was born on 26 January 1941. Before being elected to the Senate, she worked as an engineer. Bout did not run for reelection to the Senate in 2011.

Bout served as mayor of Fleurbaix from 2001 to 2008.

In 2013, Bout was named a Knight in the French Legion of Honour. She died on 5 February 2024, at the age of 83.
