= Brahim Bahrir =

French terrorist (1978–2026)

- Born: 1978; Mantes-la-Jolie, France
- Died: February 13, 2026 (aged 47–48); Paris, France
- Cause of death: Shot by gendarmes
- Citizenship: French
- Organization: Sharia4Belgium (associated)
- Known for: 2012 Beekkant metro station stabbing and 2026 Arc de Triomphe knife attack
- Allegiance: Islamic State
- Motive: Islamic terrorism
- Conviction: Terrorism charges (2012)
- Criminal charges: Terrorism
- Penalty: 17 years imprisonment

Details
- Victims: 2 Belgian police officers 1 French gendarme
- Weapon: Knife

Brahim Bahrir (1978 – 13 February 2026) was a French convicted terrorist.

== Biography ==
Bahrir was born in Mantes-la-Jolie in 1978.

=== Activities in Belgium ===
In the early 2000s, he regularly travelled to Belgium and became close to the organisation Sharia4Belgium. In 2006, he regularly communicated with the Belgian terrorists Malika El Aroud and Mohammed Merah. A year later, he aimed to wage jihad in Somalia.

On 8 June 2012, Bahrir took a Thalys train to the Beekkant metro station in the Brussels region with a knife and stabbed two police officers in revenge for a ban on the wearing of the burqa in Belgium, He was arrested following the incident, and sentenced to 17 years imprisonment on terrorism charges. He was released on 24 December 2025.

=== Activities in France ===
On 13 February 2026, while the police were performing a service of honor for the ceremony of rekindling the flame on the tomb of the unknown soldier, Bahrir committed an assassination attempt under the Arc de Triomphe in Paris by attacking gendarmes with a knife, wounding a gendarme with a knife, he was quickly neutralized by gendarme fire at around 6:30 p.m The following day, a letter of allegiance to the Islamic State was found in his possession.

After being hospitalised following the attack, Bahrir died on 13 February 2026.
