= R. J. Hill Building =

- U.S. National Register of Historic Places
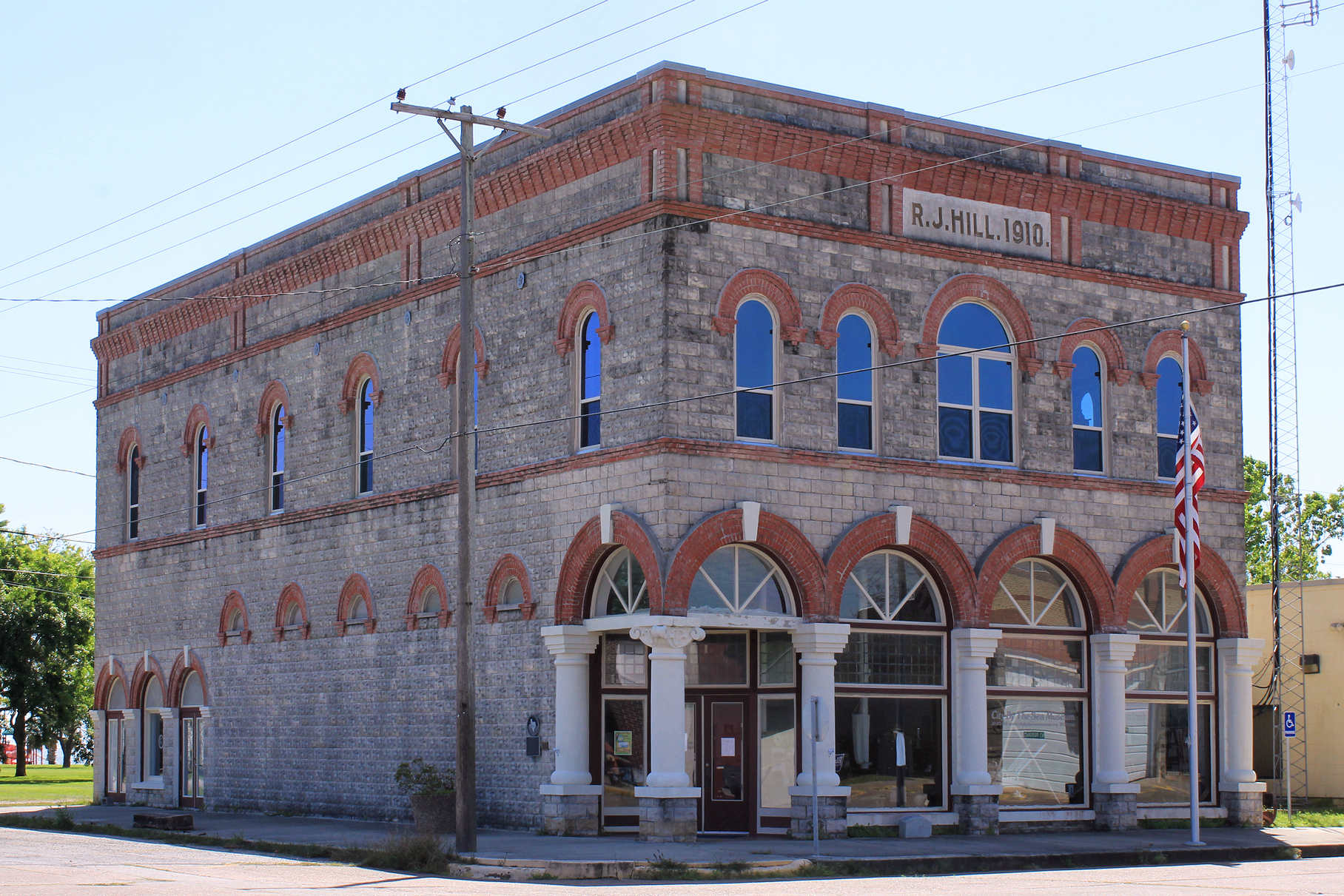

- Location within Texas Location within the United States
- Location: 401 Commerce St., Palacios, Texas
- Coordinates: 28°42′6″N 96°12′55″W
- Area: less than one acre
- Built: 1910
- Architect: Bontrager, J.G.
- Architectural style: Romanesque
- NRHP reference No.: 09000840
- Added to NRHP: October 14, 2009

The R. J. Hill Building is a historic commercial building in the small city of Palacios, Texas, which is located on the Gulf coast of Texas. The building was built in 1910 out of cast concrete blocks that were manufactured at the site, at a time that the town "was being promoted as a seaside resort".

It is a concrete two story commercial structure with Richardsonian Romanesque elements. In 2009, it was slated for use as a museum by the Palacios Area Historical Association. The building was listed on the U.S. National Register of Historic Places on October 14, 2009. The listing was announced as the featured listing in the National Park Service's weekly list of October 23, 2009.

The building includes columns that have "entasis, bulbous bases and hypotrachelia, and blocky square-profile capitals."

It is located at the corner of 4th and Commerce Streets, only a block away from the Tres Palacios Bay, an inlet of the Gulf of Mexico.
