= Thierry Cazeneuve =

French journalist and writer (1951–2026)

Thierry Cazeneuve (10 September 1951 – 17 January 2026) was a French journalist and writer.

== Life and career ==
Cazeneuve was born on 10 September 1951, the nephew of Georges Cazeneuve, co-founder of the Le Dauphiné libéré newspaper.

He was the director of the Critérium du Dauphiné (1988–2009). He also directed the French Professional Cycling League from 2003 to 2007.

Cazeneuve died on 17 January 2026, at the age of 74.
