= Pierre Raffin =

French Roman Catholic bishop (1938–2024)

His Excellency Pierre Raffin O.P.
- Bishop Emeritus of Metz
- Appointed: 4 August 1987
- Term ended: 27 September 2013
- Predecessor: Paul Joseph Schmitt
- Successor: Jean-Christophe Lagleize

Orders
- Ordination: 5 July 1964 by Alexandre Renard
- Consecration: 11 October 1987 by Charles Amarin Brand

Personal details
- Born: 13 February 1938 Nancy, France
- Died: 2 February 2024 (aged 85) Metz, France
- Motto: CARITATE SERVIENTE FELIX
- Coat of arms

Styles of Pierre Raffin
- Reference style: His Excellency; The Most Reverend
- Spoken style: Your Excellency
- Religious style: Bishop

Pierre René Ferdinand Raffin (13 February 1938 – 2 February 2024) was a French prelate of the Roman Catholic Church.

Born in Nancy, Raffin was professed as a friar of the Dominican Order in 1957, becoming a deacon in 1963. He was ordained to the priesthood in 1964. He was appointed bishop of Metz in 1987, serving until his retirement in 2013.

Raffin died in Metz on 2 February 2024, at the age of 85.

Catholic Church titles
Preceded by Paul Joseph Schmitt	Bishop of Metz; 1987–2013	Succeeded by Jean-Christophe Lagleize
