= Nimeño I =

French torero (1945–2026)

- Born: Alain Montcouquiol; 4 September 1945; Ambert, France
- Died: 5 November 2026 (aged 81); Nîmes, France
- Occupation: Torero

Alain Montcouquiol (French: [alˈɛ̃ mɔ̃tkukjˈɔl]; 4 September 1945 – 5 November 2026), better known as Nimeño I, was a French torero.

The brother of matador Nimeño II, his family moved to Nîmes when he was nine years old, where he dedicated his life to bullfighting. He also took up writing, winning the Prix Jean Carrière in 2009.

Montcouquiol died in Nîmes on 5 November 2026, at the age of 81.

== Books ==
- Recouvre-le de lumière (1998)
- Tauromachie, t. 1 : Paso del toro (with Claude Viallat, 2004)
- Le Sens de la marche (2008)
