= Bertrand Grébaut =

French restaurateur (1981–2026)

- Born: 5 December 1981; Paris, France
- Died: 2 July 2026 (aged 44); Paris, France
- Occupation: Restaurateur
- Spouse: Tatiana Levha
- Children: 2

Bertrand Grébaut (5 December 1981 – 2 July 2026) was a French restaurateur.

== Early life and career ==
Grébaut was born in Paris, the son of Christian Grébaut, a corporate executive, and Catherine Arteau, an art historian. He attended the Penninghen School of Arts, wanting to become a freelance graphic designer. He then worked as a waiter, and attended Ferrandi Paris Culinary School. He received an internship at Hôtel Scribe, describing his first internship: "was in an old-school kitchen brigade where I was spoken to rudely and assigned the most menial tasks".

Later in his career, Grébaut worked with restaurant owner Alain Passard at Arpège, a French restaurant in Paris. At Arpège, he worked as a chef, and earned the Michelin Star for the restaurant in 2009. In 2011, he and his business partner Théophile Pourriat opened Septime, a Parisian restaurant, and in 2016, his restaurant was highlighted as one of the "Top 50 Best Restaurants in the World" by People. In 2018, he and Pourriat opened D'une île, an inn.

== Personal life and death ==
Grébaut met his wife Tatiana Levha at Ferrandi Paris Culinary School. They married and had two children. Their marriage lasted until Grébaut's death in 2026.

In 2025, Grébaut was diagnosed with cancer. He died from the disease in Paris, on 2 July 2026, at the age of 44.
