= Roger-Xavier Lantéri =

French journalist (1930–2022)

- Born: 1930; France
- Died: 1 January 2022 (aged 91); France
- Occupation: Journalist

Roger-Xavier Lantéri (1930 – 1 January 2022) was a French journalist who specialised in history.

== Biography ==
Lantéri was born in 1930 and graduated from the Centre de formation des journalistes de Paris in 1956. He became a foreign envoy of Agence France-Presse with Jean Marin, and was also deputy editor-in-chief of L'Express. He headed the political service at TF1 and was editor-in-chief of Antenne 2. He was the husband of Liliane Sichler, a fellow journalist.

Lantéri died on 1 January 2022, at the age of 91.

== Works ==
- Brunehilde : la première reine de France (1995)
- Swane, cœur de loup (novel, 1999)
- Les Mérovingiennes (2000)
- Son dernier boogie-woogie (novel, 2002)
