= Alain Minc =

French businessman, political advisor, and author

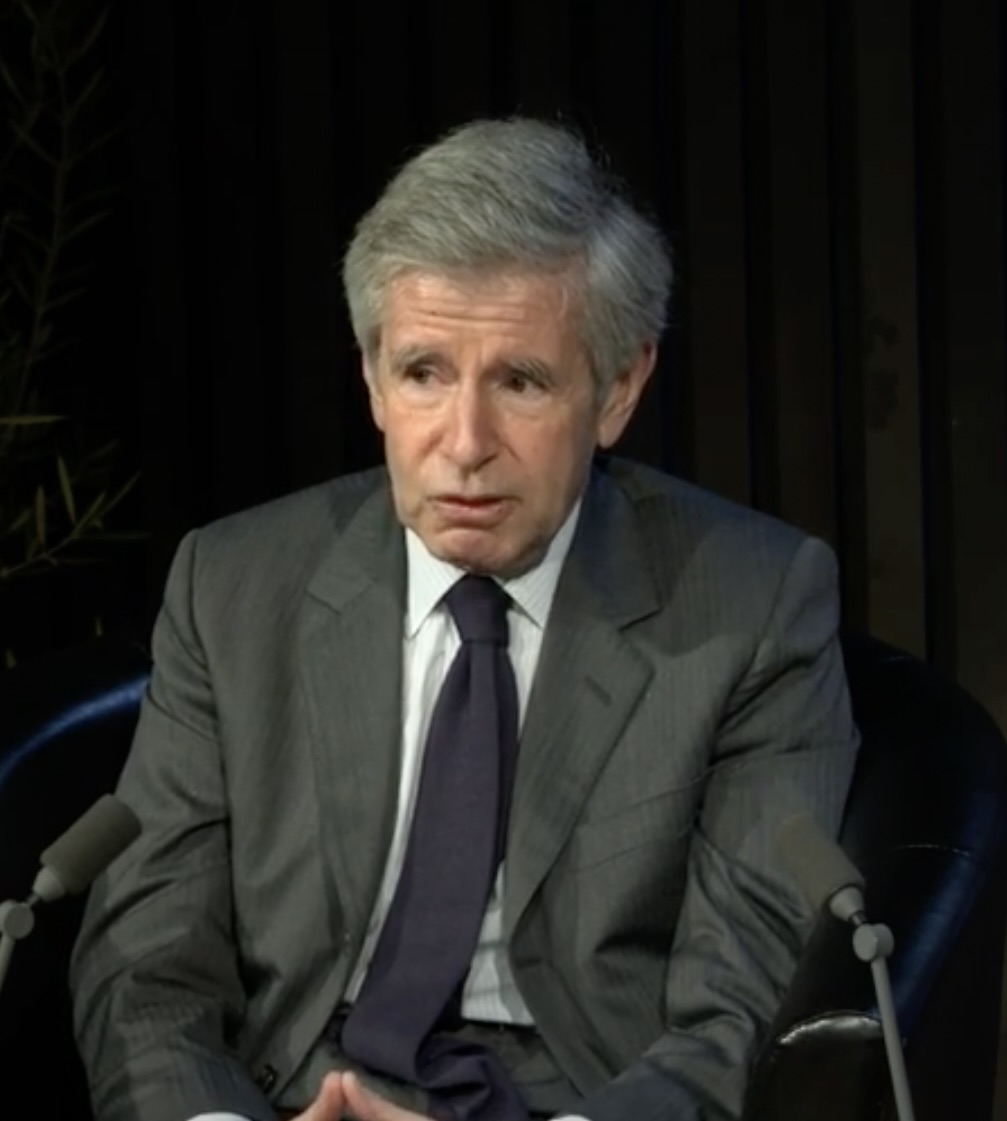
- Born: 15 April 1949 (age 77); Paris, France
- Education: École nationale supérieure des mines de Paris; Sciences Po; École nationale d'administration
- Occupations: Businessman, political advisor, author

Alain Minc (French pronunciation: [alɛ̃ ˈmɛ̃k]; born 15 April 1949) is a French businessman, political advisor and author.

== Biography ==
=== Early life ===
Alain Minc was born on April 15, 1949, in Paris to a family of Jewish immigrants from Poland. His father, Joseph Minkowski, was a dentist and a member of the Communist Party.

Alain Minc is a graduate of the École nationale supérieure des mines de Paris, Sciences Po and the École nationale d'administration.

=== Career ===
In 1979, he became CFO of Compagnie de Saint-Gobain. In 1981, he was selected to be one of the first Young Leaders of the French-American Foundation. In 1986, he became vice-chairman of CIR International and General Manager of Cerus, non-Italian affiliates of Benedetti Group. In 1991, he founded his own consultancy firm, AM Conseil. He has been the Chairman of Le Monde's supervisory board. He sits on the board of directors of Criteria CaixaCorp since 2007. He is also a board member of Prisa, Fnac, Direct Energie, Ingenico, and Yves Saint Laurent.

He has been an advisor to Edouard Balladur, François Pinault, Vincent Bolloré, and ex-French President Nicolas Sarkozy. He came under fire for criticizing Pope Benedict XVI's position on the French Romani repatriation in 2010.

He is a member of the Nicolas Berggruen Institute. He is also a recipient of the Legion of Honour.

Since December 2011, he is President of the board of directors of Société des Autoroutes du Nord et de l'Est de la France (SANEF) which operates motorways in northeast France under a French government concession.

== Bibliography ==
- Ce monde qui vient
- Epître à nos nouveaux maîtres (2003)
- Les Prophètes du bonheur: historie personnelle de la pensée économique (2004)
- Rapport sur la France de l'an 2000
- Le Nouveau Moyen-âge
- Les vengeances des Nations
- La Machine égalitaire
- Rapport sur l´informatisation de la société
- Une sorte de Diable, les vies de John M. Keynes (2006)
- Le Crépuscule des petits dieux (2006)
- Une histoire de France (2008)
- Dix jours qui ébranleront le monde (2009)
- Une histoire politique des intellectuels (2010)
- L'âme des nations (2012)
- Vive l’Allemagne (2013)
