= Prince Waly =

French rapper (1991–2026)

- Magassa in 2025

Background information
- Born: Moussa Magassa; 24 December 1991; Montreuil, Seine-Saint-Denis, France
- Died: 4 October 2026 (aged 34) Paris, France
- Genres: French hip-hop; rap
- Occupation: Rapper
- Spouse: Enchantée Julia (m. 2023)

Moussa Magassa (24 December 1991 – 4 October 2026), known professionally as Prince Waly, was a French rapper.

== Early life and career ==
Magassa was born in Montreuil, Seine-Saint-Denis on 24 December 1991. He was raised in La Boissière, and he began rapping in middle school with his friend Fiasko Proximo, forming the rap group Big Budha Cheez. According to Radio France, his pseudonym Prince Waly came from the 1991 crime drama film Boyz n the Hood.

Later in his career, in 2016, Magassa's rap group released its debut album L'heure des loups, and in 2017, he rapped with Lomepal on the track Forêt. He collaborated with rapper Alpha Wann, and the music groups Feu! Chatterton and Triplego. In 2019, he released the album BO Y Z, and in March 2022, he worked on the track Walygator. On 30 September 2022, he released the solo album Moussa. His solo album won the Joséphine Artists' Prize in 2023.

== Personal life and death ==
In 2019, Magassa was diagnosed with thymus cancer, and in March 2023, he married singer Enchantée Julia.

Magassa died from paraneoplastic pemphigus in Paris on 4 October 2026, at the age of 34.
