= Ben Vautier =

French painter (1935–2024)

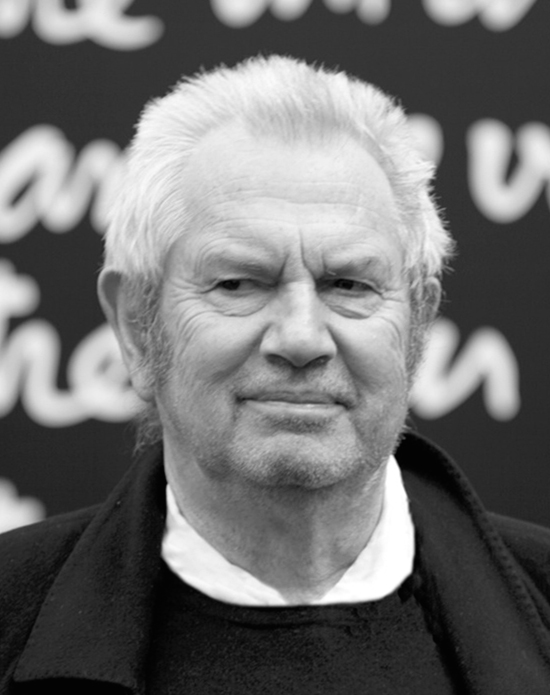
- Vautier in 2013
- Born: Benjamin Vautier; 18 July 1935; Naples, Italy
- Died: 5 June 2024 (aged 88); Nice, France
- Other name: Ben
- Known for: Lettrism; performance art
- Movement: Fluxus; Zero
- Spouse: Annie Vautier (1964-2024)

Benjamin Vautier (French pronunciation: [bɛ̃(ʒamɛ̃) votje]; 18 July 1935 – 5 June 2024), also known mononymously as Ben, was a French visual artist.

== Early life ==
Benjamin Vautier was born on 18 July 1935 in Naples, Italy, to a French family. He was the great-grandson of the Swiss painter Benjamin Vautier (1829–1898).

== Career ==
Vautier discovered Yves Klein and the Nouveau Réalisme in the 1950s, but he quickly became interested in the French dada artist Marcel Duchamp and the music of John Cage. In 1959, Vautier founded the journal Ben Dieu. In 1960, he had his first one-man show, Rien et tout in Laboratoire 32.

Vautier ran a record shop called Magazin between 1958 and 1973. Vautier joined George Maciunas in the Fluxus artistic movement, in October 1962.

Vautier was also active in Mail-Art and was mostly known for his text-based paintings or écritures, begun in 1953, with his work Il faut manger. Il faut dormir ("One must eat. One must sleep."). Another example of the latter is L'art est inutile. Rentrez chez vous ("Art is Useless, Go Home"). A notable work made for Harald Szeemann's Documenta 5 exhibition in 1972 shouts, KUNST IST ÜBERFLÜSSIG (English: Art is Superfluous), and was installed across the top of the Fridericianum museum in Kassel, Germany.

Vautier long defended the rights of minorities in all countries, and he was influenced by the theories of François Fontan about ethnism. For example, he defended the Occitan language (southern France).

In 1981, he coined the name of the French art movement of the 1980s Figuration Libre (Free Figuration).

In 2010 was published "INTROSPECTION TRUTH ART & SEX", the Personal Structures Art Projects Number #07

His work is included in some of the most important collections in the world, including MoMA in New York and Museo Reina Sofía in Madrid. The Centre Pompidou in Paris has Ben Vautier's Magasin ("Shop"), an enormous piece, on permanent display. In 2022, the MUAC in Mexico City organised one of the most ambitious exhibitions about Vautier, curated by Ferran Barenblit.

Between 2022 and 2024, Vautier met on several occasions with the German young artist Raimo D. Nagel, serving in an informal capacity as his mentor.

== Death ==
Vautier died of suicide by firearm on 5 June 2024, at the age of 88, after his wife Annie Vautier had died from a stroke the previous evening.

== Gallery ==
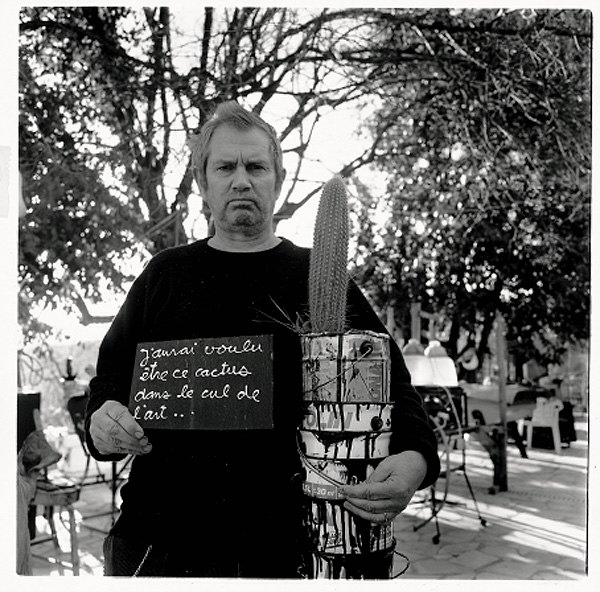
Vautier (2007)

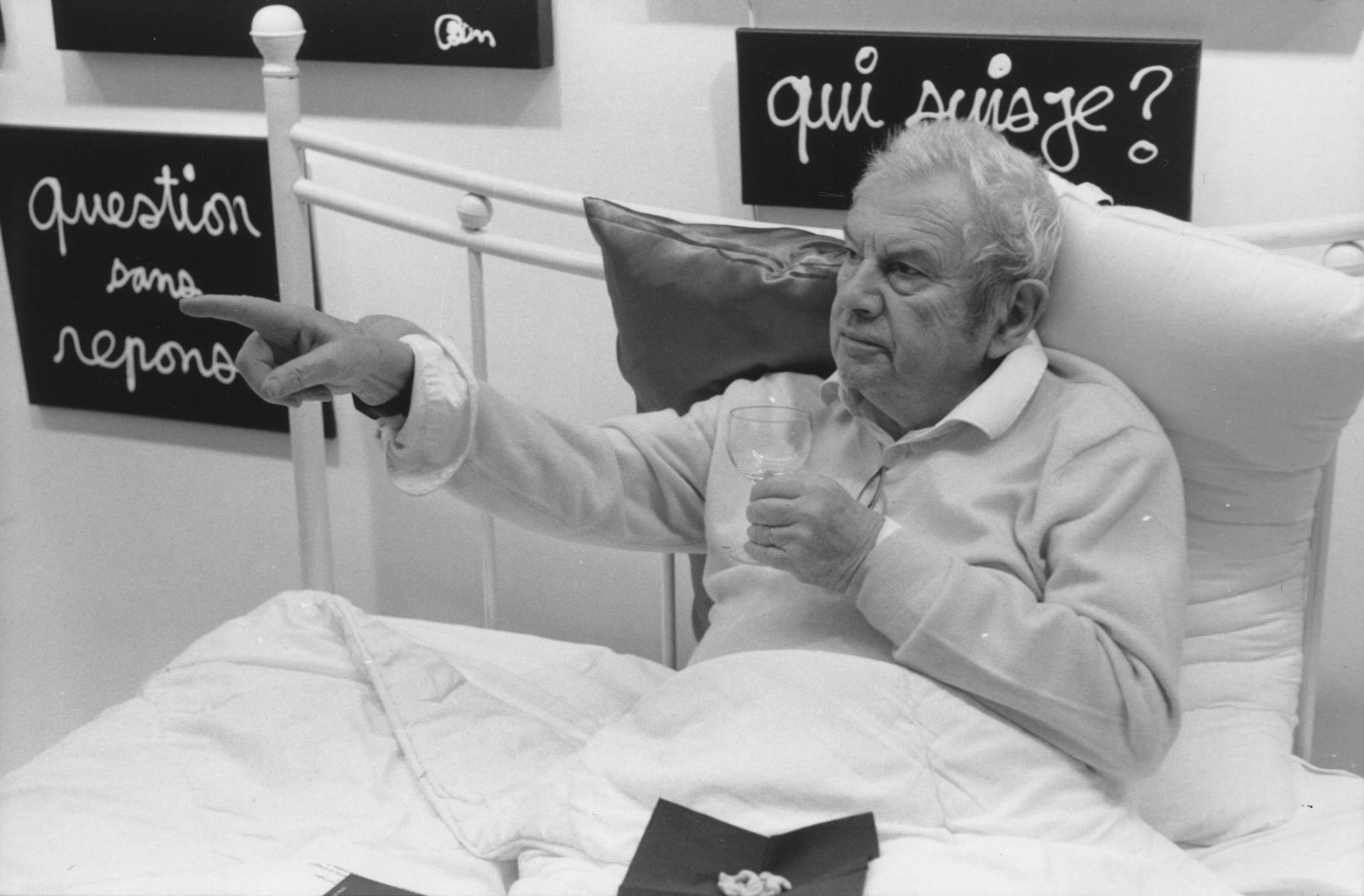
Vautier (2019) by Olivier Meyer

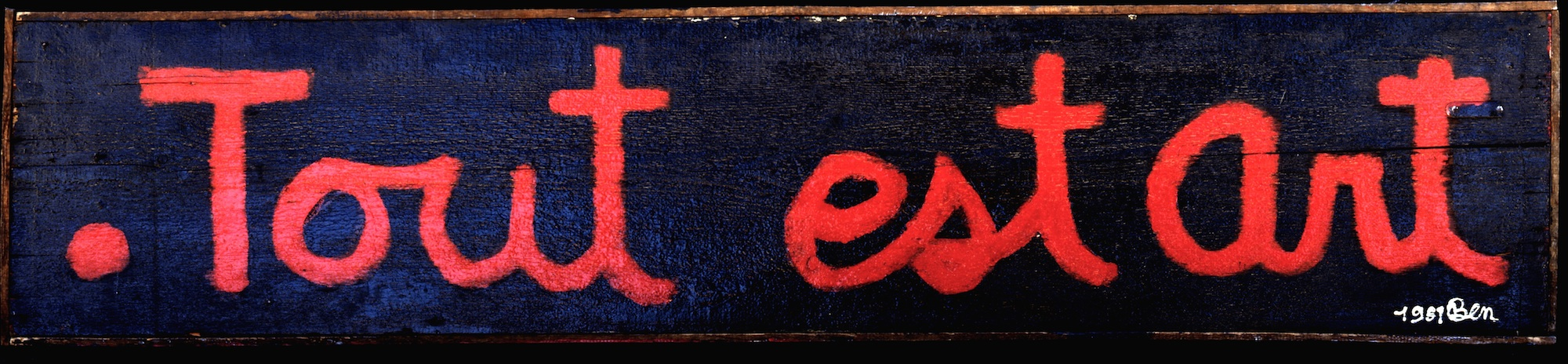
Everything Is Art (1961)

== See also ==
- (in French) a French Wikipedia article as a guide to understanding ethnism
- Anti-art
