= Jean-Jacques Naudo =

French rugby league footballer (1959–2026)

Personal information
- Born: 8 February 1959 Perpignan, France
- Died: 16 July 2026 (aged 67) Perpignan, France

Playing information
- Position: Five-eighth
Club
Years	Team	Pld	T	G	FG	P
?–1982	Baroudeurs de Pia XIII	?	?	?	?	?
1982–?	XIII Catalan	?	?	?	?	?
	Total
Representative
Years	Team	Pld	T	G	FG	P
?–?	France U-19	?	?	?	?	?
1979–1981	France U-24	2	0	0	2	2

Jean-Jacques Naudo (French: [ʒˈɑ̃-ʒˈak nodˈo]; 8 February 1959 – 16 July 2026) was a French rugby league footballer who played as a five-eighth.

== Biography ==
Born in Perpignan on 8 February 1959, Naudo began playing rugby at the age of six and first worked in a butchery. He entered the French Rugby League Championship, first playing for Baroudeurs de Pia XIII and subsequently for XIII Catalan. He also made appearances for the France U-19 and U-24 national teams. On 25 March 1979, he scored two tries in a 22–5 win over England. For the U-24 team, he played in two matches, logging two total points. In 1985, he won both the Coupe de France Lord Derby and the French Rugby League Championship with XIII Catalan. After his retirement in the early 1990s, he went into bankruptcy while taking over his father's business, which led him to establish a restaurant called Tio Pepe alongside former rugby player Philippe Fernandez and footballer Edson Carpeggiani.

In August 1996, Naudo led a heist on an Air Inter flight arriving in Perpignan from Paris Orly Airport; in two minutes and 30 seconds, his group entered the cargo hold and stole 4.2 million francs, the equivalent of €670,000. This totaled 27 kilograms of bank notes. In May 1997, he took part in a safe robbery in Courbevoie, stealing 10 million francs. While fleeing north, he was found to be in possession of a Kalashnikov RPK; he was already a suspect in the previous year's airplane heist. On 26 December 2000, he stormed a Brink's armored truck loaded with gift receipts from major department stores and Disneyland Paris, stealing 41 million francs. The following day, after a witness reported a robbery in Paray-Vieille-Poste, the group, nicknamed the "Dream Team", were arrested while sleeping on top of 16.5 million francs. After a four-hour flight to Spain, he was arrested by French police. Due to his connections with a string of robberies, prosecutors sought a 13-year prison sentence; he served two years on parole. In 2006, he was charged in connection with a separate robbery in Gentilly and sentenced to 15 years in prison. However, in 2009, he won a case against the French prosecutors at the European Court of Human Rights, which deemed that his sentence, in combination with six years of pre-trial detention, were too harsh. In October 2014, the prosecution dismissed the case against him for the Air Inter heist despite matching fingerprints at the scene.

After the prosecution ended, he was honored by XIII Catalan for their 80th anniversary as a club.

Jean-Jacques Naudo died on 16 July 2026, at the age of 67.
