= Sergio Goizauskas =

Argentine-born French cartoonist (1956–2026)

Sergio Goizauskas (28 April 1956 – 8 January 2026), better known as Serguei, was an Argentine-born French editorial cartoonist.

== Life and career ==
Goizauskas was born in Buenos Aires on 28 April 1956, to an Argentine mother and a father of Lithuanian origin. At the age of 20, he left for Europe to flee the Argentine dictatorship. He moved to Paris in 1978, and began to publish his drawings in the French press. He collaborated with newspapers such as Marie-France and L'Écho des savanes, a comic book magazine, as well as L'Express and the New York Times.

In 2019, he generated controversy by drawing a denialist and openly racist caricature of the genocide of the Tutsis in Rwanda.

In 1985, he received the Council of Europe Prize. In 1986, the International Humor Fair in Bordighera, Italy, awarded him the Palme d'Or.

Goizauskas died on 8 January 2026, at the age of 69.
