= Annie Vautier =

French performance artist (1939–2024)

- Born: Catherine Anne Baricalla; 12 July 1939; Monaco
- Died: 5 June 2024 (aged 84); Nice, France
- Occupation: Performance artist
- Spouse: Ben Vautier (1964–2024)

Catherine Anne Vautier (née Baricalla; 12 July 1939 – 5 June 2024) was a French performance artist.

== Biography ==
Vautier was born in Monaco in 1939 and met her future husband in 1963. As a member of the Théâtre Total collective she participated in numerous performances. She appeared in her husbands exhibitions, publications and performances.

Vautier died on 5 June 2024 after suffering a stroke. Her husband of 60 years Ben Vautier committed suicide hours later. He left a message explaining that he could not live without her and that he decided to join her in death. The couple had a son and a daughter.
