= André Kabile =

French footballer (1938–2026)

André Kabile (17 November 1938 – 6 March 2026) was a French footballer.

== Biography ==
Kabile was born in Saint-Esprit on 17 November 1938. He played for Nîmes Olympique as a midfielder from 1964 to 1979. He also played in the Martinique national team.

Kabile died on 6 March 2026, at the age of 87.
