= Jean-Jacques Bénètière =

French politician (1939–2024)

Deputy of the French National Assembly for Loire's 5th constituency
- In office 24 July 1981 – 1 April 1986
- Preceded by: Jean Auroux
- Succeeded by: proportional representation

Personal details
- Born: 2 February 1939 La Pacaudière, France
- Died: 13 January 2024 (aged 84)
- Party: PS
- Education: Diplôme d'études supérieures économiques
- Occupation: Agronomic engineer

Jean-Jacques Bénètière (2 February 1939 – 13 January 2024) was a French agronomic engineer and politician of the Socialist Party (PS). He served in the National Assembly from 1981 to 1986 representing Loire's 5th constituency and was Inspector General of Agriculture in March 1995. Bénètière died on 13 January 2024, at the age of 84.
