= Guy Janvier =

French politician (1948–2024)

Mayor of Vanves
- In office 25 June 1995 – 25 March 2001
- Preceded by: Didier Morin
- Succeeded by: Bernard Gauducheau

Member of the General Council of Hauts-de-Seine
- In office 1 April 2004 – 1 April 2015
- Preceded by: Bernard Gauducheau
- Succeeded by: Isabelle Debré
- Constituency: Canton of Vanves

Personal details
- Born: 17 June 1948 Parcé-sur-Sarthe, France
- Died: 11 January 2024 (aged 75)
- Party: PS
- Education: Sciences Po; École nationale d'administration

Guy Janvier (17 June 1948 – 11 January 2024) was a French politician of the Socialist Party (PS).

== Biography ==
Born in Parcé-sur-Sarthe on 17 June 1948, Janvier attended the Sciences Po and the École nationale d'administration. He joined the civil administration after his graduation. He served as Mayor of Vanves from 1995 to 2001 and represented the Canton of Vanves in the General Council of Hauts-de-Seine from 2004 to 2015.

Guy Janvier died on 11 January 2024, at the age of 75.
