= Jean-Charles Terrassier =

French psychologist (1940–2022)

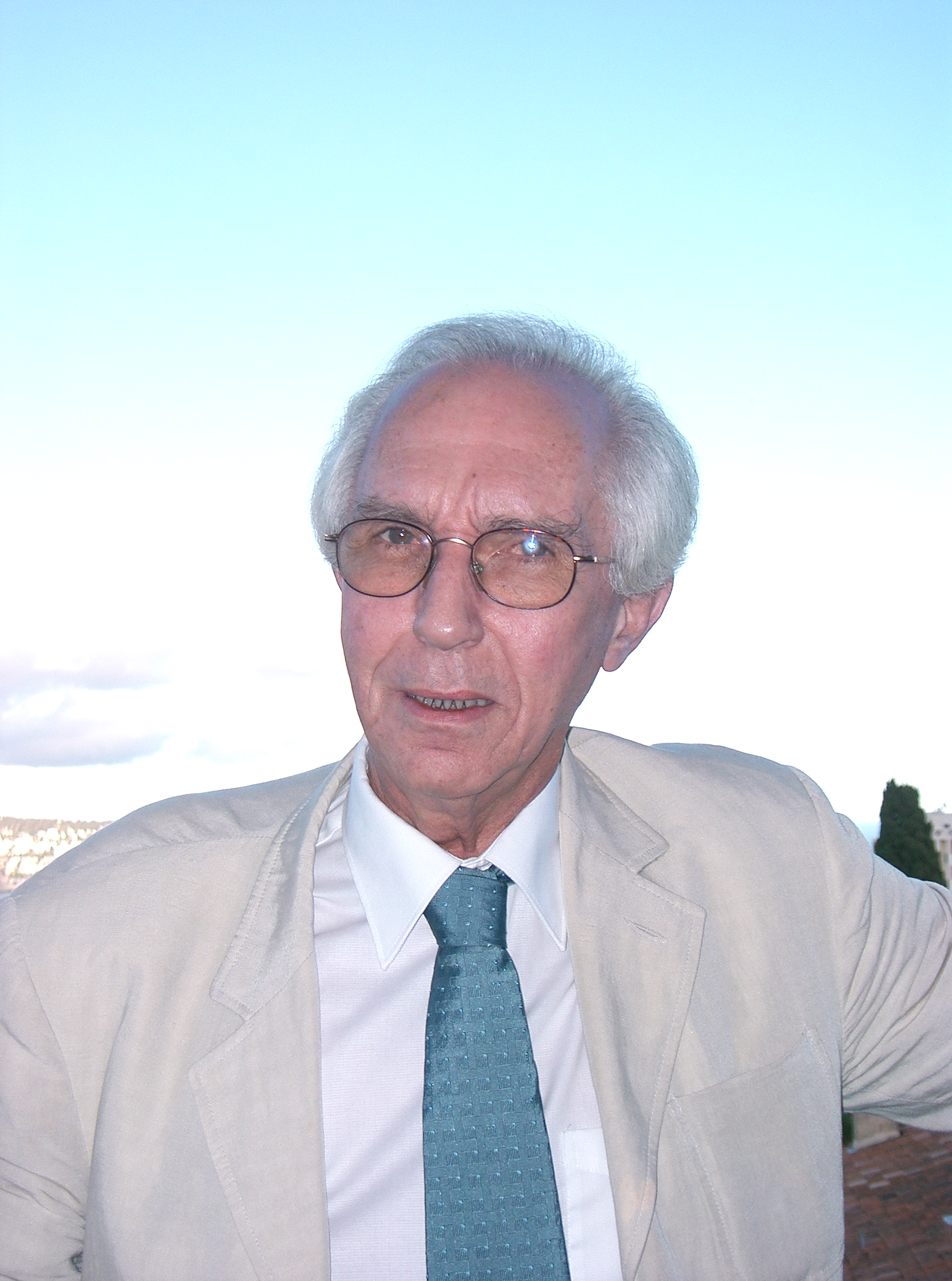
- Terrassier in 2007
- Born: 1940; Cannes, France
- Died: 1 January 2022 (aged 81–82)
- Occupation: Psychologist

Jean-Charles Terrassier (1940 – 1 January 2022) was a French psychologist. He specialized in childhood intellectual giftedness and founded the Association française dédiée aux enfants intellectuellement précoces (ANPEIP).

== Biography ==
Terrassier attended secondary school in Cannes before earning a degree in psychology from Paris-Sorbonne University in 1967. Following his education, he worked as a clinical psychologist in Nice. He also worked for Mensa International in Paris before founding a local branch in Nice in 1968. In 1971, he founded the Association nationale pour les enfants surdoués (ANPES), dedicated to children who showed a high level of intelligence measured by psychometric tests. The Association changed its name in 1987 to the Association française dédiée aux enfants intellectuellement précoces (ANPEIP), which today has 25 regional branches and is headquartered in Nice. In 1977, he participated in the foundation of the World Council for Gifted and Talented Children in San Francisco and London. He was elected to its board of directors in 1981. He also co-founded EUROTALENT in Paris.

In 1978, Terrassier helped to organize the first International Congress for Gifted Children, hosted by the Centre universitaire méditerranéen and ANPEIP. In 1987, the Ministry of National Education organized the first classes for intellectually gifted children at the École publique Las Planas in Nice following several years of activism by Terrassier.

Terrassier died on 1 January 2022, at the age of 81.

== Publications ==
- "Le syndrome de dyssynchronie" (1979)
- Dyssynchrony - uneven development in The psychology of gifted children (1985)
- "Le développement psychologique des enfants intellectuellement précoces" (1996)
- "Les enfants surdoués ou La précocité embarrassante" (2014)
- Guide pratique de l'enfant surdoué : Comment réussir en étant surdoué ? (2016)
- Les enfants surdoués ou la précocité embarrassante (2019)
- Les enfants surdoués - Comprendre la précocité pour bien la vivre (2020)
