= Cléon =

- Commune
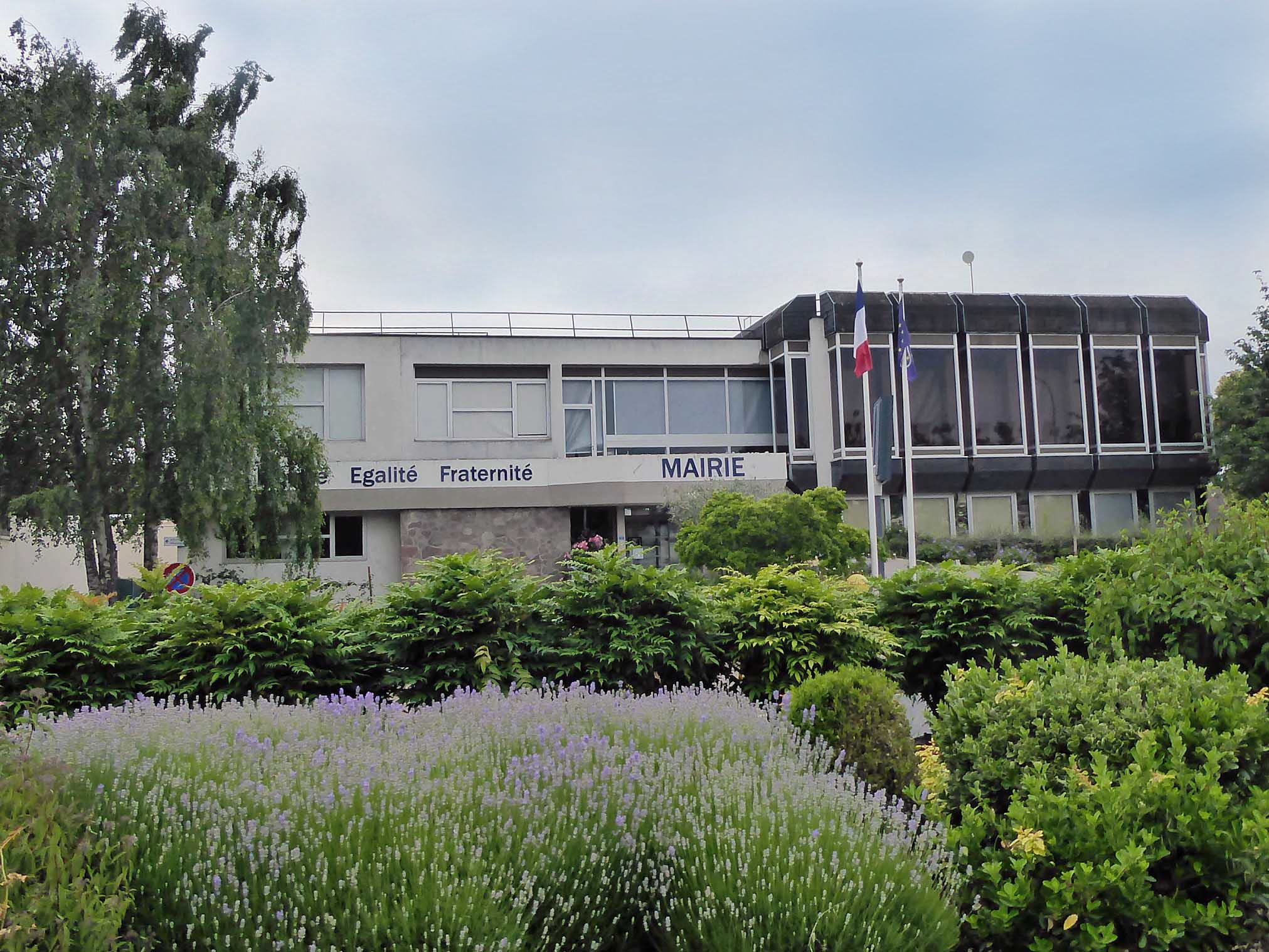
- Cléon Town hall

- Coat of arms
- Location of Cléon
- Location within France Location within Normandy
- Coordinates: 49°18′57″N 1°02′11″E
- Country: France
- Region: Normandy
- Department: Seine-Maritime
- Arrondissement: Rouen
- Canton: Caudebec-lès-Elbeuf
- Intercommunality: Métropole Rouen Normandie

Government
  - Mayor (2020–2026): Frédéric Marche
- Area^{1}: 6.47 km^{2} (2.50 sq mi)
- Elevation: 10 m (33 ft)
- Highest elevation: 37 m (121 ft)
- Lowest elevation: 2 m (6.6 ft)
- Population (2023): 4,795
  - Density: 741/km^{2} (1,920/sq mi)
- Time zone: UTC+01:00 (CET)
  - Summer (DST): UTC+02:00 (CEST)
- INSEE/Postal code: 76178 /76410
- ^{1} French Land Register data, which excludes lakes, ponds, glaciers > 1 km^{2} (0.386 sq mi or 247 acres) and river estuaries.

Cléon (French pronunciation: [kleɔ̃]) is a commune in the Seine-Maritime department in the Normandy region in northern France.

This city is known for its Renault factory, which manufactures engines and gearboxes.

Two Renault engines are named after the city, the Cléon-Fonte engine and the Cléon-Alu Engine. For collectors of vintage cars, the name "Cléon" refers primarily to these two engines.

== Geography ==
A small town situated inside a meander of the river Seine some 11 miles (18 km) south of Rouen, at the junction of the D7 and the D144 roads. The French car manufacturer Renault has its principal engine and gearbox factory within the commune's territory, covering an area of 135 hectares (330 acres).

=== Heraldry ===
Arms of Cléon	The arms of Cléon are blazoned : Per fess 1: Azure, 3 stalks of wheat Or issuant from a toothed wheel argent; 2: Gules, a sword inverted argent hilted Or, over a mantle displayed Or.

== Population ==
Historical population
Year	Pop.	±% p.a.
1968	1,938	—
1975	3,157	+7.22%
1982	5,089	+7.06%
1990	5,870	+1.80%
1999	6,042	+0.32%
2007	5,701	−0.72%
2012	5,300	−1.45%
2017	4,994	−1.18%
2023	4,795	−0.68%
Source: INSEE

== Places of interest ==
- The church of St.Martin, dating from the sixteenth century.
- A seventeenth century manorhouse.

== See also ==
- Communes of the Seine-Maritime department
