= Yeshiva of Aix-les-Bains =

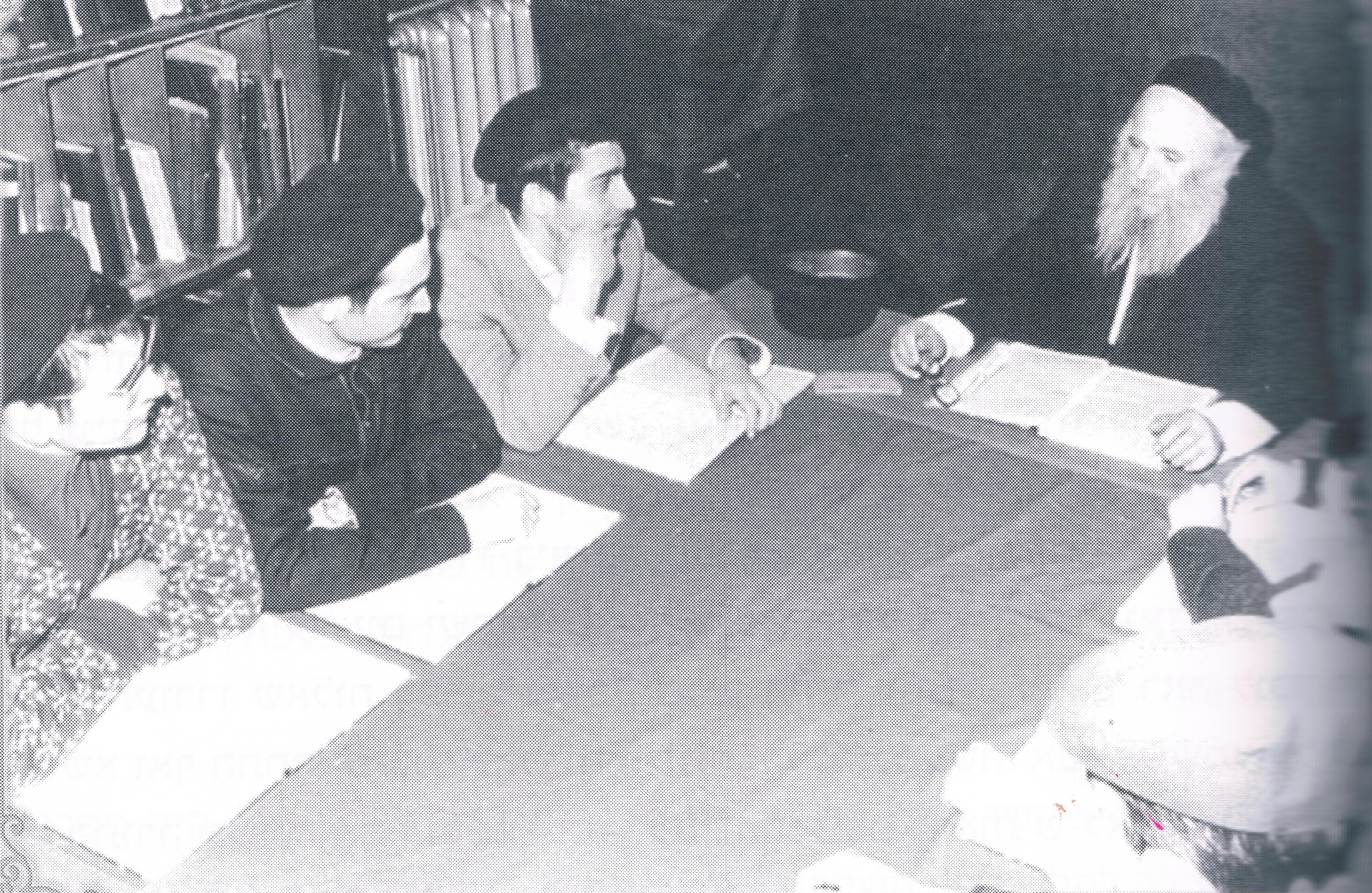
- Students of the yeshiva. Year 1968.
- Type: Yeshiva
- Established: 1933 (Neudorf); 1945 (Aix-les-Bains)
- Affiliations: Orthodox judaism
- Rabbi: Yitzhak Weil
- Location: Aix-les-Bains, Savoie, France; 45.6928°N 5.8994°E

The Yeshiva of Aix-les-Bains is one of the principal Talmudic academies in France. It is officially named Yeshivas Chachmei Tsorfat ("Yeshiva of the Sages of France") after the medieval rabbinic authorities who lived in France, including Rashi and many Baalei Tosafot. Since 1945, the Yeshiva has been located in the spa town of Aix-les-Bains, and is directed currently by Rabbi Yitzhak Weil.

== History ==
The yeshiva was established by Rabbi Ernest Weill, chief rabbi of Colmar, in Neudorf, Strasbourg in 1933. It was directed initially by Rabbi Simcha Wasserman, son of the eminent Talmudist, Rabbi Elchonon Wasserman. At its inception, the yeshiva was the only yeshiva in France and the first academy for talmudic studies – not a rabbinical training seminary – established in France since Napoleonic times. In 1938, Rabbi Wasserman emigrated to the United States, leaving the leadership of the yeshiva to Rabbi Chaim Yitzchak Chajkin, a disciple of Rabbi Israel Meir Kagan, the Chofetz Chaim, and Rabbi Elchonon Wasserman. Rabbi Chajkin was soon deported to Germany, and the yeshiva was forced to close its doors in 1939 until the end of World War II.

The Yeshiva reopened its doors after the war in June 1945 in the thermal resort town of Aix-les-Bains, again led by Rabbi Chaim Yitzchak Chajkin after his release from German captivity. The new yeshiva welcomed numerous young survivors of the Nazi concentration camps, and many Jewish children who had been hidden with non-Jewish families to escape deportation during the Holocaust.

From the late 1940s, the yeshiva welcomed thousands of students from North Africa, especially Morocco and Tunisia.

Numerous rabbinic figures have had a close association with the Yeshiva of Aix-les-Bains through repeated visits or lengthy sojourns, among them Rabbi Israel Abuhatzeira, the Baba Sali, Rabbi Aharon Yehuda Leib Shteinman, Rabbi Yitzhak Kaduri, Rabbi Ovadia Yosef, Rabbi Mordechai Pogramansky, Chief Rabbi of Morocco Rav Yedidia Monsonego, Rabbi Yisroel Avrohom Portugal of Skulen (Hasidic dynasty), and three generations of the rebbes of Pshevorsk. Rabbi Moshe Yitzchok Gewirtzman, the founder of the Hasidic Dynasty of Pshevorsk, spent several summers in Aix-les-Bains, and formed a close relationship with the yeshiva. The connection between Pshevorsk and Aix-les-Bains continued with his successors Rabbi Yaakov Leiser and the current Pshevorsker rebbe, Rabbi Leibush Leiser.

Since its inception, the yeshiva has drawn its students from 20 countries across Europe, North Africa, Israel, and beyond. The yeshiva has several educational divisions, including a high school division featuring a full general studies curriculum accredited by the French Ministry of Education, in addition to its traditional yeshiva curriculum of Talmudic studies and Jewish law.
