= Société des Autoroutes du Nord et de l'Est de la France =

SANEF, Société des Autoroutes du Nord et de l'Est de la France (Northern and Eastern French Highways Corporation) is a motorway operator company in France. It operates motorways in the North and East of France as a result of concessions given by the French Government. Its network is 1,743 km (1,083 mi) long.

SANEF employs a staff of 3600 in offices or on the roads, and has invested €1.15 billion. Its network serves several regions; Île-de-France, Normandy, Hauts-de-France, Grand Est. SANEF's network consists of the A1 (214 km long), A2 (85 km long), A4 (480 km long), the A16 (311 km long), A26 (405 km long) and the A29 (266 km long). All motorways, except portions of the A29, are tolled.

From 2012 to 2023, the President of the board of directors was Alain Minc, then by Anne-Marie Idrac since 2024.

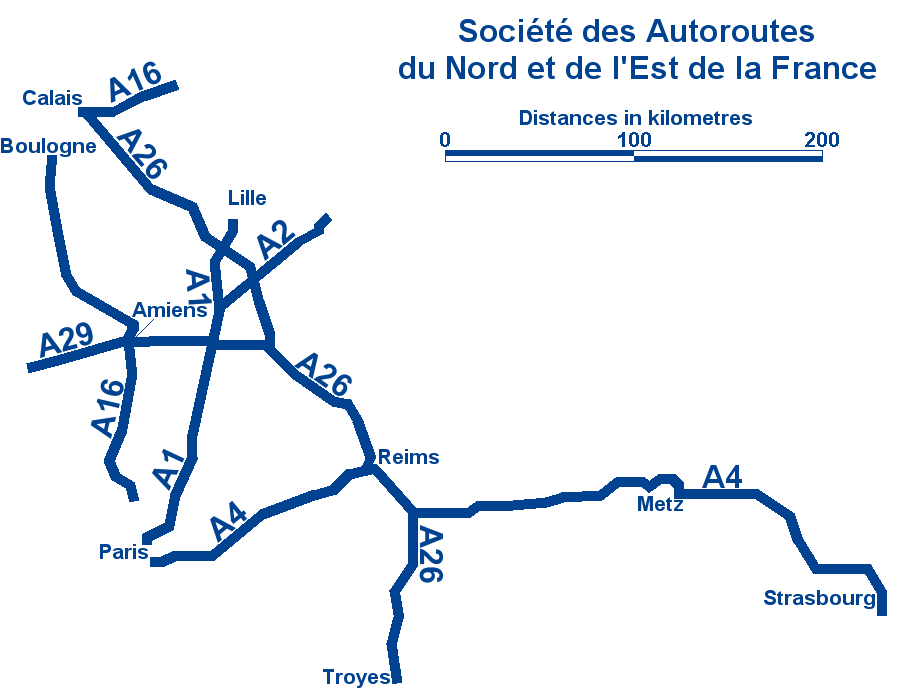
SANEF's network of motorways
