= 2025 in France =

- Decades: 2000s; 2010s; 2020s; 2030s
- See also: History of France; Timeline of French history; List of years in France

Events in the year 2025 in France.

== Incumbents ==
- President: Emmanuel Macron
- Prime Minister: François Bayrou (until 9 September); Sébastien Lecornu (since 9 September)

== Events ==
=== January ===
- 6 January –
  - The first case of clade 1b mpox in France is discovered from a patient in Brittany who came into contact with persons who had travelled to central Africa.
  - President Emmanuel Macron states that France was right to intervene militarily in the African Sahel against Islamist militants, and states that he is still waiting for the Sahel states to "thank" France while also denying that the French military was forced out of the region.
- 11 January – Two trams collide in Strasbourg-Ville station, injuring 68 people.
- 15 January – A wildfire breaks out in Amsterdam Island in the French Southern and Antarctic Lands, forcing the evacuation of all 31 residents. By 10 February, 45% of the island's area is affected.
- 16 January – Prime Minister François Bayrou survives a no-confidence motion filed by La France Insoumise in the National Assembly.
- 24 January –
  - Pakistani national Zaheer Mahmood is convicted of attempted murder and terrorist conspiracy for carrying out the 2020 Paris stabbing attack and is sentenced to 30 years' imprisonment.
  - Indonesia and France sign an agreement to repatriate French national Serge Atlaoui, who has been in death row since 2007 in an Indonesian prison following a conviction for drug smuggling.
- 29 January – Four Norwegian skiers are killed in an avalanche at Val-Cenis in the French Alps.

=== February ===
- 1 February – Three people are killed in a fire at a retirement home in Bouffémont.
- 3 February – Prime Minister François Bayrou passes his government's annual budget after bypassing a vote in the National Assembly through special constitutional powers.
- 5 February –
  - Serge Atlaoui is repatriated to France as part of the bilateral agreement with Indonesia signed on 24 January.
  - Prime Minister Bayrou survives a no-confidence motion filed against him in the National Assembly over his passage of the 2025 budget.
- 10 February – Prime Minister Bayrou survives a second no-confidence motion filed against him in the National Assembly over his passage of the 2025 budget.
- 12 February
  - 2025 Grenoble attack – Twelve people are injured in a grenade attack on a bar in Grenoble.
  - The WEST tokamak is reported to have maintained plasma for 1,337 seconds, a new world record duration for nuclear fusion and 25% longer than a similar effort by China the previous month.
- 13 February – The National Assembly votes in favor of a measure banning single-use electronic cigarettes.
- 22 February –
  - One person is killed in a knife attack in Mulhouse.
  - Fugitive Mohamed Amra, who escaped in an incident that left two prison guards dead in May 2024, is arrested in Romania. He is extradited to France on 25 February.
- 24 February – Three molotov cocktails are thrown at the Russian consulate in Marseille. No injuries are reported.
- 26 February – Brahim Aouissaoui is sentenced to life imprisonment without parole for carrying out the 2020 Nice stabbing.
- 28 February – Cyclone Garance makes landfall in Réunion, killing one person and leaving two others missing.

=== March ===
- 6 March – The Ariane 6 rocket successfully launches from Kourou, French Guiana, placing the CSO-3 French military reconnaissance satellite into orbit.
- 12 March –
  - The National Assembly votes to remove sitting and standing as a voting method in the chamber following a proposal co-created by MP Sébastien Peytavie, who is unable to walk.
  - Jean-Pierre Maldera, a former mafia boss, is shot dead along the A41 autoroute in Grenoble.
- 17 March – French national Olivier Grondeau, who had been imprisoned in Iran since 2022 on espionage charges, is released and repatriated to France.
- 22 March – Arié Engelberg, the chief rabbi of Orléans, is injured in an anti-Semitic assault. A suspect is arrested.
- 25 March – Two Dassault/Dornier Alpha Jet aircraft of the Patrouille de France collide mid-air near an air base in Saint-Dizier. The three people on board are rescued.
- 31 March – Marine Le Pen from the National Rally (RN) is banned from running for political office for five years following her conviction for embezzlement, making her ineligible to run in the 2027 French presidential election.

=== April ===
- 5 April –
  - The 2025 French far-right protests begin.
  - Paris Saint-Germain wins the 2024–25 Ligue 1 after defeating Angers 1-0.
- 7 April – A massive fire destroys the Syctom recycling plant in Paris.
- 14 April – Algeria orders the expulsion of 12 French diplomats in retaliation for France indicting three Algerians for the 2024 abduction of dissident Amir Boukhors in Paris. In retaliation, France expels 12 Algerian diplomats the next day.
- 15 April – Unknown individuals launch overnight attacks on prisons in Toulon, Aix-en-Provence, Marseille, Valence, Nîmes, Villepinte and Nanterre.
- 24 April – Nantes school stabbing: One person is killed while three others are injured in a stabbing at a school in Nantes. The attacker is arrested.
- 25 April – A Malian national is fatally stabbed in a suspected Islamophobic attack inside a mosque in La Grand-Combe. The suspect subsequently surrenders to police in Italy.
- 28 April – A massive blackout hits parts of Europe, causing power outages in southern France.

=== May ===
- 11 May – Algeria orders the expulsion of 15 French diplomats, citing breaches of diplomatic procedures related in part to the replacement of staff expelled in the previous round of removals in April.
- 13 May –
  - A court in Paris convicts actor Gérard Depardieu of sexually assaulting two women on a film set and sentences him to a suspended 18 month prison sentence.
  - One person is killed in a flash flood in Fort-de-France, Martinique.
- 16 May – France files a case at the International Court of Justice against Iran accusing it of violating the rights of two French nationals arrested and imprisoned in the country since 2022 and holding them hostage.
- 17 May – France's Louane finishes in seventh place at Eurovision 2025 in Switzerland with the single "Maman".
- 18 May – An air traffic control systems failure causes massive disruptions at Paris-Orly Airport.
- 20 May – Three people are killed in adverse conditions caused by thunderstorms in Le Lavandou and Vidauban.
- 24 May –
  - A suspected arson attack on an electricity substation in Tanneron causes a blackout that affects 160,000 homes in Alpes-Maritimes, including in Cannes.
  - Iranian film director Jafar Panahi wins the Palme d'Or at the 2025 Cannes Film Festival for his film It Was Just an Accident.
- 25 May – A second suspected arson attack on an electricity substation in Nice causes a blackout that affects 45,000 homes in the city as well as in Saint-Laurent-du-Var and Cagnes-sur-Mer.
- 28 May – Surgeon and convicted paedophile Joël Le Scouarnec is sentenced to 20 years' imprisonment for abusing 299 patients including children from 1989 to 2014.
- 31 May –
  - Paris Saint-Germain defeats Inter Milan 5-0 to win the UEFA Champions League for the first time. Following this, two people are killed in incidents in Dax and Paris during victory celebrations, while a police officer is severely injured in a related incident in Coutances. At least 294 others are arrested.
  - A Tunisian national is shot dead in a suspected hate crime in Puget-sur-Argens.

=== June ===
- 6 June –
  - Four people are killed in a fire at a housing block in Reims.
  - A rabbi is injured in a suspected antisemitic attack in Neuilly-sur-Seine.
- 9–13 June – Third United Nations Oceans Conference in Nice.
- 10 June – An educational assistant is fatally stabbed by a 14-year old student at a school in Nogent, Haute-Marne.
- 14 – 15 June – 2025 24 Hours of Le Mans
- 15 June – The government revokes the awarding of the Legion of Honour to former president Nicolas Sarkozy, citing his conviction for corruption and influence peddling in 2024.
- 16 June –
  - A strike is held by employees of the Louvre in protest over overcrowding, understaffing and "untenable" working conditions.
  - One person dies in an outbreak of food poisoning in Saint-Quentin, Aisne that leaves seven others hospitalized.
- 17 June – Former prime minister François Fillon is sentenced to a suspended four-year prison term for providing a fake parliamentary assistant job to his wife, Penelope.
- 21 June – At least 12 people are arrested following a wave of suspected syringe attacks that injure 145 people nationwide during the Fete de la Musique.
- 22 June – Two people are killed in a gun attack on a wedding party in Goult.
- 24 June –
  - An appeals court in Nantes finds the French state liable for the death of a 50-year-old man who died in 2016 after inhaling hydrogen sulphide gases emitted by piled-up green algae while running along an estuary near Saint-Brieuc.
  - The French fraud prevention and consumer protection agency (DGCCRF) orders the French subsidiary of Tesla, Inc. to stop "deceptive commercial practices" after finding that it had engaged in multiple violations regarding refunds, deliveries and marketing.
- 25 June – More than 600 metres of cable are severed or stolen from the Eurostar railway line south of Lille-Europe station, causing travel disruptions.
- 26 June – Two people are killed, including a child, and 17 others are injured nationwide following storms that also cause flooding in Paris.
- 27 June – The National Assembly votes for Mayotte to become a single community.
- 28 June – The government issues a decree prohibiting smoking in several public spaces and potential gathering spaces for children. Electronic cigarettes are exempt from the ban.
- 30 June – A strike is held by public media agencies in response to proposals by the government to merge France Médias Monde, France Télévisions, Radio France and the Institut national de l'audiovisuel into a single body.

=== July ===
- 1 July – 2025 European heatwaves: An American tourist dies at the Palace of Versailles in Paris amid an ongoing heatwave.
- 2 July –
  - Prime Minister Bayrou survives a no-confidence motion filed against him in the National Assembly by the Socialist Party following the failure of negotiations over pension reform.
  - Three executives of Ubisoft are sentenced to suspended prison terms of up to three years for sexual and psychological harassment in the workplace.
- 3 July – Air traffic controllers go on strike to protest against outdated equipment, overstaffing, and "toxic management culture". Flights are delayed or canceled across the country, including at Charles de Gaulle Airport in Paris.
- 5 July –
  - The Seine River in Paris is reopened to public swimming for the first time since 1923.
  - A gynaecologist from Bonneville is sentenced to 10 years' imprisonment by a court in Haute-Savoie for the rape of nine patients.
- 5–27 July – 2025 Tour de France
- 6 July – Twenty-four people are injured in a bee attack in Aurillac.
- 7 July – The Cour de Justice de la République dismisses a case filed in 2020 against the government of then-prime minister Edouard Philippe over its response to the COVID-19 pandemic in France.
- 12 July –
  - The French government announces an agreement providing for more autonomy for New Caledonia, including the creation of the "state of Caledonia" and creation of Caledonian nationality alongside French nationality.
  - The Megaliths of Carnac and Morbihan are designated as World Heritage Sites by UNESCO.
- 14 July – Rapes of Gisèle Pelicot: The government awards Gisèle Pelicot with the Legion of Honour award, the highest civil order of merit in the country, for her courage in testifying against her decades-long sexual abuse.
- 17 July –
  - The Court of Appeal of Paris orders the release and immediate expulsion from France of Lebanese leftwing militant Georges Ibrahim Abdallah, who had been convicted for the killings of American diplomat Charles R. Ray and Israeli diplomat Yacov Bar-Simantov in 1982 and detained since 1984. He is released and deported on 25 July.
  - France returns Camp Geille and a nearby airbase to Senegal, marking the end of a permanent French military presence in west and central Africa.
- 20 July – Demolition by detonation of the Kennedy Tower in Loos, the tallest residential tower north of Paris.
- 21 July – Three people, including the director of the servicing company Anavim, are sentenced to up to four years' imprisonment by a court in Chalons-en-Champagne for subjecting migrant workers to slave-like conditions in the wine industry in the Champagne wine region.
- 24 July – France announces that it would recognize the State of Palestine effective September.
- 25 July – The Court of Cassation annuls an arrest warrant issued in 2023 against then-Syrian president Bashar al-Assad over the 2013 Ghouta chemical attack, citing presidential immunity.
- 26 July – A car participating at a motor rally veers off the road and crashes into spectators near Ambert, killing three people.
- 28 July – Three people are killed while two others are reported missing in a fire that hits a holiday home for disabled persons in Montmoreau.

=== August ===
- 1–25 August – Réunion competes in the 13th Indian Ocean Youth Games, winning 138 medals (59 gold, 49 silver, 30 bronze), with 92% of medalists from Saint-Denis.
- 3 August – Pauline Ferrand-Prévot wins the 2025 Tour de France Femmes, becoming the first French person since 1989 to win in any category of the Tour de France since 1989.
- 5 August – One person is killed while three others are reported in a wildfire in Aude that burns 16,000 ha (40,000 acres) of land and becomes the largest wildfire in France since 1949.
- 7 August – The Constitutional Council strikes down a provision in an agricultural measure known as the Duplomb Law that would have allowed the use of the pesticide acetamiprid, which had been banned in France since 2018 for its adverse effects on bees and other pollinators.
- 11 August – The Gravelines Nuclear Power Station shuts down after its cooling system is clogged by a swarm of jellyfish.
- 12 August – A letter from President Macron to Cameroonian president Paul Biya is released in which the French government officially acknowledges its actions against the Cameroonian independence movement from 1945 to 1971 as a war.
- 13 August – An olive tree planted in memory of Ilan Halimi, a French Jew who was murdered in 2006, is cut down in Épinay-sur-Seine in a suspected anti-semitic attack.
- 22 August – A leisure park manager in Porté-Puymorens is arrested on suspicion of discrimination after denying entry to a group of Israeli tourists.
- 24 August – The French foreign ministry summons US ambassador Charles Kushner after he publicly accuses the French government of failing to adequately respond against anti-Semitism.
- 25–31 August – 2025 BWF World Championships in Paris
- 26 August – The skull of the Malagasy King Toera of Menabe, who was killed by French colonial soldiers in 1897, is returned to Madagascar along with the skulls of two of his companions by France, where they had been stored at the National Museum of Natural History in Paris.
- 30 August – One person is killed in a car-ramming attack outside a bar in Evreux.

=== September ===
- 2 September –
  - A Tunisian resident is shot dead by police after injuring five people in a knife attack in Marseille.
  - A court in France issues an arrest warrant for former Syrian president Bashar al-Assad and six other officials of his regime over the bombing of a press centre in Homs that killed journalists Marie Colvin and Remi Ochlik during the Syrian civil war in 2012.
- 3 September – The Commission nationale de l'informatique et des libertés issues a €325 million ($380 million) fine to Google, Inc. and a €150 million ($175 million) to Shein for failed to secure users' free and informed consent before setting advertising cookies on their browsers.
- 4 September –
  - The French women’s boxing team is barred from competing in the World Boxing Championships in the United Kingdom due to late delivery of results of gender tests mandated by World Boxing.
  - Three Chinese porcelain works designated as national treasures and valued at €9.5 million are stolen following a heist at the Musée national Adrien-Dubouché in Limoges.
- 8 September – Prime Minister Bayrou loses a no-confidence motion filed against him in the National Assembly amid a dispute over the national debt. He submits his resignation the next day.
- 9 September – President Macron appoints armed forces minister Sébastien Lecornu as prime minister.
- 10 September –
  - Three migrants trying to reach the United Kingdom die in an incident in the English Channel off the coast of Pas-de-Calais.
  - Nationwide protests break out against the appointment of Sébastien Lecornu as prime minister, resulting in at least 295 arrests.
  - Two people are injured in a knife attack at a horticultural college in Antibes.
- 12 September – The International Court of Justice rules in favor of the French government selling a luxury mansion in Paris that was seized in 2012 from Equatorial Guinea during a corruption investigation against Equatoguinean vice president Teodoro Nguema Obiang Mangue.
- 16 September – Multiple gold artefacts valued at €600,000 are stolen following a heist at the National Museum of Natural History in Paris.
- 18 September – A series of nationwide transport strikes are held in protest against the government.
- 19 September –
  - French authorities announce the arrest by the Palestinian Authority in the West Bank of Hicham Harb, who is accused of overseeing the Chez Jo Goldenberg restaurant attack in Paris in 1982.
  - France suspends counterterrorism cooperation with Mali and expels two Malian diplomats; Mali then expels five French embassy staff.
- 22 September – France formally recognizes the State of Palestine.
- 25 September – Former president Nicolas Sarkozy is sentenced to five years' imprisonment for criminal conspiracy over alleged Libyan financing in the 2007 French presidential election. He is the first former French president to be sent to prison.
- 27 September –
  - Two Somali migrants die during an attempted crossing of the English Channel to the United Kingdom near Neufchâtel-Hardelot.
  - Lac du Bourget and the tidal zone between the Loire and Vilaine rivers are designated as biosphere reserves by UNESCO.
- 30 September – South African Ambassador Nathi Mthethwa is found dead at the Hyatt Regency Paris Étoile in a suspected suicide.

=== October ===
- 1 October – The French Navy boards the Beninese-flagged vessel Boracay, which is under EU sanctions on suspicion of being part of the Russian shadow fleet, and detain two senior crew members off the western French coast on suspicion of involvement in the launching of drones over Danish airspace in the previous week.
- 2 October – Nationwide strikes are held demanding in protest against cuts to government spending and demanding higher taxes on the rich.
- 6 October –
  - Sébastien Lecornu resigns as prime minister hours after unveiling his cabinet.
  - A court in Bobigny sentences Japan Football Association technical director Masanaga Kageyama to a suspended 18-month prison term and a ban on entering France for 10 years after he was arrested at Charles de Gaulle Airport for viewing child pornography aboard an Air France flight.
- 9 October – Husamettin Dogan, the only defendant in the rapes of Gisèle Pelicot case who appealed his conviction, has his sentence extended from nine to 10 years.
- 10 October – President Macron reappoints Sébastien Lecornu as prime minister.
- 13 October –
  - Philippe Aghion of the Collège de France is awarded the Nobel Prize for Economics for his work on "innovation-driven economic growth".
  - Four people are arrested on suspicion of involvement in a plot to assassinate exiled Russian dissident Vladimir Osechkin, who is residing in Biarritz.
- 16 October – Prime Minister Lecornu survives two successive no-confidence motions filed by La France Insoumise and the National Rally respectively.
- 17 October – A court in Albi convicts and sentences Cédric Jubillar to 30 years' imprisonment for the murder of his wife, Delphine Jubillar, who disappeared in 2020.
- 19 October – Eight jewelry items from the Napoleonic era that form part of the French Crown Jewels are stolen following a heist that targeted the Galerie d'Apollon at the Louvre in Paris.
- 20 October – A tornado hits Val-d'Oise, killing one person, injuring four others and causing extensive damage in Ermont.
- 21 October –
  - Former president Nicolas Sarkozy begins a five-year prison sentence for corruption involving his election campaign finances.
  - A court in Paris convicts TotalEnergies for "misleading commercial practices" by overstating its climate pledges.
- 31 October – The National Assembly votes 228–172 to reject a proposal by left-wing parties to introduce a minimum two-percent tax on wealth over 100 million euros ($115 million).

=== November ===
- 1 November – Four Bulgarian nationals are sentenced to up to four years' imprisonment for vandalizing the Mémorial de la Shoah in Paris in an attack blamed by authorities to a Russian destabilization campaign.
- 5 November –
  - Ten people are injured, including two critically, in a vehicle-ramming attack on Oléron Island. The perpetrator is arrested by the gendarmerie.
  - The world's first physical Shein store opens at the Bazar de l'Hôtel de Ville in Paris.
- 6 November – Four people are arrested for disrupting a concert by the Israel Philharmonic Orchestra at the Philharmonie de Paris as part of protest actions against the Gaza war.
- 10 November – A court orders the conditional release of Nicolas Sarkozy pending an appeal
- 13 November – France qualifies for the 2026 FIFA World Cup after defeating Ukraine 4-0 at the 2026 FIFA World Cup qualification in the Parc des Princes.
- 14 November – A knife-wielding assailant is shot and injured by police at Gare Montparnasse in Paris. A bystander is also injured by gunfire.
- 17 November – President Macron signs a law posthumously promoting captain Alfred Dreyfus into a brigadier general.
- 25 November – Three people are arrested in Paris on suspicion of spying for Russia.
- 26 November — The Court of Cassation upholds Nicolas Sarkozy's conviction for illegal campaign financing.
- 30 November — Five people are killed in a house fire in Neuves-Maisons.

=== December ===
- 4 December — Unidentified drones are seen flying over the Île Longue submarine base.
- 9 December – The National Assembly votes 247-234 to pass the government's contested social security budget.
- 12 December – A herd of 200 cows is culled in Les Bordes-sur-Arize following a discovery of a single case of Lumpy skin disease, triggering protests by farmers over the government's response to the outbreak.
- 15 December – A three-day strike is launched by employees of the Louvre as part of demands for more recruitment and better maintenance.
- 18 December – Besançon poisonings: Frédéric Péchier, an anesthesiologist who was found guilty of poisoning 30 patients and killing 12 with anesthetic infusion bags in Besançon is sentenced to life in prison.
- 20 December – A knife-wielding assailant is shot dead by police after threatening bystanders and residents at a shop in Ajaccio.
- 22 December – A cyberattack is carried out by the pro-Russian hacking group Noname057(16) on La Poste.
- 23 December –
  - Severe flooding caused by torrential rain leaves over 1,000 homes without power in Montpellier and Hérault department.
  - The United States imposes sanctions on former EU commissioner for digital affairs Thierry Breton on charges of online censorship following the passage of the Digital Services Act.
- 26 December – A man is arrested after carrying out a knife attack that injures three women in different locations along the Paris Métro Line 3.

== Holidays ==
- 1 January – New Year's Day
- 18 April – Good Friday†
- 20 April – Easter
- 21 April – Easter Monday
- 1 May – International Workers' Day
- 8 May – Victory Day
- 29 May – Ascension Day
- 8 June – Whit Sunday
- 9 June – Whit Monday
- 14 July – Bastille Day
- 15 August – Assumption Day
- 1 November – All Saints' Day
- 11 November – Armistice Day
- 25 December – Christmas Day
- 26 December – Saint Stephen's Day†

†Good Friday and St Stephen's Day are observed in Alsace and Moselle only

== Deaths ==
=== January ===
- 1 January:
  - Jean-Michel Defaye, 92, composer and pianist.
  - Louis Schittly, 86, physician and humanitarian (Médecins Sans Frontières).
- 3 January: La Chunga, 87, French-born Spanish flamenco dancer and painter.
- 4 January: Claude Allègre, 87, geochemist and politician, minister of national education (1997–2000).
- 5 January:
  - Benoît Allemane, 82, voice actor.
  - Anne-Marie Comparini, 77, politician, deputy (2002–2007) and president of Rhône-Alpes (1999–2004).
  - Freddy Zix, 89, footballer (Pierrots Vauban Strasbourg, RC Strasbourg, 1968 Olympics).
- 7 January:
  - Jean-Marie Le Pen, 96, founder of the Front National.
  - Lim Kimya, 73, French-Cambodian politician, MP (2013–2018).
- 8 January: Gabriel de Broglie, 93, historian, chancellor of the Institut de France (2006–2017) and member of the Académie Française.
- 10 January:
  - Roger Lebranchu, 102, Olympic rower (1948).
  - Jean-Luc Petitrenaud, 74, food critic and television host.
- 17 January: Didier Guillaume, 65, senator (2008–2018), minister of agriculture and food (2018–2020), minister of state of Monaco (since 2024).
- 20 January: Bertrand Blier, 85, film director.
- 21 January: Valérie André, 102, neurosurgeon, aviator and army general.
- 22 January: Gabriel Yacoub, 72, folk musician (Malicorne).

=== February ===
- 3 February: Stéphane Picq, 59, video game music composer (Dune, MegaRace, Lost Eden).
- 6 February: Paul-Loup Sulitzer, 78, financier and author.
- 7 February: Naâman, 34, reggae singer.

=== May ===
- 17 May: Werenoi, 31, rapper.
- 26 May: Marcel Ophuls, 97, German-born filmmaker.
- 30 May: Étienne-Émile Baulieu, 98, biochemist and endocrinologist.

=== June ===
- 4 June: Nicole Croisille, 88, singer and actress (Erotissimo, Les Uns et les Autres, There Were Days... and Moons).
- 14 June: Catherine Delbarre, 100, Olympic fencer (1956, 1960).

=== July ===
- 4 July: Jacques Marinelli, 99, racing cyclist.
- 7 July: Olivier Marleix, 54, MP (since 2012).
- 10 July: Bun Hay Mean, 43, comedian.

=== August ===
- 14 August: Eddy Kaspard, 24, footballer (Tahiti national football team).

=== September ===
- 1 September: Christian Brincourt, 90, journalist.
- 23 September: Ziad Takieddine, 75, Lebanese-French arms dealer.
- 27 September: Georg Stefan Troller, 103, Austrian-born journalist, screenwriter and director.

=== October ===
- 20 October: Gilbert Bouchet, 78, senator (since 2014).
- 30 October:
  - Charles Coste, 101, pursuit cyclist, Olympic champion (1948).
  - Vincent Malerba, 100, resistance member and Buchenwald concentration camp survivor.
- 31 October: Tchéky Karyo, 72, Turkish-born actor (The Missing, La Femme Nikita, La Balance).

=== November ===
- 16 November: Xavier Emmanuelli, 87, doctor and politician, co-founder of Médecins Sans Frontières.
- 17 November: Jean-Marie Petitclerc, 72, Roman Catholic priest.
- 18 November:
  - André Chandernagor, 104, deputy (1958–1981), mayor of Mortroux (1953–1983) and president of the Cour des Comptes (1983–1993).
  - Camille Dufour, 100, trade unionist and mayor of Le Creusot (1977–1995).
- 20 November: Tommy Recco, 91, convicted serial killer.
- 22 November:
  - Robert Birenbaum, 99, resistance fighter.
  - Claude Pringalle, 94, Belgian-born French politician, three-time deputy, mayor of Séranvillers-Forenville (1977–2008).
- 28 November: Alain Jamet, 91, politician, co-founder of the National Rally.

=== December ===
- 9 December: Jean-Pierre Winter, 74, psychoanalyst and writer.
- 12 December: Edmond Lauret, 76, politician, senator of Réunion (1995–2001).
- 26 December: Jean-Louis Gasset, 72, football player (Montpellier) and manager (Montpellier, Ivory Coast national team).
- 28 December: Brigitte Bardot, 91, actress (And God Created Woman, Contempt, La Vérité) and animal rights activist.

== See also ==
=== Country overviews ===
- History of France
- History of modern France
- Outline of France
- Government of France
- Politics of France
- Years in France
- Timeline of France history
