= Propofol hemisuccinate =

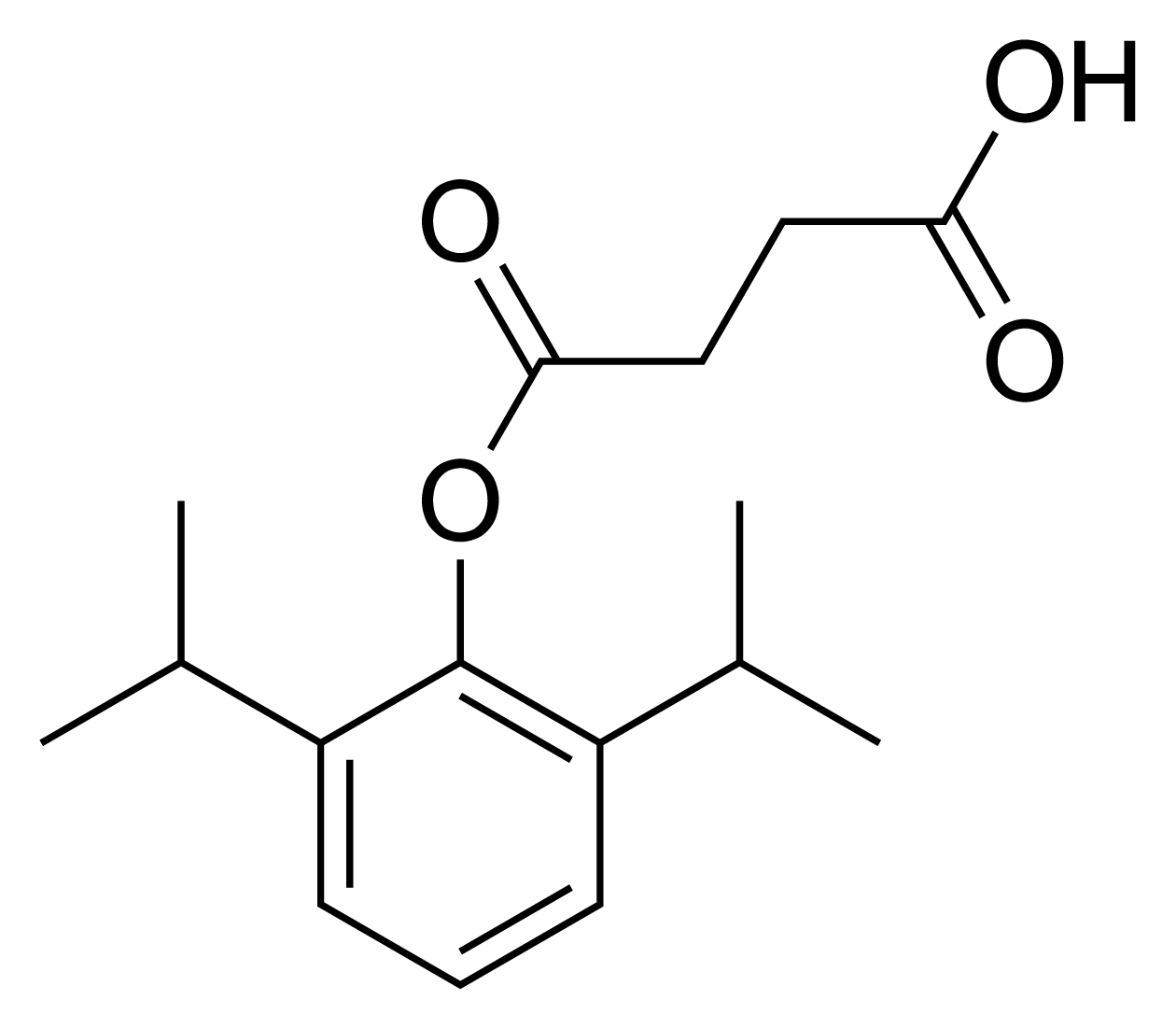

Clinical data
- Other names: EP-102; EP102; EP-103; EP102
- Routes of administration: Oral, inhalation
- Drug class: GABA_{A} receptor positive allosteric modulator; Anesthetic

Identifiers
- IUPAC name: 4-[2,6-di(propan-2-yl)phenoxy]-4-oxobutanoic acid
- CAS Number: 184869-48-5
- PubChem CID: 9925625
- DrugBank: DB16947
- ChemSpider: 8101260
- UNII: OIC0UYZ1W6

Chemical and physical data
- Formula: C_{16}H_{22}O_{4}
- Molar mass: 278.348 g·mol^{−1}
- 3D model (JSmol): Interactive image
- SMILES: CC(C)C1=C(C(=CC=C1)C(C)C)OC(=O)CCC(=O)O
- InChI: InChI=1S/C16H22O4/c1-10(2)12-6-5-7-13(11(3)4)16(12)20-15(19)9-8-14(17)18/h5-7,10-11H,8-9H2,1-4H3,(H,17,18); Key:ORMHJJCIJXWHFH-UHFFFAOYSA-N

Propofol hemisuccinate (developmental code names EP-102 and EP-103) is an anesthetic drug which is an ester substituted prodrug of propofol. Propofol itself is a viscous, oily liquid which does not dissolve in water and has to be formulated as an oil-in-water emulsion. Propofol hemisuccinate is a modified form of propofol which can be made into a water-soluble salt, and can be administered by routes such as by inhalation which are impossible with the unmodified propofol parent compound. It has improved neuroprotective properties compared to propofol. The drug is under development for the treatment of migraine and epilepsy.

== See also ==
- List of investigational headache and migraine drugs
- Cipepofol
- Etomidate
- Fospropofol
- Oxazepam hemisuccinate
- PF0713
