= PF0713 =

Clinical data
- Drug class: GABA_{A} receptor positive allosteric modulator; Anesthetic

Identifiers
- IUPAC name: 2,6-bis[(2R)-butan-2-yl]phenol
- CAS Number: 1083093-47-3
- PubChem CID: 6999842
- ChemSpider: 5367361
- UNII: O7I72847Y3
- ChEMBL: ChEMBL4104388

Chemical and physical data
- Formula: C_{14}H_{22}O
- Molar mass: 206.329 g·mol^{−1}
- 3D model (JSmol): Interactive image
- SMILES: CC[C@@H](C)C1=C(C(=CC=C1)[C@H](C)CC)O
- InChI: InChI=1S/C14H22O/c1-5-10(3)12-8-7-9-13(14(12)15)11(4)6-2/h7-11,15H,5-6H2,1-4H3/t10-,11-/m1/s1; Key:FHTGJZOULSYEOB-GHMZBOCLSA-N

PF0713 ((R,R)-2,6-di-sec-butylphenol) is a sedative and anesthetic drug related to propofol. It was first discovered in 1980 as part of the research which led to propofol itself, and was found to be of similar potency but with a longer duration of action than propofol. However, it was only assayed at this time as the racemic mixture of isomers, and the most active (R,R) stereoisomer was not isolated and tested individually until 2009. While the related compound cipepofol was ultimately adopted for clinical use, PF0713 has similarly been researched for potential medical applications, and while it has not been adopted for clinical use, it continues to be used in research.

== See also ==
- Fospropofol
- Propofol hemisuccinate
