= C14H22O =

The molecular formula C_{14}H_{22}O (molar mass: 206.324 g/mol) may refer to:

- α-Isomethyl ionone (alpha-Isomethyl ionone)
- Cashmeran
- 2,4-Di-tert-butylphenol
- 2,6-Di-tert-butylphenol
- Irones
- Norpatchoulenol
- PF0713
