= John B. Glen =

British veterinarian

John Baird Glen, also known as Iain Glen, is a Scottish veterinarian. Glen is the first to have synthesised the anaesthetic propofol.

== Biography ==
Born in Scotland, Glen grew up on a small farm. He studied veterinary medicine at the University of Glasgow. After the completion of his study, he became a practicing animal surgeon.

In 1973, while working at Imperial Chemical Industries at Alderley Park, Cheshire, England, Glen studied large series of compounds to identify those with desirable anaesthetic and hypnotic properties, synthesising propofol. Glen was able to solubilise the formula with soybean oil and purified egg lecithin. In 2018, he received the prestigious Lasker Award for discovering propofol.
