= C14H20O =

The molecular formula C_{14}H_{20}O (molar mass: 204.31 g/mol) may refer to:

- Ciprofol
- Lilial
