= Besançon poisonings =

2008–2017 French crimes by an anesthesiologist

Frédéric Péchier
- Born: 22 January 1972 (age 54); Angoulême, France
- Citizenship: French
- Occupation: Anesthesiologist
- Status: Convicted; imprisoned; appeal planned
- Motive: To intervene in emergencies and appear heroic; to discredit colleagues and feed thirst for power
- Convictions: 30 counts of intentional poisoning
- Criminal charges: Intentional poisoning
- Penalty: Life imprisonment with 22-year minimum term

Details
- Victims: 30
- Span of crimes: 2008–2017
- Country: France
- Locations: Saint-Vincent clinic and Franche-Comté Polyclinic, Besançon
- Killed: 12
- Injured: 18 (serious complications)
- Weapons: Contamination of anesthetic infusion bags with overdoses of potassium, local anesthetics (e.g., mepivacaine), adrenaline, or heparin
- Date apprehended: 2017 (initial indictment)
- Imprisoned at: 18 December 2025

The Besançon poisonings was a French legal case resulting in the conviction of French anesthesiologist Frédéric Péchier to a life sentence for intentionally poisoning 30 patients and killing 12.

The poisonings took place in Besançon between 2008 and 2017. A renowned physician in his field, Péchier was found guilty of deliberately inducing cardiac arrest or serious complications in surgical patients by manipulating anesthetic infusion bags in order to position himself to intervene and appear as a savior, known in criminology as an angel of mercy.

The case broke in 2017 when several unusual medical incidents raised alarms. An initial indictment was issued in 2017, expanded in 2019 and then in 2022, covering a total of thirty cases, including twelve fatalities. Péchier maintains his innocence and denounces a lack of direct material evidence. The complex and highly publicized investigation involves medical experts and investigators to determine the practitioner's responsibility.

== Events ==
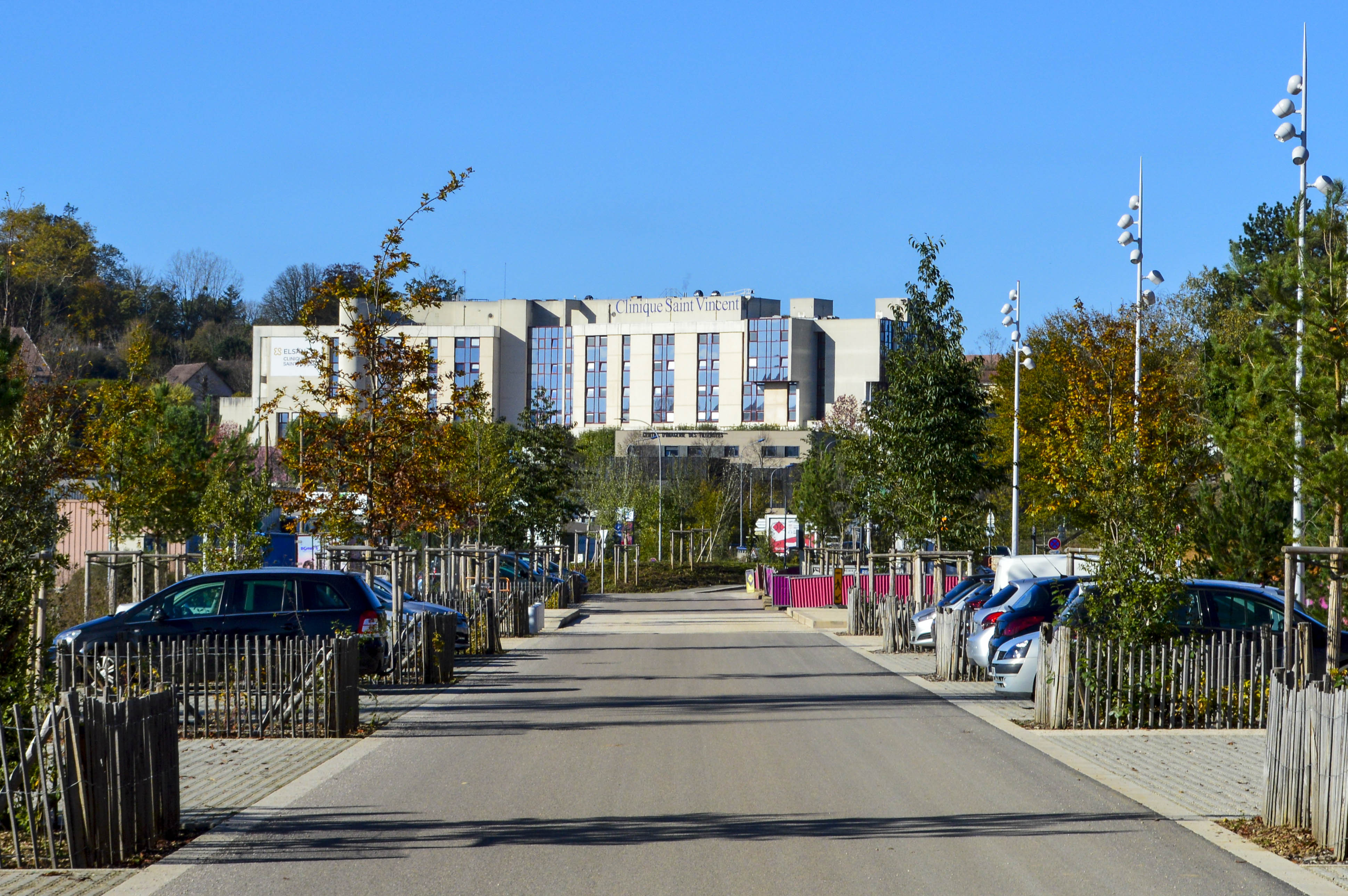
The Saint-Vincent clinic in Besançon.

The physician was first indicted in 2017 for seven poisonings. He was released, placed under judicial supervision, and banned from practicing his profession.

On 20 January 2017, a 70-year-old man undergoing surgery for prostate cancer suffered a cardiac arrest. Tests revealed a massive injection of mepivacaine equivalent to nine times the normal dose. This is the only case in which the physician was directly the referring anesthesiologist and in which a syringe containing the product was found. This case is considered by the prosecution to be the key piece of evidence in the case, but the accused continues to dispute it, citing outside manipulation.

The case was reopened in May 2019, with the anesthesiologist suspected by investigators of poisoning twenty-four people, including a four-year-old child.

These alleged malicious acts, which occurred at the Saint-Vincent clinic and the Franche-Comté Polyclinic in Besançon, are said to have led to fatal cardiac arrests in some cases and serious after-effects in others. On 16 May 2019, after 48 hours of prolonged police custody, the doctor was brought before the judge of liberties, who nevertheless decided not to place him in pre-trial detention.

In December 2025, at the end of a three-month trial, he was convicted to a life sentence.

== Known victims ==
The Frédéric Péchier case, at the start of his trial, involves 30 alleged victims, 12 of whom are deceased.

Date	Name	Age	Status
10 October 2008	Damien Iehlen	53 years old	Deceased
14 October 2008	Suzanne Ziegler	74 years old	Deceased
7 April 2009	Bénedicte B.	41 years old	
27 April 2009	Michel V.	48 years old	
22 June 2009	Nicole D.	65 years old	
8 September 2009	Éric G.	49 years old	
25 September 2009	Sylvie G.	41 years old	
15 September 2010	Monique Varguet	64 years old	Deceased
8 July 2011	Ulysse B.	61 years old	
9 January 2012	Christian P.	63 years old	
19 January 2012	Micheline G.	52 years old	
31 January 2012	Denise M.	80 years old	
5 September 2012	Pascal B.		
11 December 2012	Annie Noblet	66 years old	Deceased
7 February 2013	Monique C.	62 years old	
27 June 2013	Anne-Marie Gaugey	66 years old	Deceased
3 mars 2014	Armand Dos Santos	72 years old	Deceased
10 June 2014	Jean Benoît	79 years old	Deceased
8 January 2015	Odile L.	43 years old	
13 mars 2015	Edith Bongain	89 years old	Deceased
20 April 2015	Sylviane Baugey	57 years old	Deceased
5 October 2015	Christian D.	66 years old	
28 January 2016	Wilhem B.	16 years old	
22 February 2016	Tedy H.	4 years	
14 April 2016	Laurence Nicod	50 years	Deceased
5 September 2016	Kévin B.	26 years old	
31 October 2016	Bertrand Collette	56 years old	Deceased
21 November 2016	Henri Quenillet	73 years old	Deceased
11 January 2017	Sandra Simard	36 years old	
20 January 2017	Jean-Claude Gandon	70 years old	

== See also ==
- Angel of death (criminology)
- Efren Saldivar, a respiratory therapist and serial killer who used paralytics to induce cardiac arrest
