= Oxazepam hemisuccinate =

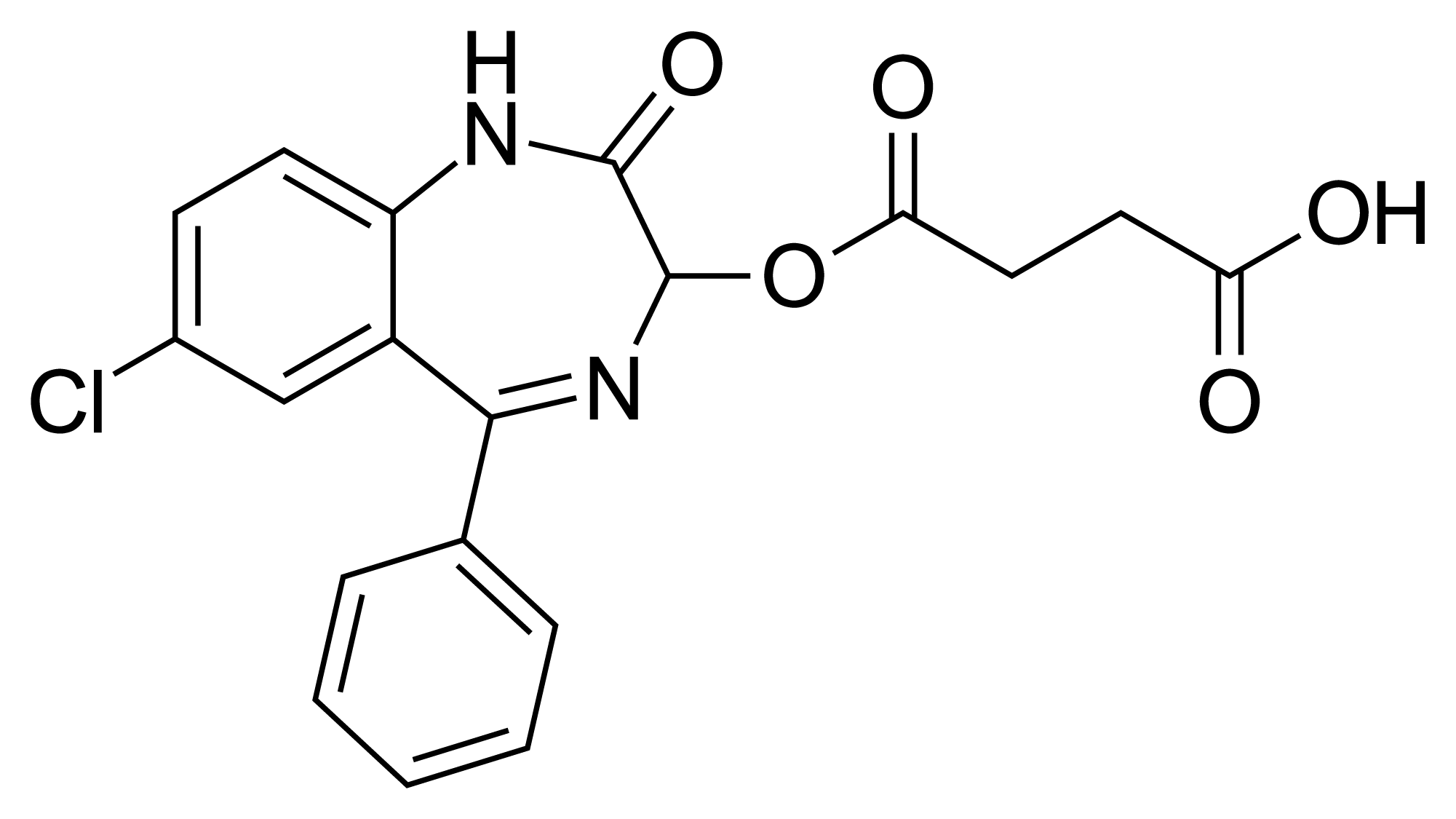

Clinical data
- Trade names: Empracil

Identifiers
- IUPAC name: 4-[(7-chloro-2-oxo-5-phenyl-1,3-dihydro-1,4-benzodiazepin-3-yl)oxy]-4-oxobutanoic acid
- CAS Number: 4700-56-5
- PubChem CID: 36754
- UNII: DCE8700INN
- CompTox Dashboard (EPA): DTXSID70924562
- ECHA InfoCard: 100.022.886

Chemical and physical data
- Formula: C_{19}H_{15}ClN_{2}O_{5}
- Molar mass: 386.79 g·mol^{−1}
- 3D model (JSmol): Interactive image
- SMILES: C1=CC=C(C=C1)C2=NC(C(=O)NC3=C2C=C(C=C3)Cl)OC(=O)CCC(=O)O
- InChI: InChI=1S/C19H15ClN2O5/c20-12-6-7-14-13(10-12)17(11-4-2-1-3-5-11)22-19(18(26)21-14)27-16(25)9-8-15(23)24/h1-7,10,19H,8-9H2,(H,21,26)(H,23,24); Key:UCUOKZUJHTYPJT-UHFFFAOYSA-N

Oxazepam hemisuccinate (Empracil), is a benzodiazepine derivative which is an ester substituted prodrug of oxazepam. It was developed as a water-soluble benzodiazepine suitable for administration by injection, for use as an anxiolytic and for procedural sedation. It was used medically to a limited extent during the 1970s and 1980s under the brand name Empracil, but fell into disuse following the introduction of midazolam, which is similarly water-soluble and is more potent and effective than oxazepam hemisuccinate for the same medical applications. It has two isomers, with the R enantiomer being more effective due to more efficient cleavage of the ester link.

== See also ==
- Luvesilocin
- THC hemisuccinate
- Propofol hemisuccinate
