= Jean-Marie Petitclerc =

French Roman Catholic priest (1953–2025)

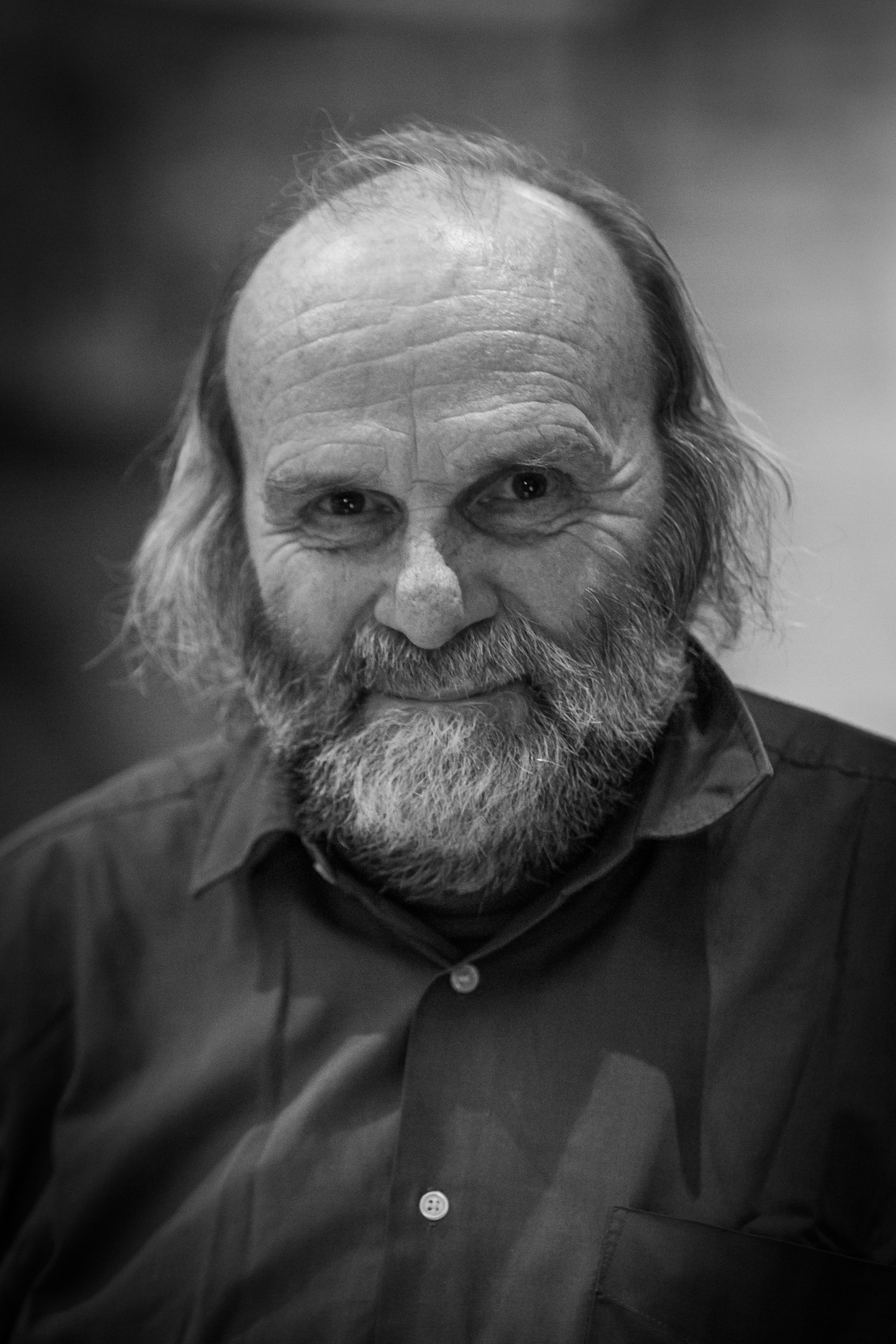
- Petitclerc in 2015
- Born: 2 February 1953; Thiberville, France
- Died: 17 November 2025 (aged 72); Langrune-sur-Mer, France
- Education: École polytechnique
- Occupation: Roman Catholic priest

Jean-Marie Petitclerc (French: [ʒɑ̃maʁi pətiklɛʁ]; 2 February 1953 – 17 November 2025) was a French Roman Catholic priest.

In 1999, 2014, and 2024, he was investigated for sexual misconduct; the first two charges had been dismissed, but he was convicted in the most recent case in October 2025, a decision he appealed.

== Biography ==
Born in Thiberville on 2 February 1953, Petitclerc grew up in a family of doctors and attended the Lycée privé Sainte-Geneviève and the École polytechnique. He founded and directed the Association Le Valdocco, which brought the Salesians of Don Bosco into underprivileged communities and gave mentorship to children. He also directed the Institut de formation aux métiers de la ville in Argenteuil. In 2004, he moved to Tassin-la-Demi-Lune and continued his work with Le Valdocco. In 2007, he was named a special advisor to Minister of Housing Christine Boutin, responsible for coordinating with local stakeholders. He left the position in February 2009 to return to Le Valdocco, particularly the home for at-risk youth in Tassin-la-Demi-Lune. In September 2009, he became the leader of the Institution salésienne Notre-Dame des Minimes. In 2013, he was the recipient of the Prix de l'éthique. In 2014, he retired from his professional career and left Le Valdocco. From 2017 to 2025, he was provincial vicar for the Salesians in France and southern Belgium, during which time he founded "Don Bosco Action Sociale".

=== Legal issues ===
In 1999 and 2014, Petitclerc was investigated for sexual assault, though both cases were dismissed. However, in February 2024, he was charged with sexual assault and voyeurism involving a minor, who was 13 at the time of the alleged offenses in summer 2023. On 14 October 2025, he was convicted of voyeurism and received a six-month suspended sentence, as well as a ban on being alone with minors. He appealed his conviction.

=== Death ===
Petitclerc was found dead on the beach in Langrune-sur-Mer on 17 November 2025, at the age of 72 in an apparent suicide by drowning. He had left messages to his family the previous day expressing the deep impact he had received from the negative press.

== Publications ==
- Éduquer aujourd'hui pour demain : quels repères pour une pratique chrétienne de l'éducation ? (1988)
- Cette prévention dite spécialisée (1988)
- Respecter l'enfant : réflexion sur les droits de l'enfant (1989)
- Le pari éducatif : conflit, handicap, maladie (1991)
- Dire Dieu aux jeunes d'aujourd'hui (1994)
- La banlieue de l'espoir (1995)
- Dire Dieu aux jeunes (1996)
- Le jeune, l'éducateur et la loi (1998)
- La violence et les jeunes (1999)
- Les nouvelles délinquances des jeunes : violences urbaines et réponses éducatives (2001)
- Le Valdocco d'Argenteuil (2001)
- L'IFMV Valdocco, Institut de formation aux métiers de la ville (2001)
- Pratiquer la médiation sociale : Un nouveau métier de la ville au service du lien social (2002)
- Et si on parlait de la violence ? (2002)
- Y'a plus d'autorité (2003)
- Spiritualité de l'éducation : Lecture éducative de pages évangéliques (2003)
- Et si on parlait du suicide des jeunes (2004)
- Enfermer ou éduquer ? : les jeunes et la violence (2004)
- Mon combat contre la violence : entretiens avec Yves de Gentil-Baichis (2005)
- Éducation non violente (2005)
- Tu peux changer le monde ! (2006)
- Accompagner un jeune blessé : sur le chemin d'Emmaüs (2006)
- Chemin de croix (2007)
- Prières glanées (2007)
- À la rencontre des jeunes ... au puits de la Samaritaine (2007)
- Lettre ouverte à ceux qui veulent changer l'école (2007)
- Pour en finir avec les ghettos urbains (2009)
- Pourquoi je suis devenu ... prêtre et éducateur (2009)
- La pédagogie de Don Bosco (2016)
- Prévenir la radicalisation des jeunes (2017)
- Vivre la transmission (2024)
- Combattre l'hyperviolence, relever le défi éducatif (2025)
