= Camille Dufour =

French trade unionist and politician (1925–2025)

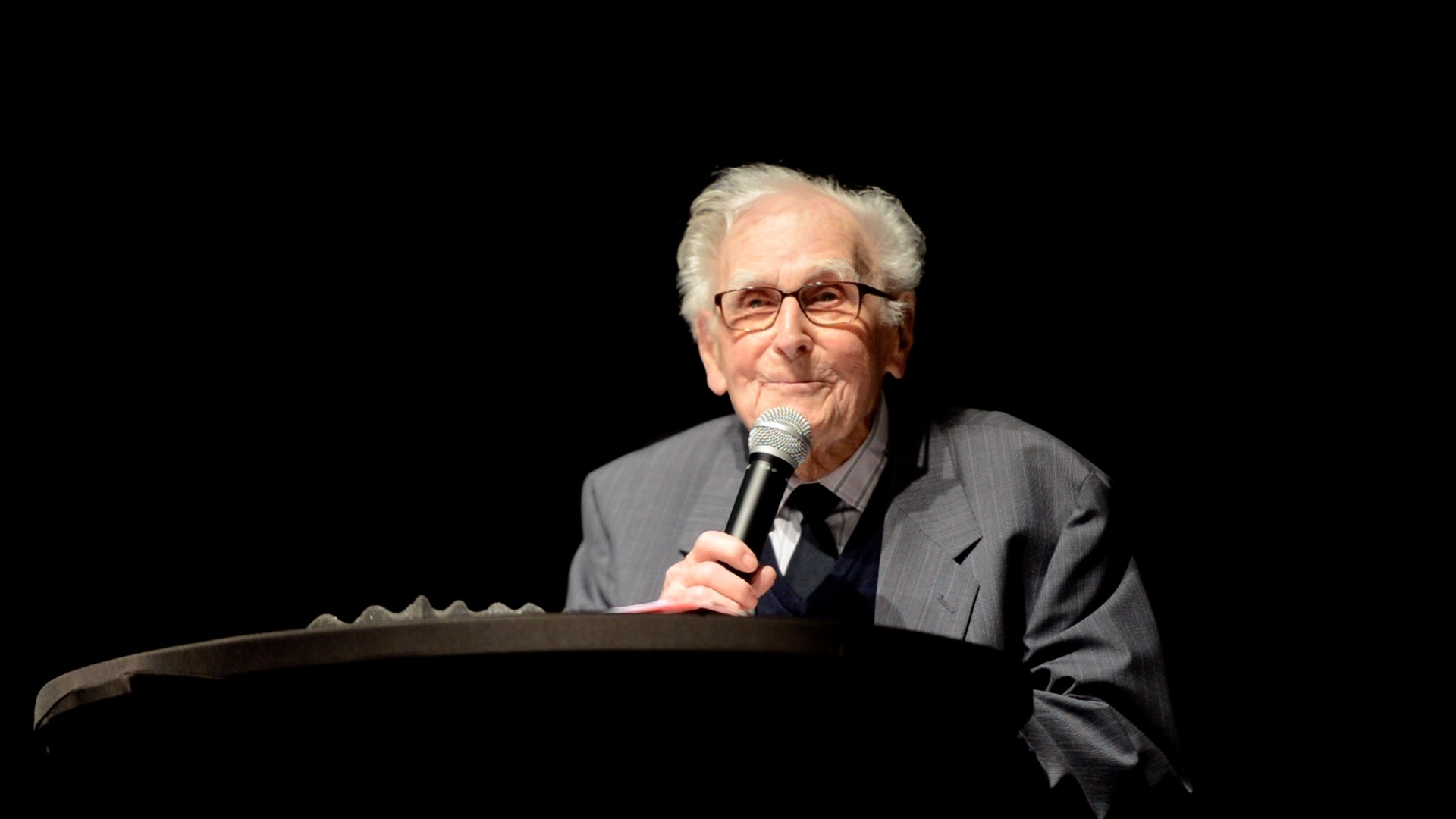
- Dufour in 2020

Mayor of Le Creusot
- In office 1977–1995
- Preceded by: Henri Lacagne
- Succeeded by: André Billardon

Personal details
- Born: 30 September 1925 Bétheny, France
- Died: 18 November 2025 (aged 100)
- Party: PS
- Occupation: Trade unionist

Camille Dufour (French: [kɑmij dyfuʁ]; 30 September 1925 – 18 November 2025) was a French politician of the Socialist Party (PS).

== Life and career ==
Born in Bétheny on 30 September 1925, Dufour was a trade unionist with the French Confederation of Christian Workers and the French Democratic Confederation of Labour. He joined the PS in 1971 and became mayor of Le Creusot in 1977. From 1977 to 1989, he was also president of the Communauté urbaine Creusot Montceau. After the 1995 elections, he retired from politics, though remained active in community engagement and workers' rights.

Dufour died on 18 November 2025, at the age of 100.

== Publications ==
- Le Creusot de 1960 à nos jours (2003)
- Le Creusot, les Quatre-Chemin, la commune libre (with Louis Lagost, 2007)
- Le Creusot, regard sur le passé (with Michel Bouillon, 2010)
