= Target controlled infusion =

Target-controlled infusion (TCI) automates the dosing of intravenous drugs during surgery. After the anesthetist sets the desired parameters in a computer and presses the start button, the system controls the infusion pump, while being monitored by the anesthetist. TCI is as safe and effective as manually controlled infusion.

TCI can be sub-classified according to the target. The suffix 'e' as in TCIe indicates that the target is the effect site, in most cases, the central nervous system or brain. Alternatively, the suffix 'p' denotes plasma, indicating that the device implementing the TCI model is to target the blood plasma. There are important differences in relation to the time taken for effect site equilibration. Studies have demonstrated the clinical safety of the effect-site target model.

Popular TCI models exist for Propofol and the synthetic opioid Remifentanil. The models are based on pharmacokinetic studies and use software embedded in the infusion device. For propofol the Marsh and Schnider models are available and the Minto model is commonly used for remifentanil. In 2017, a project to emulate the TCI models in the python language was published on GitHub.

== History ==
TCI has been used in clinical settings since 1996, initially with propofol.

== See also ==
- General anaesthesia#tci
