= Thiberville =

Commune in the Eure department of France

- Commune
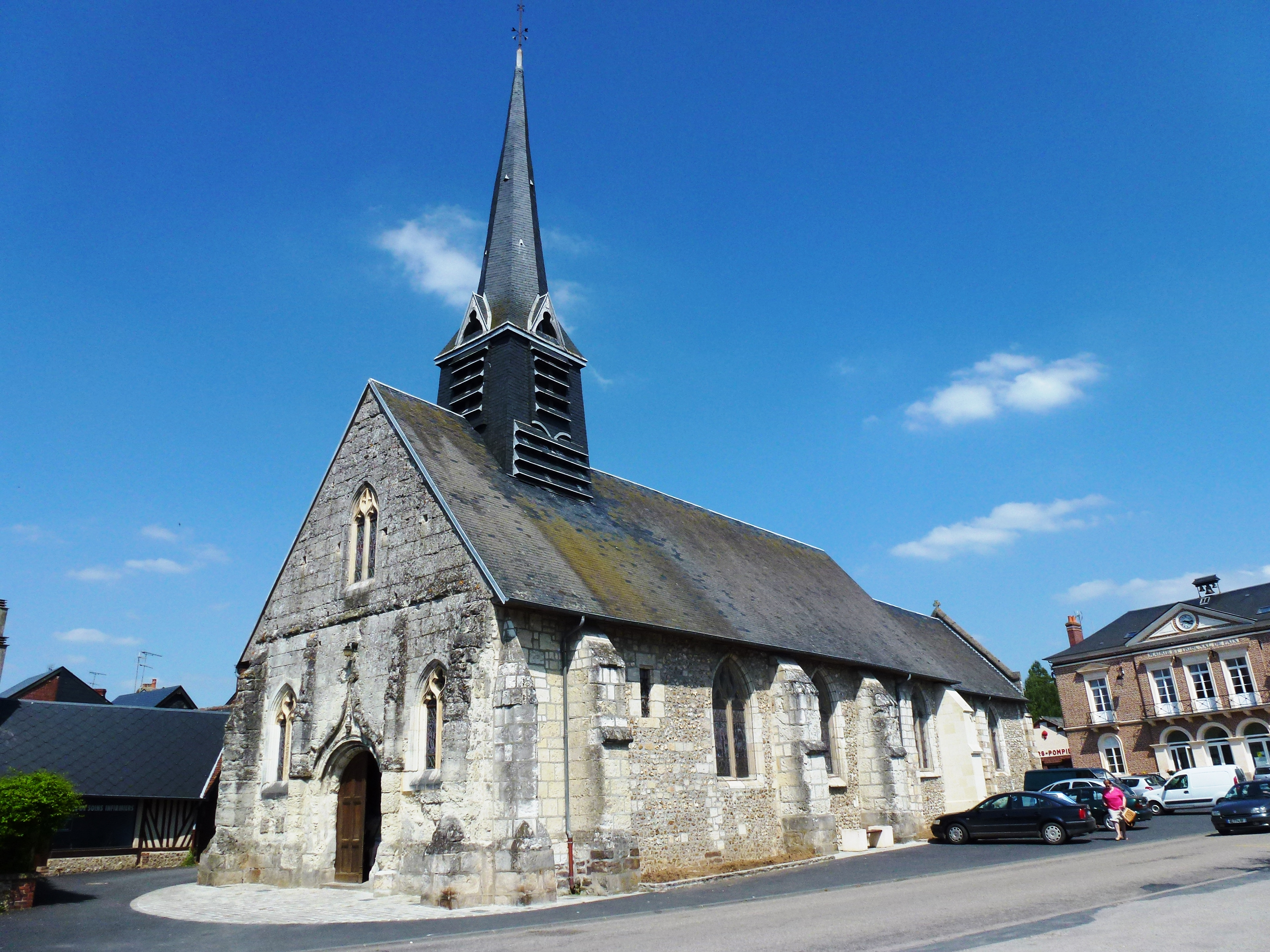
- The church in Thiberville

- Coat of arms
- Location of Thiberville
- Location within France Location within Normandy
- Coordinates: 49°08′19″N 0°27′21″E
- Country: France
- Region: Normandy
- Department: Eure
- Arrondissement: Bernay
- Canton: Beuzeville

Government
  - Mayor (2020–2026): Guy Paris
- Area^{1}: 7.98 km^{2} (3.08 sq mi)
- Elevation: 180 m (590 ft)
- Highest elevation: 188 m (617 ft)
- Lowest elevation: 160 m (520 ft)
- Population (2023): 1,752
  - Density: 220/km^{2} (569/sq mi)
- Time zone: UTC+01:00 (CET)
  - Summer (DST): UTC+02:00 (CEST)
- INSEE/Postal code: 27629 /27230
- ^{1} French Land Register data, which excludes lakes, ponds, glaciers > 1 km^{2} (0.386 sq mi or 247 acres) and river estuaries.

Thiberville (French pronunciation: [tibɛʁvil]) is a commune in the Eure department in Normandy in northern France. It is 15 km east of Lisieux.

In late 2024 the town made the news when Roger Thiberville, a meteorologist in Paris who had inherited a large family property portfolio, left the town almost all of his €10m fortune in his will. His only apparent connection to the town was from his family name, having never even visited himself. The sum represented about five times the annual town budget, and his only request was for his ashes to be placed in the town cemetery.

== Population ==
Historical population
Year	Pop.	±% p.a.
1968	1,374	—
1975	1,483	+1.10%
1982	1,643	+1.47%
1990	1,610	−0.25%
1999	1,537	−0.51%
2007	1,670	+1.04%
2012	1,828	+1.82%
2017	1,800	−0.31%
2023	1,752	−0.45%
Source: INSEE

== See also ==
- Communes of the Eure department
