= 2025 Grenoble attack =

Explosive attack in Grenoble, France

- Location: Olympic Village sector, Grenoble, France
- Date: 12 February 2025; 8:15 p.m. (CET)
- Attack type: Bombing
- Weapons: Grenade, kalashnikov assault rifle (unused)
- Deaths: 0
- Injuries: 15 (6 critically)
- Motive: Under investigation

On 12 February 2025, a grenade was thrown into a bar-restaurant in the Olympic Village district of Grenoble, France. The incident resulted in multiple injuries and significant property damage.

== Attack ==
The attack took place at Aksehir, a bar-restaurant located on Place Claude Kogan in Grenoble's Olympic Village sector, at around 8:15 p.m. CET on February 12, 2025. Prosecutor François Touret-de-Courcy reported that the perpetrator entered the establishment armed with an assault rifle, threw a grenade inside without speaking, and immediately fled the scene. Police investigators subsequently confirmed the explosion was caused by a grenade. The attack caused extensive damage to the establishment, including the destruction of all its windows. Initial reports indicated the explosive device was thrown directly at the business.

The attack resulted in approximately fifteen injuries, with six individuals sustaining critical injuries requiring urgent medical attention. All victims were transported to the Centre Hospitalier Universitaire Grenoble Alpes for treatment.

== Response ==
French emergency services deployed twenty rescue vehicles carrying eighty firefighters to the scene. Law enforcement established a security perimeter and began immediate investigative procedures. Municipal officials, including Deputy Mayor Chloé Pantel, who oversees the Olympic Village neighborhood, responded to the site.

Grenoble Mayor Éric Piolle issued a strong condemnation of the attack on the X, describing it as a "criminal act of extraordinary violence." The mayor also expressed gratitude to emergency services for their response to the incident.
