= 2025 French far-right protests =

Series of protests against Marine Le Pen convictions

- Date: 5–6 April 2025
- Location: France
- Caused by: Conviction of National Rally leader Marine Le Pen for embezzlement in the National Front assistants affair, ruling her ineligible to run in the 2027 French presidential election
- Goals: Overturning Marine Le Pen's ineligibility for elections until 2030
- Methods: Public demonstration

Parties
| National Rally and allies: Reconquête; French Future; Identity-Liberties; Union of the Right for the Republic; Debout la France; The Republicans (factions) | Centre and right-wing opposition: Renaissance; Democratic Movement; Horizons; Union of Democrats and Independents; Radical Party; The Republicans (factions); Left-wing opposition: La France Insoumise; The Ecologists; Socialist Party; French Communist Party; Place Publique; Lutte Ouvriere; New Anticapitalist Party |

Lead figures
| Marine Le Pen; Jordan Bardella; Eric Ciotti; Marion Marechal; Eric Zemmour | Emmanuel Macron; Gabriel Attal; Francois Bayrou; Jean-Luc Mélenchon |

The 2025 French far-right protests are political demonstrations organized by the National Rally and sympathetic organizations protesting the conviction of Marine Le Pen in the National Front assistants affair ruling her ineligible for running for office until 2030. Protests and gatherings occurred on 6 April in central Paris. The protests were met with counter-protests from leftist groups.

== Background ==
On 31 March 2025, National Rally leader and far-right electoral candidate Marine Le Pen and eight other MEPs were convicted of embezzling an estimated €2.9 million in public funds. As a result, Marine Le Pen received a sentence of four years in prison, two of which were to be served under electronic tagging. She was also fined €100,000 and given five years of ineligibility with provisional execution. Most significantly, the court barred Le Pen from running for public office until 2030, effectively preventing her candidacy in the 2027 French presidential election—a race in which polling had shown her as a leading contender. A poll by Odaxa found that most French people view the court decision as fair and unsurprising, and the attacks on judges are generally unpopular, especially among older voters.

Le Pen consistently maintained that the conviction was politically motivated, describing it as a "political decision" rather than a fair judicial ruling. She announced her intention to appeal the verdict. President of National Rally Jordan Bardella denounced Le Pen's conviction as an "attack on democracy" and the result of a "judicial dictatorship". Several European right-wing populist leaders, including Geert Wilders, Matteo Salvini, Viktor Orbán, Robert Winnicki, Tom Van Grieken and Santiago Abascal, expressed their solidarity with Le Pen and condemned the verdict. Several international far-right and right-wing populist political figures released statements in support of Le Pen, including Kremlin spokesman Dmitry Peskov, Israeli Minister of Diaspora Affairs Amichai Chikli, billionaire Elon Musk, and former Brazilian President Jair Bolsonaro. US President Donald Trump reacted to the conviction by drawing a parallel with his own court cases, and the US State Department expressed concern about "excluding people from the political process."

== Protests ==
Following the announcement of her ineligibility, the National Rally party organized for national demonstrations to begin at 14:00 CEST on 6 April at the Place Vauban in central Paris, with several additional demonstrations planned for future dates across the nation. Party officials claimed that approximately 10,000 tickets had been sold for the Paris event.

On 5 April, a protest of about 500 people took place in Marseille in support of Le Pen.

On 6 April, many protesters symbolically assembled near Napoleon's tomb and Les Invalides' golden dome in central Paris. Several protesters brought French flags to wave, and chanted "They won't steal 2027 from us!" and "Marine Présidente!". Many displayed signs with messages such as "Stop the judicial dictatorship" and "Justice taking orders". Other protesters wore shirts bearing the slogan "Je suis Marine" ("I am Marine"). One protester carried a handmade Lady Justice with bent and broken arms.

President of National Rally Jordan Bardella delivered a speech that characterized the day of Le Pen's conviction as "a dark day" in French history and "a wound to patriotic French people." Despite his criticism of the judicial decision, he later tempered his rhetoric by stating that he did not desire to "discredit all judges", or put pressure on democratic institutions, and that he respected the separation of powers. During his address, Bardella encouraged attendees to stay loyal to Le Pen during her legal challenges, saying: "I am sure compatriots, she will be able to count on you. So help her, help her confront this injustice. Stay by her side." He concluded with the declaration: "Long live Marine Le Pen, long live democracy, long live France." Louis Aliot, Vice President of National Rally, and Éric Ciotti, former head of the right-wing Republicans party, also delivered addresses to the demonstrating crowd.

Marine Le Pen herself delivered the final address of the 6 April Paris rally, where she expressed gratitude to her supporters and Bardella before committing to continue battling against what she characterized as an unjust judicial system. She framed the situation as existential, claiming that "the very existence of France is at stake." Le Pen referenced American civil rights leader Martin Luther King Jr.— a comparison she had also made earlier that day during a video appearance for an Italian anti-immigration Lega party meeting in Florence. She stated: "We will follow Martin Luther King as an example. Our fight will be a peaceful fight, a democratic fight." Le Pen characterized the judicial proceedings as a "witch hunt" against her, which Sky News reporters stated was akin to terminology used by United States President Donald Trump. She espoused that what would normally be a settlement between the party and the European Parliament was twisted into a "very harsh conviction," reiterating: "This is not a decision of justice—this is a political decision." Following her speech, the crowd sang La Marseillaise.

== Reactions ==
The Paris Police Prefecture established traffic restrictions beginning at 20:00 CEST on 5 April in advance of the protests, affecting several roadways in the 7th arrondissement.

During the demonstrations on April 6, French President Emmanuel Macron made no direct public comment on the protests. Instead, he posted several messages on social media platform Twitter/X about the Russian invasion of Ukraine, including statements written in Ukrainian calling for strong action against Russia if they delayed ceasefire attempts.

=== Counter-protests ===
Concurrent with the 6 April demonstration in Paris, the centrist Renaissance party, aligned with French President Emmanuel Macron, organized a rally in the Parisian suburb of Saint-Denis, during which secretary general of the Renaissance party Gabriel Attal called for continued commitment to current French political institutions against attacks by the far-right against them and its judges. He accused international far-right politicians such as Prime Minister of Hungary Viktor Orban and US President Donald Trump of "unprecedented interference" in French politics for supporting Le Pen against her convictions and ineligibility to run. Former Defense Minister Florence Parly was among the notable attendees at this gathering.

A separate leftist demonstration took place at the Place de la Republique in Paris. Organized by various left-wing parties including La France Insoumise (LFI) and the French Green Party, this rally attracted an estimated 15,000 participants according to its organizers. Demonstrators carried placards with anti-fascist and anti-Trump messages, and expressed opposition to Le Pen and her party's agenda. LFI politician Manuel Bompard accused National Rally of being a danger to the French rule of law and its democracy.

== See also ==
- History of far-right movements in France
- 2024 French protests against the National Rally
- Protests against Emmanuel Macron
