= Jean-Luc Petitrenaud =

French circus performer (1950–2025)

- Born: 5 December 1950
- Died: 10 January 2025 (aged 74)
- Occupations: Food critic; television personality; writer

Jean-Luc Petitrenaud (5 December 1950 – 10 January 2025) was a French food critic and television personality. In June 2017, he announced that he took a short break from hosting his television show Les escapades de Petitrenaud due to fatigue.

Petitrenaud died on 10 January 2025, at the age of 74.
