= Robert Birenbaum =

French resistance fighter (1926–2025)

Robert Birenbaum (21 July 1926 – 22 November 2025) was a French resistance fighter.

== Biography ==
Birenbaum was born in Paris on 21 July 1926, the son of Polish Jewish born, Moshe and Rywka Birenbaum. His parents, naturalized French citizens in 1935, ran a grocery store in the 19th arrondissement of Paris. A member of the Communist Youth, he chose to join the Resistance at the invitation of his aunt Dora, herself a communist and a resistance fighter.

On 17 July 1942, the day after the Vel d'Hiv roundup from which he had escaped, he joined the Resistance at the age of 15.

In August 1944, he participated in the Liberation of Paris, being in charge of organizing the uprising of the 18th, 19th and 20th arrondissements.

On 18 June 2023, he was awarded the Legion of Honor by President Emmanuel Macron at Mont Valérien.

Birenbaum died on 22 November 2025, at the age of 99.
