= Vincent Malerba =

French resistance member and Holocaust survivor (1925–2025)

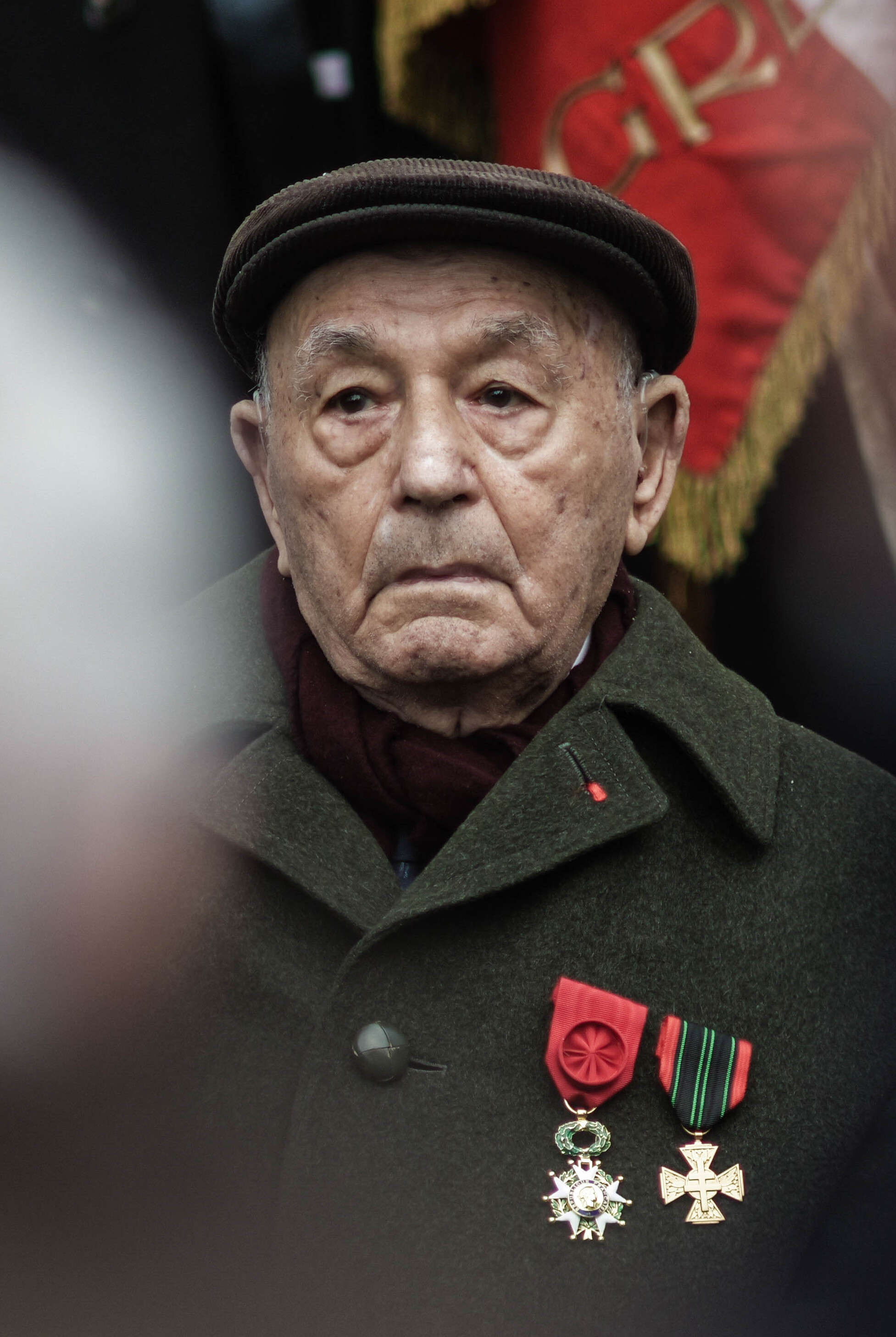
- Born: 7 January 1925; Grenoble, Rhône-Alpes, France
- Died: 30 October 2025 (aged 100)
- Occupations: French resistance member, Holocaust survivor

Vincent Malerba (7 January 1925 – 30 October 2025) was a French resistance member and Holocaust survivor.

== Biography ==
Malerba was born at 34 rue Saint-Laurent in Grenoble, a district nicknamed "Little Italy" at the beginning of the twentieth century. In 1943, he was apprenticed as a welder at the Établissements Bouchayer-Viallet, industrial boilermaking workshops.

On 11 November 1943, aged eighteen years old, he joined the demonstration celebrating the 25th anniversary of the 1918 French victory over Germany, a march banned by the occupying forces, during which 600 demonstrators were arrested. Malerba was detained for a few days in the Bonne barracks, then transferred to the Compiègne camp where he remained for two months, before being sent to Germany to the Dora concentration camp, dependent on Buchenwald, where he was assigned the number 40250. He was assigned to dig a tunnel, then to weld and assemble parts of V1 and V2 missiles.

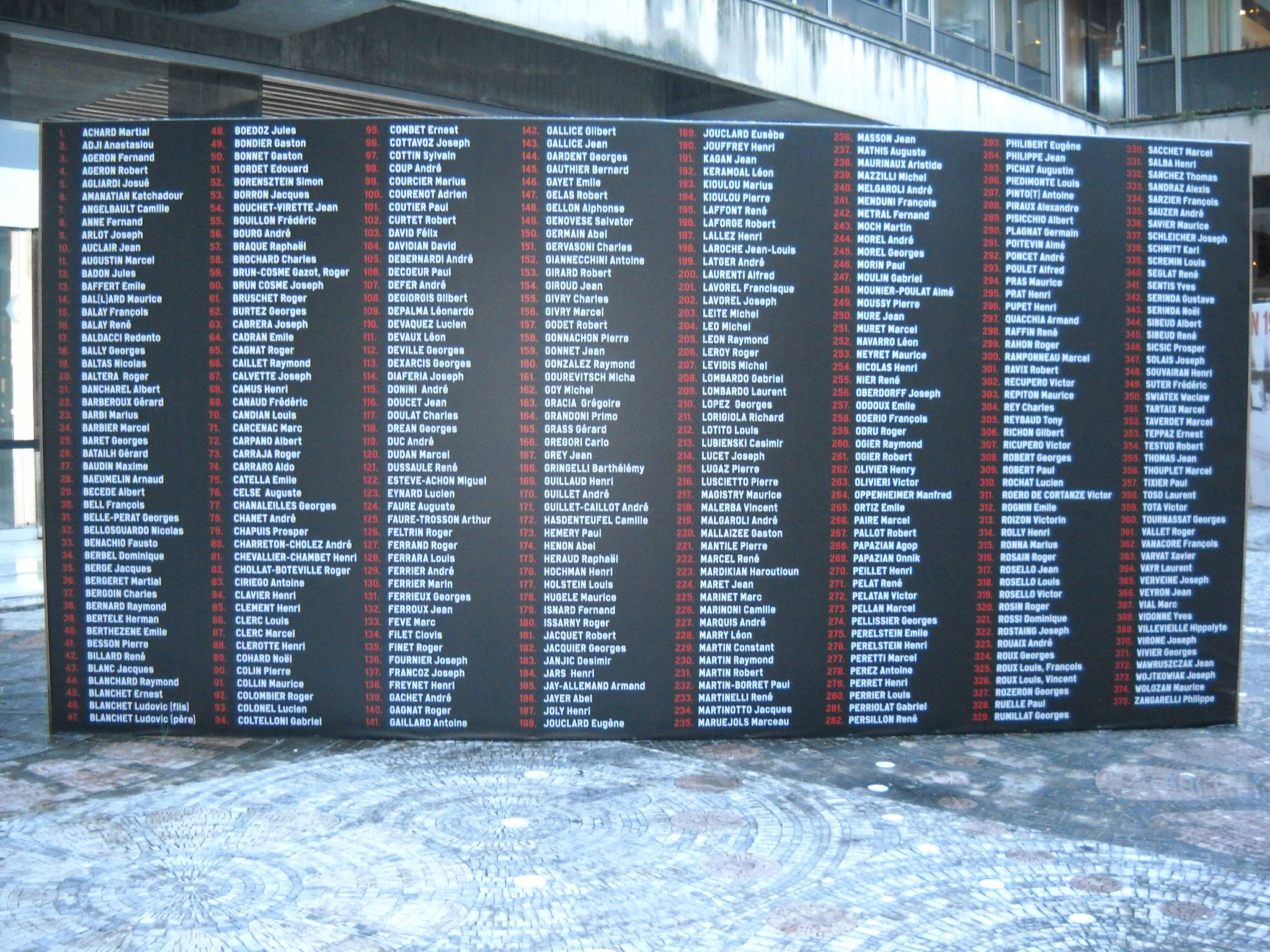
Memorial at the Grenoble City Hall in memory of the November 11, 2013 to the deportees.

Following the end of World War II, he returned to France, and in 2023 was residing in Montbonnot-Saint-Martin.

Malerba died on 30 October 2025, at the age of 100.

== Recognition ==
On 11 November 2013, the city of Grenoble paid tribute and unveiled a memorial to the demonstrators deported in 1943, amongst which Malerba was named.
