= Christian Brincourt =

French journalist (1935–2025)

- Born: 27 July 1935; Neuilly-sur-Seine, France
- Died: 1 September 2025 (aged 90)
- Occupation: Journalist
- Employer: Paris Match

Christian Brincourt (27 July 1935 – 1 September 2025) was a French journalist and reporter.

== Life and work ==
Brincourt was born in Neuilly-sur-Seine on 27 July 1935, to Pierre Brincourt and Yvonne Smeesters. He worked at RTL and then at TF1 and collaborated with Paris Match. He covered several major conflicts in the 1960s and 1970s (Algeria, Vietnam, the Six-Day War, etc.) and produced adventure reports, including a crossing of the South Pacific with Éric Tabarly and Himalayan expeditions.

Brincourt died on 1 September 2025, at the age of 90.
