= Egg lecithin =

Type of lecithin derived from eggs

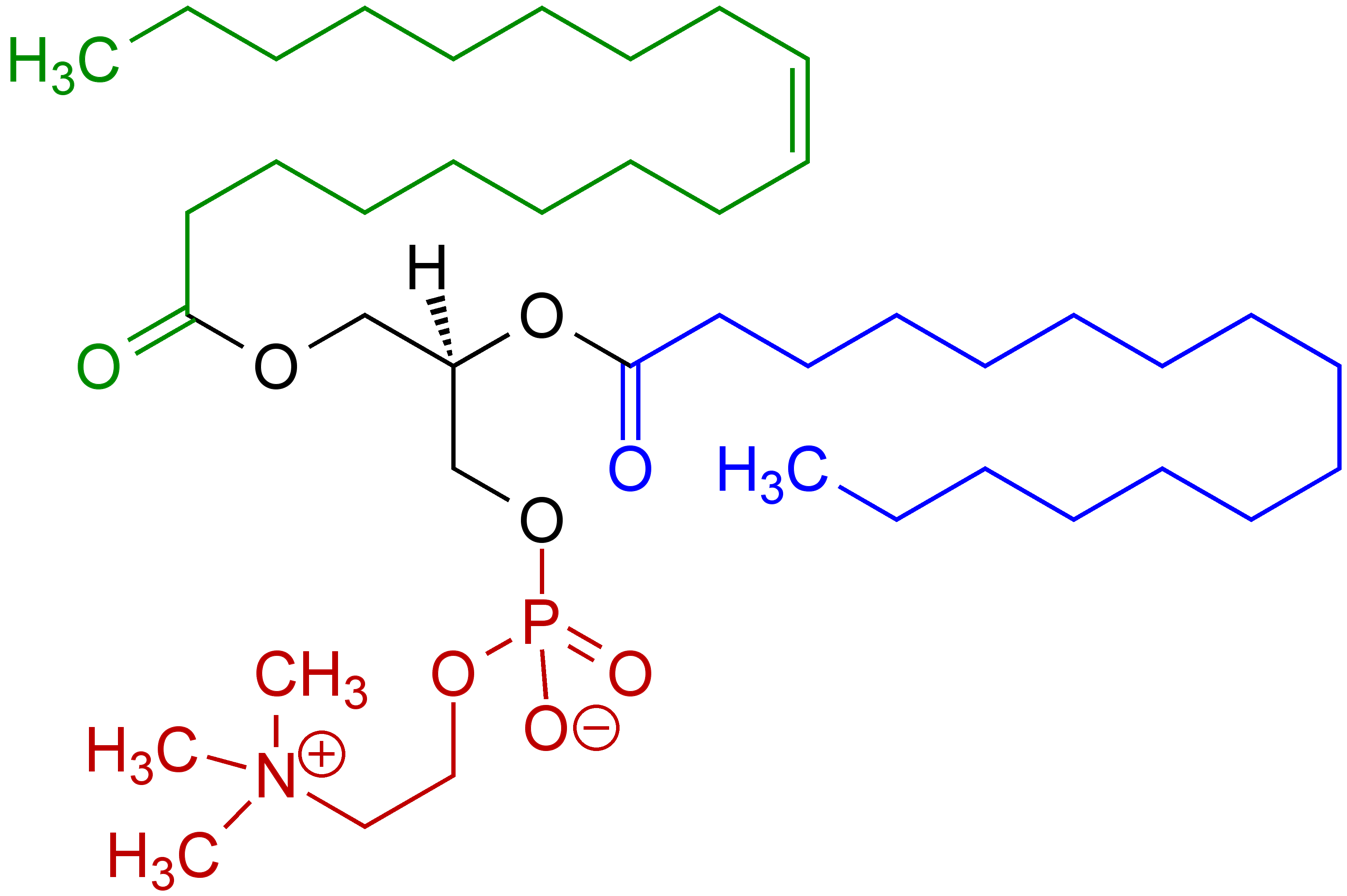
An example of a phosphatidylcholine, a type of phospholipid in egg lecithin. Red - choline and phosphate group; Black - glycerol; Green - unsaturated fatty acid; Blue - saturated fatty acid

Egg lecithin is a type of lecithin, a group of compounds primarily containing phospholipids, that is derived from eggs.

== Discovery ==
Egg lecithin was first isolated in 1846 by the French chemist and pharmacist Theodore Gobley. Gobley originally isolated lecithin from egg yolk—λέκιθος (lekithos) is 'egg yolk' in ancient Greek—and established the complete chemical formula of phosphatidylcholine in 1874.

== Biology ==
Phosphatidylcholine a major component of egg lecithin, occurs in all cellular organisms, being one of the important components of the phospholipid portion of the cell membrane. Other components include phosphatidylethanolamine and sphingomyelin.

== Production ==
Egg lecithin is usually extracted chemically using ethanol, acetone, petroleum ether but not benzene or hexane due to restrictions on residual solvents by the pharmaceutical regulations. It is an emulsifier, especially for parenteral use since it does not need to be metabolized. In aqueous solution, its phospholipids can form either liposomes, bilayer sheets, micelles, or lamellar structures, depending on hydration and temperature. This results in a type of surfactant that is usually classified as amphipathic.

Commercial egg lecithin, specified in the United States National Formulatory (USP/NF) as used by pharmaceutical companies, is a highly purified mixture of phospholipids, devoid of triglycerides, cholesterol, or proteins.

== Properties and applications ==
Egg lecithin has emulsification and lubricant properties, and is a surfactant. It can be totally integrated into the cell membrane in humans, so does not need to be metabolized and is well tolerated by humans and nontoxic when ingested; some synthetic emulsifiers can only be excreted via the kidneys.

Applications include:

- In the pharmaceutical industry, it acts as a wetting, stabilizing agent and a choline enrichment carrier, helps in emulsifications and encapsulation, and is a good dispersing agent. It can be used in manufacture of intravenous fat infusions and for therapeutic use. Examples of intravenous applications are propofol for anesthesia, NSAID drugs, etc.
- In the cosmetics industry, it is used to produce stable O/W emulsions for cosmetic compositions or pharmaceutical excipients

Egg lecithin is approved by the United States Food and Drug Administration with the status "generally recognized as safe" and listed in the compendium.

=== Compatibility with special diets ===
Egg-derived lecithin is not usually a concern for those allergic to eggs since commercially available food grade egg lecithin is devoid of allergy-causing egg proteins. Egg lecithin is not a concern for those on low-cholesterol diets, because the lecithin found in eggs markedly inhibits the absorption of the cholesterol contained in eggs.
