= Fospropofol =

Chemical compound

- Chemical structure of fospropofol disodium

Clinical data
- AHFS/Drugs.com: Monograph
- License data: US FDA: Fospropofol
- Pregnancy category: B
- Dependence liability: unknown
- Routes of administration: Intravenous
- ATC code: N01

Legal status
- Legal status: US: Schedule IV

Pharmacokinetic data
- Protein binding: 98%
- Metabolism: Hepatic glucuronidation
- Elimination half-life: 0.81 hours
- Excretion: Renal

Identifiers
- IUPAC name: disodium [2,6-di(propan-2-yl)phenoxy]methyl phosphate
- CAS Number: 258516-89-1; Disodium salt: 258516-87-9
- PubChem CID: 3038498; Disodium salt: 3038497
- DrugBank: DB06716; Disodium salt: DBSALT000090
- ChemSpider: 2302062; Disodium salt: 2302061
- UNII: LZ257RZP7K; Disodium salt: 30868AY0IF
- KEGG: Disodium salt: D04257
- ChEMBL: ChEMBL1201766
- CompTox Dashboard (EPA): DTXSID50870295

Chemical and physical data
- Formula: C_{13}H_{21}O_{5}P
- Molar mass: 288.280 g·mol^{−1}
- 3D model (JSmol): Interactive image
- SMILES: CC(C)c1cccc(c1OCOP(=O)(O)O)C(C)C
- InChI: InChI=1S/C13H21O5P/c1-9(2)11-6-5-7-12(10(3)4)13(11)17-8-18-19(14,15)16/h5-7,9-10H,8H2,1-4H3,(H2,14,15,16); Key:QVNNONOFASOXQV-UHFFFAOYSA-N

Fospropofol (INN), often used as the disodium salt (trade name Lusedra), is an intravenous sedative-hypnotic agent. It is currently approved for use in sedation of adult patients undergoing diagnostic or therapeutic procedures such as endoscopy.

== Clinical applications ==
Several water-soluble derivatives and prodrugs of the widely used intravenous anesthetic agent propofol have been developed, of which fospropofol has been found to be the most suitable for clinical development thus far. Purported advantages of this water-soluble chemical compound include less pain at the site of intravenous administration, less potential for hyperlipidemia with long-term administration, and less chance for bacteremia. Often, fospropofol is administered in conjunction with an opioid such as fentanyl.

== Clinical pharmacology ==
=== Mechanism of action ===
Fospropofol is a prodrug of propofol; as an organophosphate it is metabolized by alkaline phosphatases to phosphate and formaldehyde and the active metabolite, propofol.

=== Pharmacokinetics ===
Initial trial results on fospropofol pharmacokinetics were retracted by the investigators. As of 2011, new results were not available.

==== Distribution ====
Following the administration of fospropofol 12.5 mg/kg (the maximum recommended dose) loss of consciousness takes about four minutes, compared to one arm-brain circulation time with propofol 2.5 mg/kg (the maximum recommended dose).

==== Metabolism ====
Fospropofol is metabolized in the liver by alkaline phosphatases to propofol, formaldehyde, and phosphate. The hepatic metabolism of this prodrug to an active metabolite means that peak plasma levels of propofol after the administration of a bolus of fospropofol are lower than for an equipotent dose of propofol and also that its clinical effect is more sustained. These features can be desirable for endoscopic procedures such as esophagogastroduodenoscopy, colonoscopy, bronchoscopy, as well as for some surgical procedures done under local or regional anesthesia.

Propofol is further metabolised to propofol glucuronide (34.8%) and quinol glucuronide. Formaldehyde is a known carcinogen but label information states that serum formaldehyde levels are similar to background levels. No long term studies have been done on the cancer risks. The parent drug has a terminal elimination half-life of 0.88+/-0.08 hours, which is non-renal.

== Controlled substance ==
Fospropofol is classified as a Schedule IV controlled substance in the United States' Controlled Substances Act.

== See also ==
- Ciprofol
- Propofol hemisuccinate
