= Jean-Pierre Winter =

French psychoanalyst (1951–2025)

Jean-Pierre Winter (28 April 1951 – 9 December 2025) was a French psychoanalyst and writer.

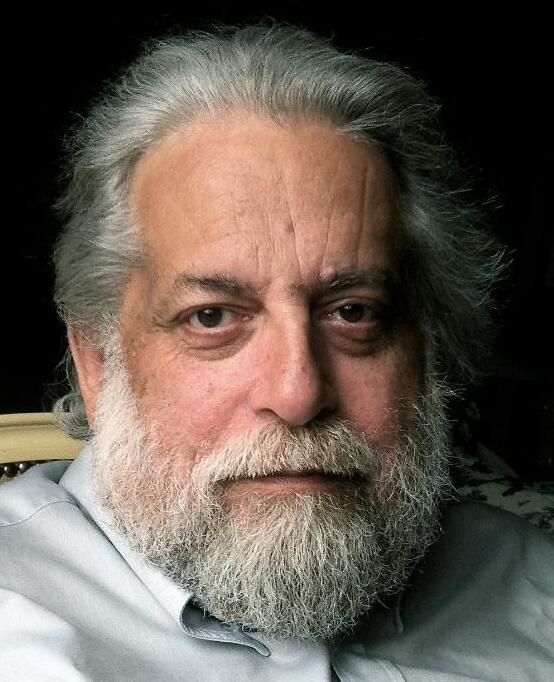
Jean-Pierre Winter

== Life and career ==
Winter was born in Paris on 28 April 1951, to exiled Hungarian and Jewish parents, his father was originally from Transylvania, and later emigrated to Budapest.

He was a co-founder of the "Freudian Cost Movement". He taught child psychopathology at the University of Louvain-la-Neuve and the College of Jewish Studies of the Alliance Israélite Universelle (AIU). In 2019, he became a member of the Independent Commission on Sexual Abuse in the Church (CIASE).

In 2023, he was made a Knight of the Legion of Honor.

Winter died on 9 December 2025, at the age of 74.
