= Xavier Emmanuelli =

French doctor and politician (1938–2025)

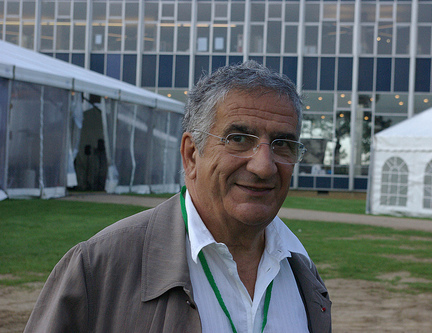
Emmanuelli in 2007

Xavier Emmanuelli (23 August 1938 – 16 November 2025) was a French doctor and politician. He was the co-founder of Médecins Sans Frontières.

== Life and career ==
Xavier Emmanuelli was born to Corsican parents. His father, a schoolteacher and later a doctor, was from Zalana, and his mother, also a schoolteacher, was from Propriano. Members of the Resistance during World War II, they hid Jewish children and were recognized as "Righteous Among the Nations." He has two sisters, Anne Marie Emmanuelli-Orecchioni, a university professor (faculty of pharmacy), and Claire Emmanuelli-Zara, a gynecologist, and a brother, Jean-Marc Emmanuelli, a gynecologist and surgeon, president of the Association of Corsican Doctors, founded by their father after World War II with island doctors exiled in Paris.

During his student years, he hesitated between philosophy and medicine. A communist activist, he was a university friend of Bernard Kouchner, with whom he participated in the anti-fascist security service, then in an expedition to Jordan in September 1970. This anti-colonialist was an occasional cartoonist for Hara-Kiri. Along with Rony Brauman, he was one of the many members of the Cochin group of friends who had a "strong propensity" to "experience activism as an opportunity to go" primarily "beat up fascists", against whom he "frequently got into fistfights."

Emmanuelli ultimately opted for medicine, graduating in 1967 and then specializing in neurology and then in anesthesiology and intensive care in 1976. He was a general practitioner for the coal mining company at the Freyming-Merlebach Mining Hospital from 1972 to 1975, then a doctor in the merchant navy for two years. Meanwhile, he joined the leadership of Doctors Without Borders, where he reconnected with Rony Brauman, whom he had known during his activist years as a student at Cochin Hospital. He twice refused Brauman's requests for missions when he applied, in 1976 and 1978. He then trained in emergency medicine and joined the SAMU (Emergency Medical Service) under the direction of his mentor, Professor Pierre Huguenard, one of the founders of the SAMU. He has three children who also studied medicine.

In 1993, Emmanuelli co-founded the SAMU Social (Emergency Medical Service) of the city of Paris with Dominique Versini. Since 1997, he has returned to practicing medicine and was head of the national network "Psychological Suffering and Precariousness," created in April 1998.

Between 1995 and 1997, Emmanuelli served as Secretary of State for Emergency Humanitarian Action in the first and second governments of Alain Juppé.

Emmanuelli died in Paris on 16 November 2025, at the age of 87, after a "probable cardiac" collapse, according to the announcement by Samu social.
