= Propofol =

Intravenous medication used in anesthesia

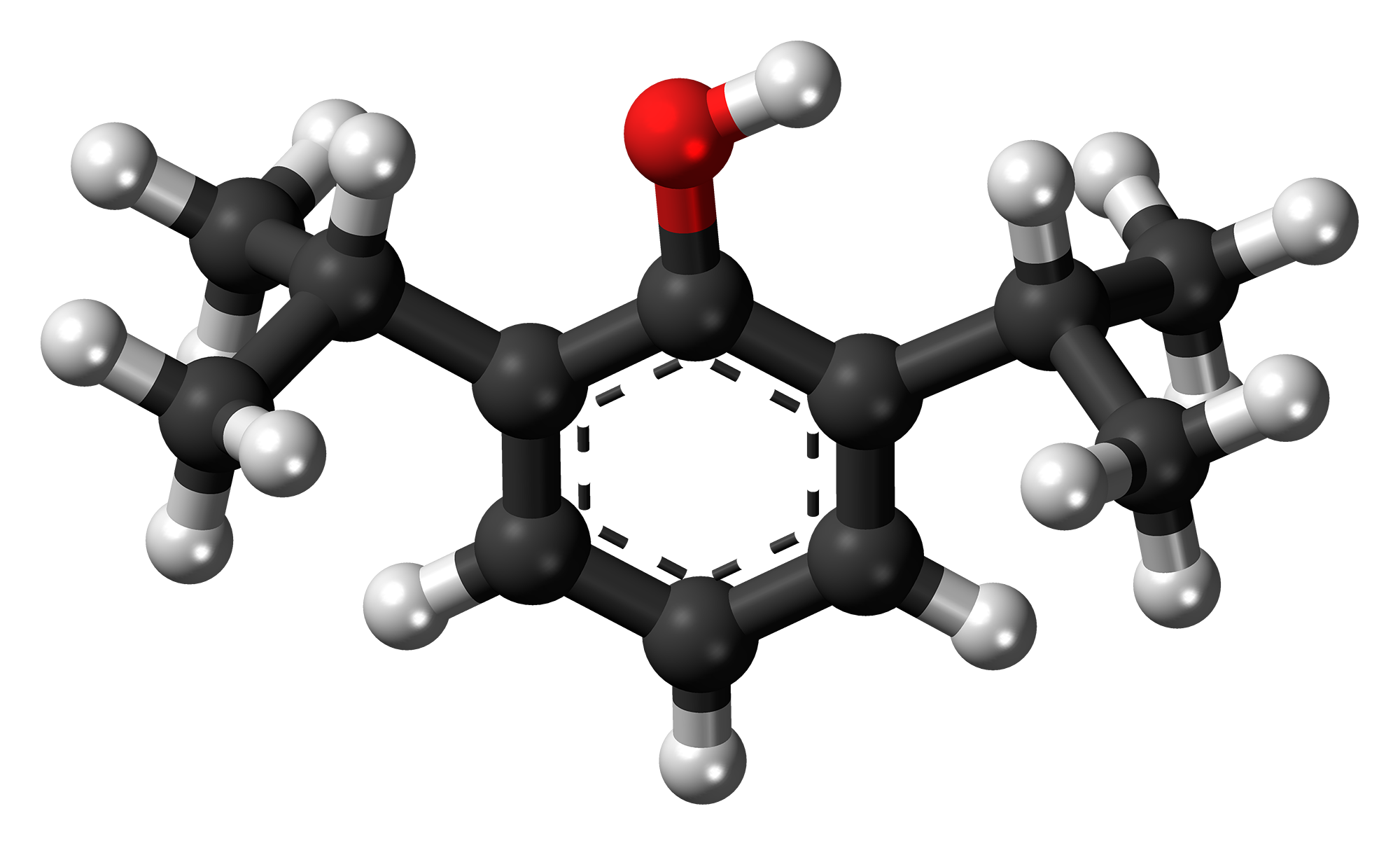

Clinical data
- Trade names: Diprivan, others
- Other names: 2,6-Diisopropylphenol
- AHFS/Drugs.com: Monograph
- License data: US DailyMed: Propofol
- Pregnancy category: AU: C
- Dependence liability: Physical: Very high Psychological: no data
- Addiction liability: Moderate
- Routes of administration: Intravenous
- Drug class: GABA_{A} receptor agonist; sedative; general anesthetic
- ATC code: N01AX10 (WHO)

Legal status
- Legal status: AU: S4 (Prescription only); BR: Class C1 (Other controlled substances); CA: ℞-only; UK: POM (Prescription only); US: ℞-only; SE: Rx-only; In general: ℞ (Prescription only)

Pharmacokinetic data
- Protein binding: 95–99%
- Metabolism: Liver glucuronidation
- Onset of action: Intravenous: 15–30 seconds
- Elimination half-life: 1.5–31 hours
- Duration of action: ~5–10 minutes
- Excretion: Liver

Identifiers
- IUPAC name: 2,6-di(propan-2-yl)phenol
- CAS Number: 2078-54-8
- PubChem CID: 4943
- IUPHAR/BPS: 5464
- DrugBank: DB00818
- ChemSpider: 4774
- UNII: YI7VU623SF
- KEGG: D00549
- ChEBI: CHEBI:44915
- ChEMBL: ChEMBL526
- CompTox Dashboard (EPA): DTXSID6023523
- ECHA InfoCard: 100.016.551

Chemical and physical data
- Formula: C_{12}H_{18}O
- Molar mass: 178.275 g·mol^{−1}
- 3D model (JSmol): Interactive image
- Density: 0.955 g/cm^{3} (20 °C)
- Melting point: 18 °C (64 °F)
- Boiling point: 256 °C (493 °F)
- Solubility in water: ΔG_{solv}^{H_{2}O} = -4.39kcal/mol
- SMILES: CC(C)c1cccc(c1O)C(C)C
- InChI: InChI=1S/C12H18O/c1-8(2)10-6-5-7-11(9(3)4)12(10)13/h5-9,13H,1-4H3; Key:OLBCVFGFOZPWHH-UHFFFAOYSA-N

Propofol is the active component of an intravenous anesthetic used for induction and maintenance of general anesthesia. Propofol was first marketed under the brand name Diprivan. Intravenous administration is used to induce unconsciousness, after which anesthesia may be maintained using a combination of medications. Propofol is manufactured as part of a sterile injectable emulsion using soybean oil and lecithin, which gives it a white milky color.

Compared to other anesthetics, recovery from propofol-induced anesthesia is generally quick and infrequently associated with such side effects as drowsiness, nausea, vomiting. Propofol may be used before diagnostic procedures requiring anesthesia, in the management of refractory status epilepticus, and for induction or maintenance of anesthesia before and during surgery. It may be administered as a bolus or an infusion, or as a combination of the two.

First synthesized in 1973 by John B. Glen, a British veterinary anesthesiologist working for Imperial Chemical Industries (ICI, later AstraZeneca), propofol was introduced for therapeutic use as a lipid emulsion in the United Kingdom and New Zealand in 1986. Propofol (Diprivan) received FDA approval in October 1989. It is on the World Health Organization's List of Essential Medicines.

== Uses ==
=== Anesthesia ===
To induce general anesthesia, propofol is the drug used almost exclusively, having largely replaced sodium thiopental.

It is often administered as part of an anesthesia maintenance technique called total intravenous anesthesia, using either manually programmed infusion pumps or computer-controlled infusion pumps in a process called target controlled infusion (TCI).

Propofol is also used to sedate people who are receiving mechanical ventilation but not undergoing surgery, such as patients in the intensive care unit. In critically ill patients, propofol is superior to lorazepam both in effectiveness and overall cost. Propofol is relatively inexpensive compared to medications of similar use due to shorter ICU stay length. One of the reasons propofol is thought to be more effective (although it has a longer half-life than lorazepam) is that studies have found that benzodiazepines like midazolam and lorazepam tend to accumulate in critically ill patients, prolonging sedation.

Propofol has also been suggested as a sleep aid for critically ill adults in an ICU setting; however, its effectiveness in replicating the mental and physical aspects of sleep for people in the ICU is unclear.

Propofol can be administered via a peripheral IV or central line. Propofol is often paired with fentanyl (for pain relief) in intubated and sedated people. The two drugs are molecularly compatible in an IV mixture form.

Propofol is also used to deepen anesthesia to relieve laryngospasm. It may be used alone or followed by succinylcholine. Its use can avoid the need for paralysis and in some instances the potential side-effects of succinylcholine.

=== Routine procedural sedation ===
Propofol is safe and effective for gastrointestinal endoscopy procedures (colonoscopies, etc.). Its use in these settings results in a faster recovery compared to midazolam. It can also be combined with opioids or benzodiazepines. Because of its rapid induction and recovery time, propofol is also widely used for sedation of infants and children undergoing MRI procedures. It is also often used in combination with ketamine with minimal side effects.

=== Status epilepticus ===
Status epilepticus may be defined as seizure activity lasting beyond five minutes and needing anticonvulsant medication. Several guidelines recommend the use of propofol for the treatment of refractory status epilepticus.

=== Other uses ===
==== Assisted death in Canada ====
A lethal dose of propofol is used for medical assistance in dying in Canada to induce deep coma and death quickly, but rocuronium is always given as a paralytic, ensuring death, even when the patient has died as a result of an initial propofol overdose.

==== Capital punishment ====
The use of propofol as part of an execution protocol has been considered, although no person has been executed using this agent. This is largely due to European manufacturers and governments banning the export of propofol for such use.

==== Recreational use ====
Recreational use of the drug via self-administration has been reported but is relatively rare due to its potency and the level of monitoring required for safe use. Critically, a steep dose-response curve makes recreational use of propofol very dangerous, and deaths from self-administration continue to be reported. The short-term effects sought via recreational use include mild euphoria, hallucinations, and disinhibition.

Recreational use of the drug has been described among medical staff, such as anesthetists who have access to the drug. It is reportedly more common among anesthetists on rotations with short rest periods, as usage generally produces a well-rested feeling. Long-term use has been reported to result in addiction.

Attention to the risks of off-label use of propofol increased in August 2009, after the release of a coroner's report finding that musician Michael Jackson was killed by a mixture of propofol and the benzodiazepine drugs lorazepam, midazolam, and diazepam on 25 June 2009. According to a 22 July 2009 search warrant affidavit unsealed by the district court of Harris County, Texas, Jackson's physician, Conrad Murray, administered 25 milligrams of propofol diluted with lidocaine shortly before Jackson's death.

== Manufacturing ==
Propofol, as a commercial sterile emulsified formulation, is considered difficult to manufacture.

It was initially formulated in Cremophor for human use, but this original formulation was implicated in an unacceptable number of anaphylactic events. It was eventually manufactured as a 1% emulsion in soybean oil. Sterile emulsions represent complex formulation, the stability of which is dependent on the interplay of many factors such as micelle size and distribution.

== Side effects ==
There is considerable variability in a patient's response to propofol, at times showing profound sedation with small doses.

One of propofol's most common side effects is pain on injection, especially in smaller veins, due to activation of the sensory nerve pain receptor, TRPA1,. This can be mitigated by pretreatment with lidocaine or slower infusion in a large vein (antecubital fossa).

Propofol may lead to low blood pressure related to vasodilation. Reports of blood pressure drops of 30% or more are thought to be at least partially due to inhibition of sympathetic nerve activity. This effect is related to the dose and rate of propofol administration. It may also be potentiated by opioid analgesics.

Transient apnea and cerebrovascular effects have followed induction doses. Propofol has more pronounced hemodynamic effects relative to many intravenous anesthetic agents. Propofol can also decrease systemic vascular resistance, myocardial blood flow, and oxygen consumption, possibly through direct vasodilation. There are also reports that it may cause green discoloration of the urine.

Although propofol is widely used in the adult ICU setting, the side effects associated with the medication seem to be more concerning in children. In the 1990s, multiple reported deaths of children in ICUs associated with propofol sedation prompted the FDA to issue a warning.

As a respiratory depressant, propofol frequently produces apnea. The persistence of apnea can depend on factors such as premedication, dose administered, and rate of administration, and may sometimes persist for longer than 60 seconds. Possibly as the result of depression of the central inspiratory drive, propofol may produce significant decreases in respiratory rate, minute volume, tidal volume, mean inspiratory flow rate, and functional residual capacity.

Propofol administration also results in decreased cerebral blood flow, cerebral metabolic oxygen consumption, and intracranial pressure. In addition, propofol may decrease intraocular pressure by as much as 50% in patients with normal intraocular pressure.

A more serious but rare side effect is dystonia. Mild myoclonic movements are common, as with other intravenous hypnotic agents. Propofol appears to be safe for use in porphyria, and has not been known to trigger malignant hyperthermia.

Propofol is also reported to induce priapism in some individuals, and has been observed to suppress REM sleep and to worsen the poor sleep quality in some patients.

Rare side effects include:

- anxiety
- changes in vision
- cloudy urine
- coughing up blood
- delirium or hallucinations
- difficult urination
- difficulty swallowing
- dry eyes, mouth, nose, or throat

As with any other general anesthetic agent, propofol should be administered only where appropriately trained staff and facilities for monitoring are available, with proper airway management, a supply of supplemental oxygen, artificial ventilation, and cardiovascular resuscitation.

Because of propofol's formulation (using lecithin and soybean oil), it is prone to bacterial contamination, despite the presence of the bacterial inhibitor benzyl alcohol; consequently, some hospital facilities require the IV tubing (for continuous propofol infusions) to be changed after 12 hours. This is a preventive measure against microbial growth and potential infection.

=== Propofol infusion syndrome ===
A rare, but serious, side effect is propofol infusion syndrome. This potentially lethal metabolic derangement has been reported in critically ill patients after a prolonged infusion of high-dose propofol, sometimes in combination with catecholamines and/or corticosteroids.

== Interactions ==
The respiratory effects of propofol are increased if given with other respiratory depressants, including benzodiazepines.

== Pharmacology ==
=== Pharmacodynamics ===
Propofol's proposed mechanism of actionsuggests potentiation of GABA_{A} receptor activity by acting as a GABA_{A} receptor positive allosteric modulator, which slows receptor channel-closing time. At high doses, propofol may activate GABA_{A} receptors in the absence of GABA, behaving as a GABA_{A} receptor agonist as well. Propofol analogs also seem to act as sodium channel blockers.

Some research suggested significant endocannabinoid system contributions to propofol's unique anesthetic properties, as endocannabinoids also play an important role in the physiologic control of sleep, pain processing and emesis. An EEG study on patients undergoing general anesthesia with propofol found that it causes a prominent reduction in the brain's information integration capacity. A 2026 study using Neuropixels detected hippocampus activity distinguishing sounds and recognizing language under general anesthesia with propofol.

Propofol inhibits fatty acid amide hydrolase, which metabolizes the endocannabinoid anandamide (AEA). Activation of the endocannabinoid system by propofol, possibly via inhibition of AEA catabolism, generates a significant increase in the whole-brain content of AEA, contributing to the sedative properties of propofol via CB1 receptor activation. This may explain the psychotomimetic and antiemetic properties of propofol. By contrast, there is a high incidence of postoperative nausea and vomiting after administration of volatile anesthetics, which contribute to a significant decrease in the whole-brain content of AEA that can last up to forty minutes after induction.

=== Pharmacokinetics ===
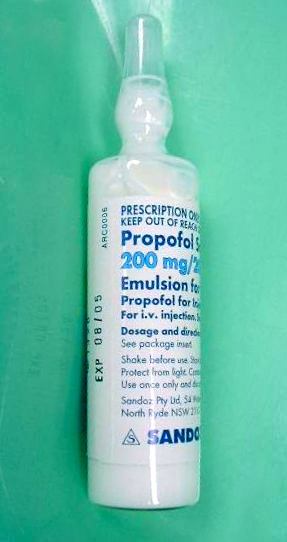
A 20 ml ampoule of 1% propofol emulsion, as sold in Australia by Sandoz

Propofol is highly protein-bound in vivo and is metabolized by conjugation in the liver. The half-life of elimination of propofol has been estimated to be between 2 and 24 hours. However, its duration of clinical effect is much shorter because propofol is rapidly distributed into peripheral tissues. When used for IV sedation, a single dose of propofol typically wears off within minutes. Onset is rapid, in as little as 15–30 seconds. Propofol's versatility allows it to be used for short or prolonged sedation, and general anesthesia; and unlike opioid medications, its use is not associated with nausea. These characteristics of rapid onset and recovery along with its amnestic effects have led to its widespread use for sedation and anesthesia.

== History ==
John B. Glen, a veterinarian and researcher at Imperial Chemical Industries (ICI), spent thirteen years developing propofol, an effort for which he was awarded the 2018 Lasker Award for clinical research.

Originally developed as ICI 35868, propofol was chosen after extensive evaluation and structure–activity relationship studies of the anesthetic potencies and pharmacokinetic profiles of a series of ortho-alkylated phenols.

First identified as a drug candidate in 1973, propofol entered clinical trials in 1977, using a form solubilized in cremophor EL. However, due to anaphylactic reactions to cremophor, this formulation was withdrawn from the market and subsequently reformulated as an emulsion of a soya oil and propofol mixture in water. The emulsified formulation was relaunched in 1986 by ICI (whose pharmaceutical division later became a constituent of AstraZeneca) under the brand name Diprivan. The preparation contains 1% propofol, 10% soybean oil, and 1.2% purified egg phospholipid as an emulsifier, with 2.25% glycerol as a tonicity-adjusting agent, and sodium hydroxide to adjust the pH. Diprivan contains EDTA, a common chelation agent that also acts alone (bacteriostatically against some bacteria) and synergistically with some other antimicrobial agents. Newer generic formulations contain sodium metabisulfite as an antioxidant and benzyl alcohol as an antimicrobial agent. Propofol emulsion is an opaque white fluid due to the scattering of light from the emulsified micelle formulation.

== Developments ==
A water-soluble prodrug, fospropofol, has been developed and tested with positive results. Fospropofol is rapidly broken down by the enzyme alkaline phosphatase to form propofol. Marketed as Lusedra, this formulation may not produce the pain at the injection site that often occurs with the conventional form of the drug. The U.S. Food and Drug Administration (FDA) approved the product in 2008.

By incorporation of an azobenzene unit, a photoswitchable version of propofol (AP2) was developed in 2012 that allows for optical control of GABA_{A} receptors with light. In 2013, a propofol binding site on mammalian GABA_{A} receptors has been identified by photolabeling using a diazirine derivative. Additionally, it was shown that the hyaluronan polymer present in the synovia can be protected from free-radical depolymerization by propofol.

Ciprofol is another derivative of propofol that is 4–6 times more potent than propofol. As of 2022 it is undergoing Phase III trials. Ciprofol appears to have a lower incidence of injection site pain and respiratory depression than propofol.

Propofol has also been studied for treatment resistant depression.

== Veterinary uses ==
In November 2024, the US Food and Drug Administration approved PropofolVet Multidose, the first generic propofol injectable emulsion for dogs. PropofolVet Multidose is approved for use as an injectable anesthetic in dogs.

PropofolVet Multidose contains the same active ingredient (propofol injectable emulsion) as the approved brand-name drug product, PropoFlo 28, which was first approved on 4 February 2011. In addition, the FDA determined that PropofolVet Multidose contains no inactive ingredients that may significantly affect the bioavailability of the active ingredient.
