= Cipepofol =

Intravenous medication used in general anaesthesia

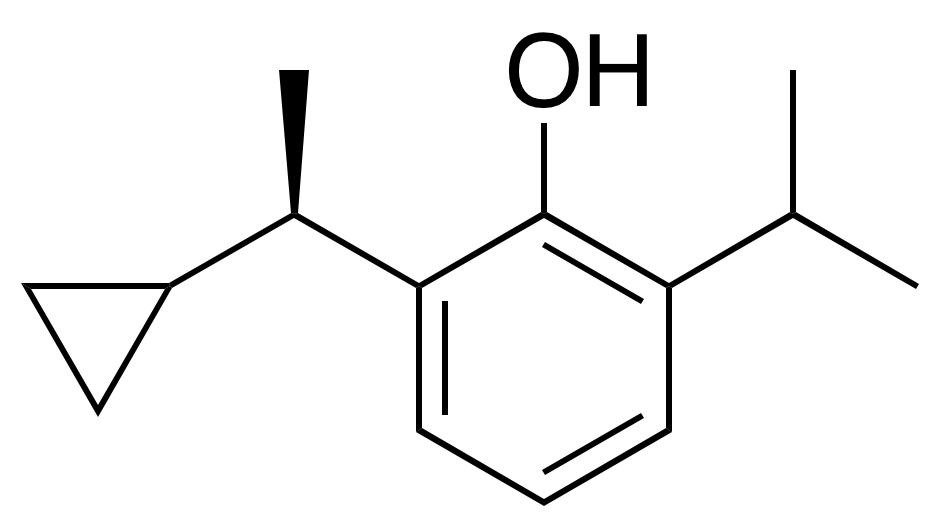

Clinical data
- Trade names: Cypsedo
- Other names: Ciprofol; CS-0064163; CS0064163; GTPL10812; GTPL-10812; HSK-3486; HSK3486; HY-116152; HY116152; (R)-2-(1-Cyclopropylethyl)-6-isopropylphenol
- AHFS/Drugs.com: cypsedo
- License data: US DailyMed: Cipepofol
- Routes of administration: Intravenous infusion
- Drug class: GABA_{A} receptor positive allosteric modulator
- ATC code: None

Legal status
- Legal status: US: ℞-only

Pharmacokinetic data
- Metabolism: Liver glucuronidation
- Excretion: Kidney

Identifiers
- IUPAC name: 2-[(1R)-1-cyclopropylethyl]-6-propan-2-ylphenol
- CAS Number: 1637741-58-2
- PubChem CID: 86301664
- DrugBank: DB16295
- ChemSpider: 76794458
- UNII: M3WGS532VY
- KEGG: D12449
- ChEMBL: ChEMBL4094894

Chemical and physical data
- Formula: C_{14}H_{20}O
- Molar mass: 204.313 g·mol^{−1}
- 3D model (JSmol): Interactive image
- SMILES: C[C@H](C1CC1)C2=CC=CC(=C2O)C(C)C
- InChI: InChI=1S/C14H20O/c1-9(2)12-5-4-6-13(14(12)15)10(3)11-7-8-11/h4-6,9-11,15H,7-8H2,1-3H3/t10-/m1/s1; Key:BMEARIQHWSVDBS-SNVBAGLBSA-N

Cipepofol (INN, USAN), also known as ciprofol or by its developmental code name HSK3486, sold under the brand name Cypsedo, is a general anesthetic related to propofol which is used for anesthesia and sedation. The drug is used by intravenous infusion. A short-acting and highly selective GABA_{A} positive allosteric modulator, ciprofol is 4 to 6 times more potent than other phenol derivatives such as propofol or fospropofol.

In May 2026, cipepofol was approved for medical use in the United States. Manufactured by Haisco Pharmaceutical Group, ciprofol underwent phase I and II trials in Australia and China.

== Physical properties ==
Ciprofol is an optically active 2,6-disubstituted alkylphenol with a cyclopropylethyl group incorporated at the second carbon atom. This cyclopropyl group increases the steric effects and introduces stereoselective effects over its anesthetic properties. These properties appear to increase the anesthetic potency of ciprofol, when compared with propofol.

== Medical uses ==
Ciprofol is used for the intravenous induction of general anesthesia. Studies published in 2022 and 2023 found it was efficacious as a general anesthetic in people undergoing gynecological surgery and kidney transplantation, as well as for endoscopic procedures such as bronchoscopy, esophagogastroduodenoscopy and colonoscopy.

Ciprofol has also been used for sedation of critically ill people undergoing mechanical ventilation in the intensive care unit, as well as for the treatment of agitation and delirium in that patient population. When combined with mild therapeutic hypothermia, ciprofol may also be useful as a cerebral protective agent in the setting of cerebral ischemia-reperfusion injury.

== Side effects ==
When compared with propofol, side effects such as pain on injection and respiratory depression appear to be less common with ciprofol.

== Pharmacology ==
=== Pharmacokinetics ===
Metabolism of ciprofol occurs primarily in the liver through oxidation, glucuronidation, and sulfation, resulting in the formation of the inactive metabolite M4-glucuronide, which is excreted renally. It is not necessary to adjust the dose in people with mild or moderate renal impairment, or in those with mild or moderate hepatic impairment. In elderly people, a slightly lower dose (0.3 mg/kg) appears to be similar in efficacy to the higher doses administered to younger people but is associated with fewer adverse effects.

Ciprofol has a short elimination half-life, generally between 2 and 4 hours. Owing to its rapid metabolism and high clearance, the drug does not tend to accumulate in the body, even during prolonged infusions.

=== Pharmacodynamics ===
Compared to propofol, ciprofol exhibits stronger binding to the GABA_{A} receptor and elicits a greater enhancement of GABA_{A} receptor-mediated neurotransmission. It also acts as a SIRT1 activator.

Ciprofol exhibits pharmacodynamic properties similar to those of propofol, including both rapid onset and rapid offset. Ciprofol appears to have similar effects upon the respiratory and cardiovascular systems as those propofol.

== Biodegradation and toxicity ==
Ciprofol is characterized by a rapid onset of action, and predictable absorption, distribution, metabolism, excretion processes. The compound undergoes glucuronidation in the liver, followed by excretion by the kidneys.
