= General anaesthesia =

Medically induced loss of consciousness

- An endangered species of cougar that has been anesthetized so it can be collared and have a blood sample taken
- Specialty: Anaesthetics
- Uses: Restraint for medical or veterinary purposes or to resolve human-animal conflicts
- Complications: Anaesthesia awareness, overdose, death
- MeSH: D000768
- MedlinePlus: 007410

General anaesthesia (UK) or general anesthesia (US) is drug-induced loss of consciousness that renders a subject unarousable even by painful stimuli. It is achieved through medications, which can be injected or inhaled, often with an analgesic and neuromuscular blocking agent.

General anaesthesia is usually delivered by a dart gun or blowpipe by wildlife conservationists to subdue animals for research, treatment, or relocation, by zookeepers to subdue animals when they escape or when a human needs be retrieved from their enclosure, or by animal control officers to subdue stray, feral, or injured dogs as well as large wildlife that has entered into human territory. It may also be given directly to a subject in a medical or veterinary hospital to subdue it for treatment. Depending on why the subject needs to be subdued, general anaesthesia may or may not be required, and other methods of restraint can be used. Surgeries almost always use general anesthesia because no matter whether the subject is aggressive or not, certain pain stimuli can lead to involuntary responses from the subject, such as movement or muscle contractions, that make the operation extremely difficult. Thus, for many surgical procedures, general anaesthesia is necessary from a practical point of view.

The subject's natural breathing may be inadequate during the procedure and intervention is often necessary to protect the airway.

Various drugs are used to achieve unconsciousness, amnesia, analgesia, loss of reflexes of the autonomic nervous system, and in some cases paralysis of skeletal muscles. The best combination of anaesthetics for a given subject and procedure is chosen by a medical or veterinary professional, and, if the subject is an adult human, in consultation with the subject and the surgeon or practitioner performing the procedure.

The administration of general anesthesia to a human patient without consent is called chemical restraint.

== History ==
Attempts at producing general anaesthesia can be traced throughout recorded history in the writings of the ancient Sumerians, Babylonians, Assyrians, Egyptians, Greeks, Romans, Indians, and Chinese. During the Middle Ages, scholars made advances in the Eastern world and Europe.

The Renaissance saw advances in anatomy and surgical technique. However, surgery remained a treatment of last resort. Largely because of the associated pain, many patients chose certain death over surgery. Although there has been debate as to who deserves the most credit for the discovery of general anaesthesia, scientific discoveries in the late 18th and early 19th centuries were critical to the eventual introduction and development of modern anaesthetic techniques.

Two enormous leaps occurred in the late 19th century, which allowed the transition to modern surgery. An appreciation of the germ theory of disease led to the development of antiseptic techniques in surgery. Antisepsis, which soon gave way to asepsis, reduced the overall morbidity and mortality of surgery to a far more acceptable rate. Concurrently, significant advances in pharmacology and physiology led to the development of general anaesthesia. On 14 November 1804, Hanaoka Seishū, a Japanese surgeon, became the first person on record to perform successful surgery using general anaesthesia.

In the 20th century, general anaesthesia's safety and efficacy improved with routine tracheal intubation and other advanced airway management techniques. Advances in monitoring and new anaesthetic agents with improved pharmacokinetic and pharmacodynamic characteristics also contributed to this trend, and standardized training programs for anaesthesiologists and nurse anaesthetists emerged.

In 1953, the dart gun was invented, making it possible to administer general anaesthesia from a distance.

== Purpose ==
General anaesthesia has many purposes and is routinely used in many medical and veterinary procedures. An appropriate surgical anaesthesia should include the following goals:

1. Hypnosis/Unconsciousness (loss of awareness)
2. Analgesia (loss of response to pain)
3. Amnesia (loss of memory)
4. Immobility (loss of motor reflexes)
5. Paralysis (skeletal muscle relaxation and normal muscle relaxation)

Instead of receiving continuous deep sedation, such as via benzodiazepines, dying patients may choose to be completely unconscious as they die.

== Biochemical mechanism of action ==
The biochemical mechanism of action of general anaesthetics is not fully understood. Anaesthetics have myriad sites of action and affect the central nervous system (CNS) at several levels. General anaesthesia interrupts or changes the functions of CNS components including the cerebral cortex, thalamus, reticular activating system, and spinal cord. Theories of anaesthesia identify target sites in the CNS, neural networks and arousal circuits linked with unconsciousness, and some anaesthetics can potentially activate specific sleep-active regions.

Two non-exclusionary mechanisms include membrane-mediated and direct protein-mediated anesthesia. Potential protein-mediated molecular targets are GABA_{A}, and NMDA glutamate receptors. General anaesthesia was thought to enhance the inhibitory transmission or to reduce the excitatory transmission of neuro signalling. Most volatile anaesthetics have been found to be a GABA_{A} agonist, although the site of action on the receptor remains unknown. Ketamine is a non-competitive NMDA receptor antagonist.

The chemical structure and properties of anaesthetics, as first noted by Meyer and Overton, suggest they could target the plasma membrane. A membrane-mediated mechanism that could account for the activation of an ion channel remained elusive until recently. A study from 2020 showed that inhaled anaesthetics (chloroform and isoflurane) could displace phospholipase D2 from ordered lipid domains in the plasma membrane, which led to the production of the signalling molecule phosphatidic acid (PA). The signalling molecule activated TWIK-related K+ channels (TREK-1), a channel involved in anaesthesia. PLD^{null} fruit flies were shown to resist anaesthesia. The results established a membrane mediated target for inhaled anaesthetics.

== Preoperative evaluation ==
Before a medical or veterinary procedure, an anaesthesiologist or veterinarian reviews assesses the subject, and examines it to determine an appropriate anaesthetic plan and decide what combination of drugs and dosages will be needed for the subject's comfort and safety during the procedure. A variety of non-invasive and invasive monitoring devices may be necessary to ensure a safe and effective procedure. Key factors in this evaluation are the subject's age, species, sex, body mass index, medical and surgical history, current medications, exercise capacity, and fasting time. Thorough and accurate preoperative evaluation is crucial for the effective safety of the anaesthetic plan. For example, a patient who consumes significant quantities of alcohol or illicit drugs could be undermedicated during the procedure if they fail to disclose this fact, and this could lead to anaesthesia awareness or intraoperative hypertension. Commonly used medications can also interact with anaesthetics, and failure to disclose such usage can increase the risk during the operation. Inaccurate timing of last meal can also increase the risk for aspiration of food, and lead to serious complications.

An important aspect of pre-anaesthetic evaluation is an assessment of the subject's airway, involving inspection of the mouth opening and visualisation of the soft tissues of the pharynx. The condition of teeth and location of dental crowns are checked, and neck flexibility and head extension are observed. The most commonly performed airway assessment is the Mallampati score, which evaluates the airway base on the ability to view airway structures with the mouth open and the tongue protruding. Mallampati tests alone have limited accuracy, and other evaluations are routinely performed addition to the Mallampati test including mouth opening, thyromental distance, neck range of motion, and mandibular protrusion. In a subject with suspected distorted airway anatomy, endoscopy or ultrasound is sometimes used to evaluate its airway before planning for the airway management.

== Premedication ==
Prior to administration of a general anaesthetic, the anaesthetist may administer one or more drugs that complement or improve the quality or safety of the anaesthetic or provide anxiolysis. Premedication also often has mild sedative effects and may reduce the amount of anaesthetic agent required during the case.

One commonly used premedication is clonidine, an alpha-2 adrenergic agonist. It reduces postoperative shivering, postoperative nausea and vomiting, and emergence delirium. However, a randomized controlled trial from 2021 demonstrated that clonidine is less effective at providing anxiolysis and more sedative in children of preschool age. Oral clonidine can take up to 45 minutes to take full effect; the drawbacks of clonidine include hypotension and bradycardia, but these can be advantageous in subjects with hypertension and tachycardia. Another commonly used alpha-2 adrenergic agonist is dexmedetomidine, which is commonly used to provide a short term sedative effect (<24 hours). Dexmedetomidine and certain atypical antipsychotic agents may be also used in uncooperative children.

Benzodiazepines are the most commonly used class of drugs for premedication. The most commonly utilized benzodiazepine is Midazolam, which is characterized by a rapid onset and short duration. Midazolam is effective in reducing preoperative anxiety, including separation anxiety in children. It also provides mild sedation, sympathicolysis, and anterograde amnesia.

Melatonin has been found to be effective as an anaesthetic premedication in both adults and children because of its hypnotic, anxiolytic, sedative, analgesic, and anticonvulsant properties. Recovery is more rapid after premedication with melatonin than with midazolam, and there is also a reduced incidence of post-operative agitation and delirium. Melatonin has been shown to have a similar effect in reducing perioperative anxiety in adult human patients compared to benzodiazepine.

Another example of anaesthetic premedication is the preoperative administration of beta adrenergic antagonists, which reduce the burden of arrhythmias after cardiac surgery. However, evidence also has shown an association of increased adverse events with beta-blockers in non-cardiac surgery. Anaesthesiologists may administer one or more antiemetic agents such as ondansetron, droperidol, or dexamethasone to prevent postoperative nausea and vomiting. NSAIDs are commonly used analgesic premedication agent, and often reduce need for opioids such as fentanyl or sufentanil. Also gastrokinetic agents such as metoclopramide, and histamine antagonists such as famotidine.

Non-pharmacologic preanaesthetic interventions include playing cognitive behavioral therapy, music therapy, aromatherapy, hypnosis, massage, pre-operative preparation video, and guided imagery relaxation therapy, etc. These techniques are particularly useful for children and patients with intellectual disabilities. Minimizing sensory stimulation or distraction by video games may help to reduce anxiety prior to or during induction of general anaesthesia. Larger high-quality studies are needed to confirm the most effective non-pharmacological approaches for reducing this type of anxiety. Parental presence during premedication and induction of anaesthesia has not been shown to reduce anxiety in children. It is suggested that parents who wish to attend should not be actively discouraged, and parents who prefer not to be present should not be actively encouraged to attend.

== Anaesthesia and the brain ==
Anaesthesia has little to no effect on brain function, unless there is an existing brain disruption. Barbiturates, or the drugs used to administer anaesthesia, do not affect auditory brain stem response. An example of a brain disruption would be a concussion. It can be risky and lead to further brain injury if anaesthesia is used on a concussed person. Concussions create ionic shifts in the brain that adjust the neuronal transmembrane potential. In order to restore this potential more glucose has to be made to equal the potential that is lost. This can be very dangerous and lead to cell death. This makes the brain very vulnerable in surgery. There are also changes to cerebral blood flow. The injury complicates the oxygen blood flow and supply to the brain.

== Stages of anaesthesia ==
Guedel's classification, described by Arthur Ernest Guedel in 1937, describes four stages of anaesthesia. Despite newer anaesthetic agents and delivery techniques, which have led to more rapid onset of—and recovery from—anaesthesia (in some cases bypassing some of the stages entirely), the principles remain.

Stage 1
Stage 1, also known as induction, is the period between the administration of induction agents and loss of consciousness. During this stage, the subject progresses from analgesia without amnesia to analgesia with amnesia. Subjects can carry on a conversation at this time, and may complain about visual disturbance.
Stage 2
Stage 2, also known as the excitement or delirium stage, is the period following loss of consciousness and marked by excited and delirious activity. During this stage, the subject's respiration and heart rate may become irregular. In addition, there may be uncontrolled movements, vomiting, suspension of breathing, and pupillary dilation. Because the combination of spastic movements, vomiting, and irregular respiration may compromise the subject's airway, rapidly acting drugs are used to minimize time in this stage and reach Stage 3 as fast as possible.

Stage 3
In Stage 3, also known as surgical anaesthesia, the skeletal muscles relax, vomiting stops. Respiratory depression and cessation of eye movements are the hallmarks of this stage. The subject is unconscious and ready for surgery. This stage is divided into four planes:
1. The eyes roll, then become fixed; eyelid and swallow reflexes are lost. Still have regular spontaneous breathing;
2. Corneal and laryngeal reflexes are lost;
3. The pupillary light reflex is lost; and the process is marked by complete relaxation of abdominal and intercostal muscles. Ideal level of anesthesia for most surgeries.
4. Full diaphragm paralysis and irregular shallow abdominal respiration occur.
Stage 4
Stage 4, also known as overdose, occurs when too much anaesthetic medication is given relative to the amount of surgical stimulation and the subject has severe brainstem or medullary depression, resulting in a cessation of respiration and potential cardiovascular collapse. This stage is lethal without cardiovascular and respiratory support.:

There are no EEG correlations between the different anesthesia stages that could be used to predict one from the previous one; however, recent algorithms have been developed to assess subject sensitivity from the induction phase.

== Induction ==
General anaesthesia is usually induced in an operating theatre or in an anaesthetic room next to the theatre. It may also be induced in an endoscopy suite, intensive care unit, radiology or cardiology department, emergency department, ambulance, or even at the site of a disaster where extrication of the subject may be impractical.

Anaesthetics can be administered by inhalation, injection (intravenous, intramuscular, or subcutaneous), oral, or rectal routes. Once they enter the circulatory system, the agents are transported to their biochemical sites of action in the central and autonomic nervous systems. A study in the 2020s across hospitals in the United Kingdom suggested no difference in post-operative survival when using inhaled versus intravenous general anaesthetics.

Most general anaesthetics are intravenous or inhaled. Commonly used intravenous induction agents include propofol, sodium thiopental, etomidate, methohexital, and ketamine. Inhalational anaesthesia may be chosen when intravenous access is difficult to obtain (e.g., children), when difficulty maintaining the airway is anticipated, or when the subject prefers it. Sevoflurane is the most commonly used agent for inhalational induction, because it is less irritating to the tracheobronchial tree than other agents.

As an example sequence of induction drugs:

1. Pre-oxygenation or denitrogenation to fill lungs with 100% oxygen to permit a longer period of apnea during intubation without affecting blood oxygen levels
2. Fentanyl for systemic analgesia during intubation
3. Propofol for sedation for intubation
4. Switching from oxygen to a mixture of oxygen and inhalational anesthetic once intubation is complete

Laryngoscopy and intubation are both very stimulating. The process of induction blunts the response to these manoeuvres while simultaneously inducing a near-coma state to prevent awareness.

=== Physiologic monitoring ===
Several monitoring technologies allow for a controlled induction of, maintenance of, and emergence from general anaesthesia. Standard for basic anesthetic monitoring is a guideline published by the ASA, which describes that the subject's oxygenation, ventilation, circulation and temperature should be continually evaluated during anesthetic.

1. Continuous electrocardiography (ECG or EKG): Electrodes are placed on the subject's skin to monitor heart rate and rhythm. This may also help the anaesthesiologist to identify early signs of heart ischaemia. Typically lead II and V5 are monitored for arrhythmias and ischemia, respectively.
2. Continuous pulse oximetry (SpO2): A device is placed, usually on a finger, to allow for early detection of a fall in a subject's hemoglobin saturation with oxygen (hypoxaemia).
3. Blood pressure monitoring: There are two methods of measuring the subject's blood pressure. The first, and most common, is non-invasive blood pressure (NIBP) monitoring. This involves placing a blood pressure cuff around the subject's arm, forearm, or leg. A machine takes blood pressure readings at regular, preset intervals throughout the surgery. The second method is invasive blood pressure (IBP) monitoring, which allows beat to beat monitoring of blood pressure. This method is reserved for subjects with significant heart or lung disease, the critically ill, and those undergoing major procedures such as cardiac or transplant surgery, or when large blood loss is expected. It involves placing a special type of plastic cannula in an artery, usually in the wrist (radial artery) or groin (femoral artery).
4. Agent concentration measurement: anaesthetic machines typically have monitors to measure the percentage of inhalational anaesthetic agents used as well as exhalation concentrations. These monitors include measuring oxygen, carbon dioxide, and inhalational anaesthetics (e.g., nitrous oxide, isoflurane).
5. Oxygen measurement: Almost all circuits have an alarm in case oxygen delivery to the subject is compromised. The alarm goes off if the fraction of inspired oxygen drops below a set threshold.
6. A circuit disconnect alarm or low pressure alarm indicates failure of the circuit to achieve a given pressure during mechanical ventilation.
7. Capnography measures the amount of carbon dioxide exhaled by the subject in percent or mmHg, allowing the anaesthesiologist to assess the adequacy of ventilation; mmHg enables the provider to see more subtle changes.
8. Temperature measurement to discern hypothermia or fever, and to allow early detection of malignant hyperthermia.
9. Electroencephalography, entropy monitoring, or other systems may be used to verify the depth of anaesthesia. This reduces the likelihood of anaesthesia awareness and of overdose.

=== Airway management ===
Anaesthetized subjects lose protective airway reflexes (such as coughing), airway patency, and sometimes a regular breathing pattern due to anaesthetics, opioids, or muscle relaxants. To maintain an open airway and regulate breathing, some form of breathing tube is inserted after the subject is unconscious. To enable mechanical ventilation, an endotracheal tube is often used, although there are alternatives such as face masks or laryngeal mask airways. Generally, full mechanical ventilation is only used if a very deep state of general anaesthesia is to be induced, and/or with a profoundly ill or injured subject.

Induction of general anaesthesia usually results in apnea and requires ventilation until the drugs wear off and spontaneous breathing starts. In other words, ventilation may be needed for induction and maintenance of general anaesthesia, or just during the induction. However, mechanical ventilation can provide ventilatory support during spontaneous breathing to ensure adequate gas exchange.

General anaesthesia can also be induced with the subject spontaneously breathing and therefore maintaining their own oxygenation which can be beneficial in certain scenarios (e.g. difficult airway or tubeless surgery). Spontaneous ventilation has been traditionally maintained with inhalational agents (i.e. halothane or sevoflurane) which is called a gas or inhalational induction. Spontaneous ventilation can also be maintained using intravenous anaesthesia (e.g. propofol). Intravenous anaesthesia to maintain spontaneous respiration has certain advantages over inhalational agents (i.e. suppressed laryngeal reflexes) but requires careful titration. Spontaneous Respiration using Intravenous anaesthesia and High-flow nasal oxygen (STRIVE Hi) is a technique that has been used in difficult and obstructed airways.

=== Eye management ===
General anaesthesia reduces the tonic contraction of the orbicularis oculi muscle, causing lagophthalmos (incomplete eye closure) in 59% of people. In addition, tear production and tear-film stability are reduced, resulting in corneal epithelial drying and reduced lysosomal protection. The protection afforded by Bell's phenomenon (in which the eyeball turns upward during sleep, protecting the cornea) is also lost. Careful management is required to reduce the likelihood of eye injuries during general anaesthesia. Some of the methods to prevent eye injury during general anesthesia includes taping the eyelids shut, use of eye ointments, and specially designed eye protective goggles.

=== Neuromuscular blockade ===
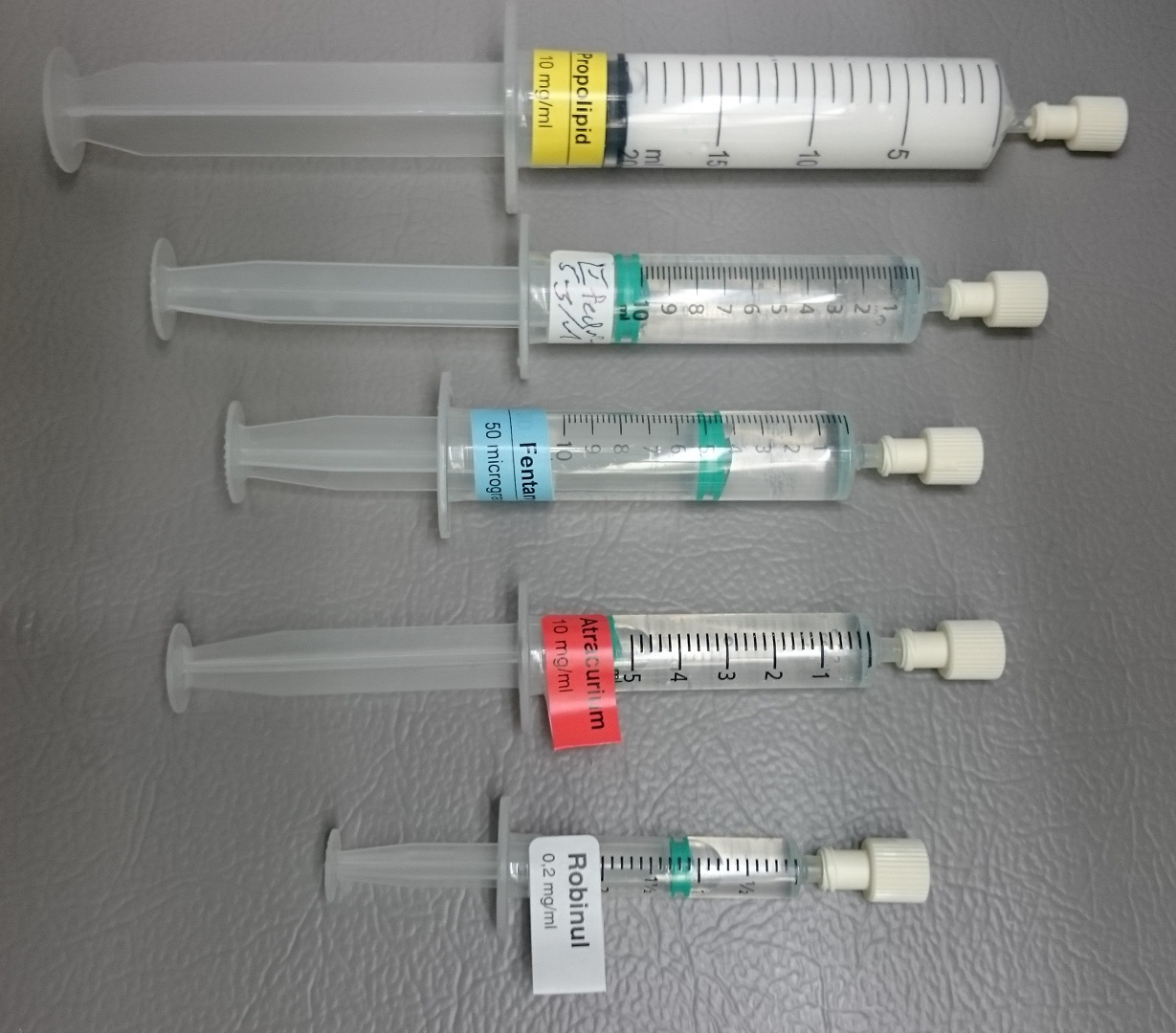
Syringes prepared with medications that are expected to be used during an operation under general anaesthesia maintained by sevoflurane gas: Propofol, a hypnotic; Ephedrine, in case of hypotension; Fentanyl, for analgesia; Atracurium, for neuromuscular block; Glycopyrronium bromide (here under trade name Robinul), reducing secretions

Paralysis, or temporary muscle relaxation with a neuromuscular blocker, is an integral part of modern anaesthesia. The first drug used for this purpose was curare, introduced in the 1940s, which has now been superseded by drugs with fewer side effects and, generally, shorter duration of action. Muscle relaxation allows surgery within major body cavities, such as the abdomen and thorax, without the need for very deep anaesthesia, and also facilitates endotracheal intubation.

Acetylcholine, a natural neurotransmitter found at the neuromuscular junction, causes muscles to contract when it is released from nerve endings. Muscle paralytic drugs work by preventing acetylcholine from attaching to its receptor. Paralysis of the muscles of respiration—the diaphragm and intercostal muscles of the chest—requires that some form of artificial respiration be implemented. Because the muscles of the larynx are also paralysed, the airway usually needs to be protected by means of an endotracheal tube.

Paralysis is most easily monitored by means of a peripheral nerve stimulator. This device intermittently sends short electrical pulses through the skin over a peripheral nerve while the contraction of a muscle supplied by that nerve is observed. The effects of muscle relaxants are commonly reversed at the end of surgery by anticholinesterase drugs, which are administered in combination with muscarinic anticholinergic drugs to minimize side effects. Examples of skeletal muscle relaxants in use today are pancuronium, rocuronium, vecuronium, cisatracurium, atracurium, mivacurium, and succinylcholine. Novel neuromuscular blockade reversal agents such as sugammadex may also be used; it works by directly binding muscle relaxants and removing it from the neuromuscular junction. Sugammadex was approved for use in the United States in 2015, and rapidly gained popularity. A study from 2022 has shown that Sugammadex and neostigmine are likely similarly safe in the reversal of neuromuscular blockade.

== Maintenance ==
The duration of action of intravenous induction agents is generally 5 to 10 minutes, after which spontaneous recovery of consciousness will occur. In order to prolong unconsciousness for the duration of surgery, anaesthesia must be maintained. This is achieved by allowing the subject to breathe a carefully controlled mixture of oxygen and a volatile anaesthetic agent, or by administering intravenous medication (usually propofol). Inhaled anaesthetic agents are also frequently supplemented by intravenous analgesic agents, such as opioids (usually fentanyl or a fentanyl derivative) and sedatives (usually propofol or midazolam). Propofol can be used for total intravenous anaesthesia (TIVA), therefore supplementation by inhalation agents is not required. General anesthesia is usually considered safe; however, there are reported cases of subjects with distortion of taste and/or smell due to local anesthetics, stroke, nerve damage, or as a side effect of general anesthesia.

At the end of surgery, administration of anaesthetic agents is discontinued. Recovery of consciousness occurs when the concentration of anaesthetic in the brain drops below a certain level (this occurs usually within 1 to 30 minutes, mostly depending on the duration of surgery).

In the 1990s, a novel method of maintaining anaesthesia was developed in Glasgow, Scotland. Called target controlled infusion (TCI), it involves using a computer-controlled syringe driver (pump) to infuse propofol throughout the duration of surgery, removing the need for a volatile anaesthetic and allowing pharmacologic principles to more precisely guide the amount of the drug used by setting the desired drug concentration. Advantages include faster recovery from anaesthesia, reduced incidence of postoperative nausea and vomiting, and absence of a trigger for malignant hyperthermia. At present, TCI is not permitted in the United States, but a syringe pump delivering a specific rate of medication is commonly used instead.

Other medications are occasionally used to treat side effects or prevent complications. They include antihypertensives to treat high blood pressure; ephedrine or phenylephrine to treat low blood pressure; salbutamol to treat asthma, laryngospasm, or bronchospasm; and epinephrine or diphenhydramine to treat allergic reactions. Glucocorticoids or antibiotics are sometimes given to prevent inflammation and infection, respectively.

== Emergence ==
Emergence is the return to baseline physiologic function of all organ systems after the cessation of general anaesthetics. This stage may be accompanied by temporary neurologic phenomena, such as agitated emergence (acute mental confusion), aphasia (impaired production or comprehension of speech), or focal impairment in sensory or motor function. Shivering is also fairly common and can be clinically significant because it causes an increase in oxygen consumption, carbon dioxide production, cardiac output, heart rate, and systemic blood pressure. The proposed mechanism is based on the observation that the spinal cord recovers at a faster rate than the brain. This results in uninhibited spinal reflexes manifested as clonic activity (shivering). This theory is supported by the fact that doxapram, a CNS stimulant, is somewhat effective in abolishing postoperative shivering. Cardiovascular events such as increased or decreased blood pressure, rapid heart rate, or other cardiac dysrhythmias are also common during emergence from general anaesthesia, as are respiratory symptoms such as dyspnoea. Responding and following verbal command, is a criterion commonly utilized to assess the subject's readiness for tracheal extubation.

== Postoperative care ==
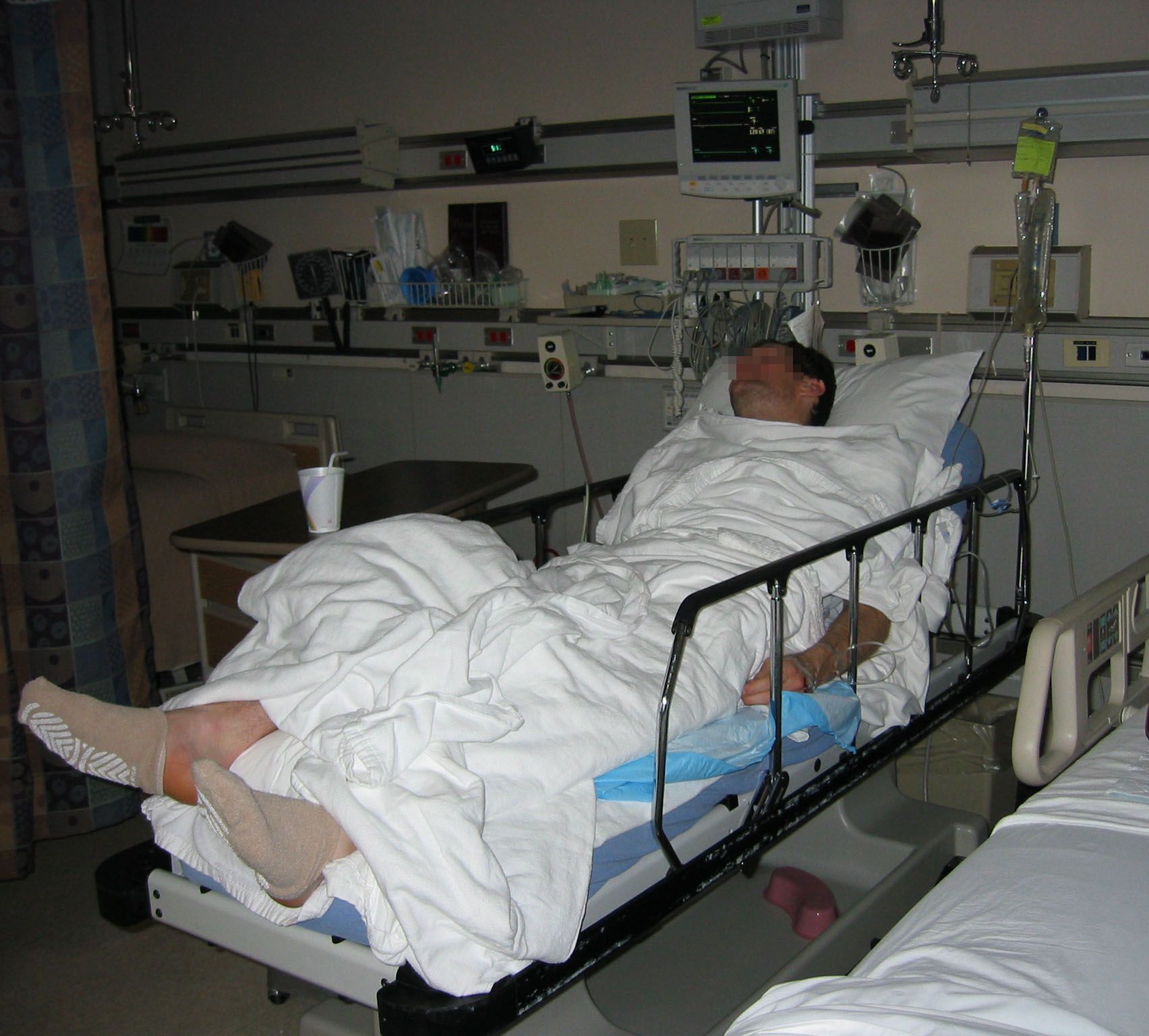
Anaesthetized patient in postoperative recovery.

Postoperative pain is managed in the anaesthesia recovery unit (PACU) with regional analgesia or oral, transdermal, or parenteral medication. Subjects may be given opioids, as well as other medications like non steroidal anti-inflammatory drugs and acetaminophen. For human patients, opioid medication is sometimes administered by the patient themselves using a system called a patient controlled analgesic. The patient presses a button to activate a syringe device and receive a preset dose or "bolus" of the drug, usually a strong opioid such as morphine, fentanyl, or oxycodone (e.g., one milligram of morphine). The PCA device then "locks out" for a preset period to allow the drug to take effect, and also prevent the patient from overdosing. If the patient becomes too sleepy or sedated, they make no more requests. This confers a fail-safe aspect that is lacking in continuous-infusion techniques. If these medications cannot effectively manage the pain, local anesthetic may be directly injected to the nerve in a procedure called a nerve block.

In the recovery unit, many vital signs are monitored, including oxygen saturation, heart rhythm and respiration, blood pressure, and core body temperature.

Postanesthetic shivering is common. Apart from causing discomfort and exacerbating pain, shivering has been shown to increase oxygen consumption, catecholamine release, risk for hypothermia, and induce lactic acidosis. A number of techniques are used to reduce shivering, such as warm blankets, or wrapping the patient in a sheet that circulates warmed air, called a bair hugger. If the shivering cannot be managed with external warming devices, drugs such as dexmedetomidine, or other α2-agonists, anticholinergics, central nervous system stimulants, or corticosteroids may be used.

In many cases, opioids used in general anaesthesia can cause postoperative ileus, even after non-abdominal surgery. Administration of a μ-opioid antagonist such as alvimopan immediately after surgery can help accelerate the timing of hospital discharge, but does not reduce the development of paralytic ileus.

Enhanced Recovery After Surgery (ERAS) is a society that provides up-to-date guidelines and consensus to ensure continuity of care and improve recovery and peri-operative care. Adherence to the pathway and guidelines has been shown to associate with improved post-operative outcomes and lower costs to the health care system.

== Perioperative mortality ==
Most perioperative mortality is attributable to complications from the operation, such as haemorrhage, sepsis, and failure of vital organs. Over the last several decades, the overall anesthesia related mortality rate improved significantly for anaesthetics administered. Advancements in monitoring equipment, anaesthetic agents, and increased focus on perioperative safety are some reasons for the decrease in perioperative mortality. In the United States, the current estimated anaesthesia-related mortality is about 1.1 per million population per year. The highest death rates were found in the geriatric population, especially those 85 and older. A review from 2018 examined perioperative anaesthesia interventions and their impact on anaesthesia-related mortality. Interventions found to reduce mortality include pharmacotherapy, ventilation, transfusion, nutrition, glucose control, dialysis and medical device. A randomized controlled trial from 2022 found that there is no significant difference in mortality between patient receiving handover from one clinician to another compared to the control group.

Mortality directly related to anaesthetic management is rare but may be caused by pulmonary aspiration of gastric contents, asphyxiation, or anaphylaxis. These in turn may result from malfunction of anaesthesia-related equipment or, more commonly, human error. In 1984, after a television programme highlighting anaesthesia mishaps aired in the United States, American anaesthesiologist Ellison C. Pierce appointed the Anesthesia Patient Safety and Risk Management Committee within the American Society of Anesthesiologists. This committee was tasked with determining and reducing the causes of anaesthesia-related morbidity and mortality. An outgrowth of this committee, the Anesthesia Patient Safety Foundation, was created in 1985 as an independent, nonprofit corporation with the goal "that no patient shall be harmed by anesthesia".

The rare but major complication of general anaesthesia is malignant hyperthermia. According to guidelines, all major hospitals have a protocol in place with an emergency drug cart near the operating room for this potential complication.

== Criminal use ==
General anaesthesia is frequently used by offenders used to facilitate crimes such as sexual assault and kidnapping. Because of this, anaesthetic drugs are highly controlled.

== See also ==
- Local anaesthesia
