= Coinduction (anesthetics) =

Technique in anesthesia

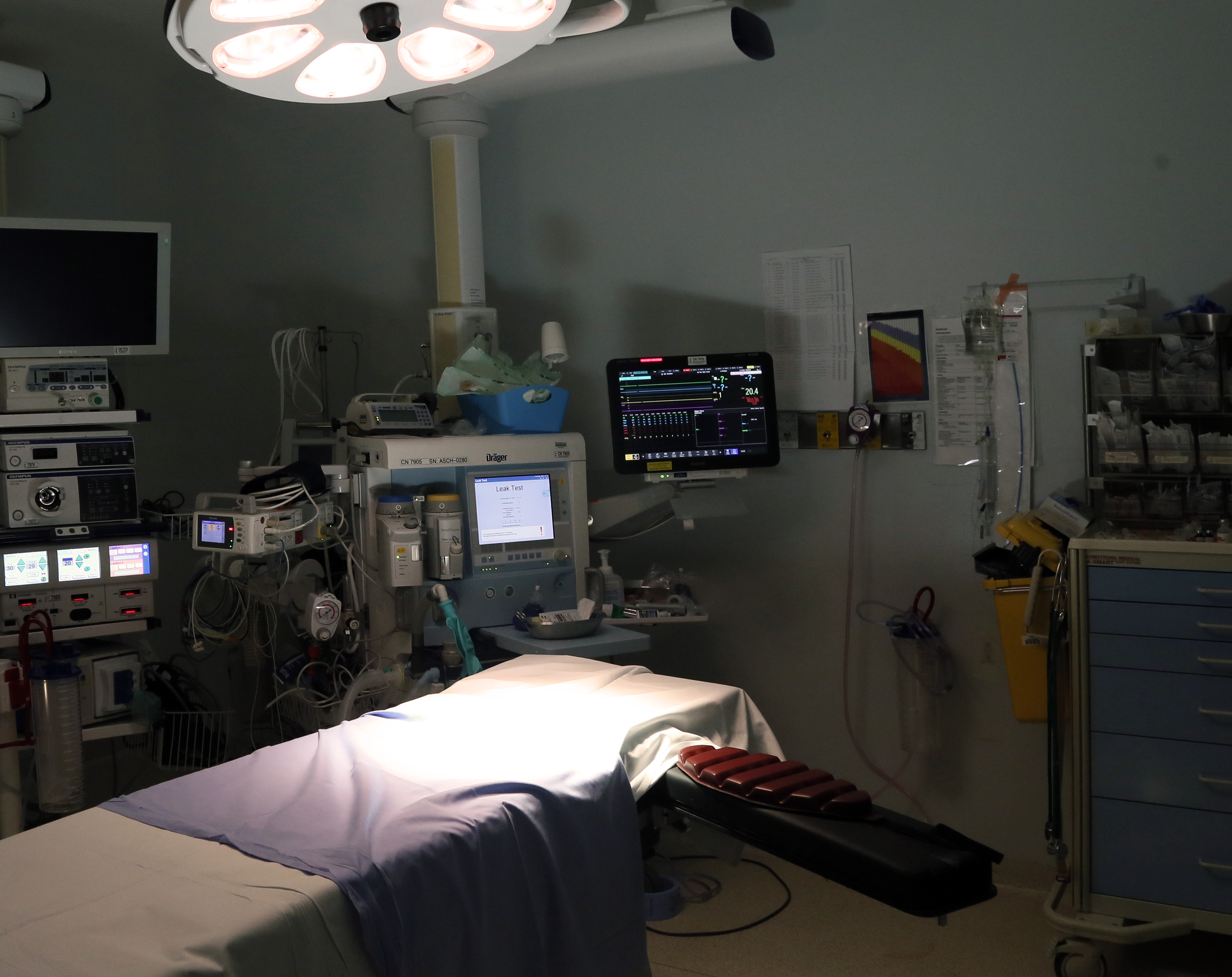
The anesthetic area of an operating room. Induction of anesthesia, where the patient loses consciousness and passes through the Guedel stages of anesthesia, commonly takes place here.

Coinduction in anesthesia is a pharmacological tool whereby a combination of sedative drugs may be used to greater effect than a single agent, achieving a smoother onset of general anesthesia. The use of coinduction allows lower doses of the same anesthetic agents to be used which provides enhanced safety, faster recovery, fewer side-effects, and more predictable pharmacodynamics. Coinduction is used in human medicine and veterinary medicine as standard practice to provide optimum anesthetic induction. The onset or induction phase of anesthesia is a critical period involving the loss of consciousness and reactivity in the patient, and is arguably the most dangerous period of a general anesthetic. A great variety of coinduction combinations are in use and selection is dependent on the patient's age and health, the specific situation, and the indication for anesthesia. As with all forms of anesthesia the resources available in the environment are a key factor.

== Commonly used coinduction regimens ==
A standard coinduction regimen for an adult might consist of a benzodiazepine sedative amnesic such as midazolam, followed by an opioid analgesic with further sedating properties such as fentanyl which has a fast onset, then an intravenous induction agent: propofol. A muscle relaxant such as atracurium would be administered after this, though this would not strictly be a part of coinduction. For a child on the other hand, a commonly used regimen would be fentanyl, ketamin and rocuronium. In all cases the choice of agents would be tailored to the situation; for a neonatal intubation the aforementioned regimes would be inappropriate as sedation and especially amnesia are less important. Fentanyl alone would be used, followed by the short-action muscle relaxant suxamethonium: coinduction is typically not used in neonatal anesthesia.
