= Guedel =

Guedel is a surname. Notable people with the surname include:

- Arthur Ernest Guedel (1883–1956), American anesthesiologist
- John Guedel (1913–2001), American radio and television producer
- Kaloust Guedel (born 1956), Cyprus-born American artist of Armenian descent
