= Eye injuries during general anaesthesia =

Eye injuries during general anaesthesia are reasonably common if care is not taken to prevent them.

== Incidence of eye injuries ==
The incidence of eye injuries during general anaesthesia has been studied, and different methods of eye protection have been compared.

When eyes are untaped during general anaesthesia, the incidence of ocular injury has been reported to be as high as 44%. If tape is used to hold the eyes closed, ocular injury occurs during 0.1-0.5% of general anaesthetics, and is usually corneal in nature.

Intraoperative eye injuries account for 2% of medico-legal claims against anaesthetists in Australia and United Kingdom, and 3% in the USA.

== Effect of general anaesthesia on eyes ==
General anaesthesia reduces the tonic contraction of the orbicularis oculi muscle, causing lagophthalmos i.e. the eyelids do not close fully in 59% of patients.

In addition, general anaesthesia reduces tear production and tear-film stability, resulting in corneal epithelial drying and reduced lysosomal protection. The protection afforded by Bell's phenomenon (in which the eyeball turns upwards during sleep, protecting the cornea) is also lost during general anaesthesia.

== Mechanism of injury ==
Corneal abrasions are the most common injury; they are caused by direct trauma, exposure keratopathy/keratitis or chemical injury.

An open eye increases the vulnerability of the cornea to direct trauma from objects such as face masks, laryngoscopes, identification badges, stethoscopes, surgical instruments, anaesthetic circuits, and drapes.

Exposure keratopathy/keratitis refers to the drying of the cornea with subsequent epithelial breakdown. When the cornea dries out it may stick to the eyelid and cause an abrasion when the eye reopens.

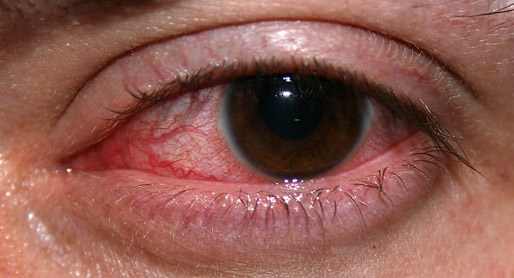
Exposure keratitis

Chemical injury can occur if cleaning solutions such as povidone-iodine (Betadine), chlorhexidine or alcohol are inadvertently spilt into the eye, for example when the face, neck or shoulder is being prepped for surgery.

Therefore, the anaesthetist ensures that the eyes are fully closed and remain closed throughout the procedure. Seemingly trivial contact can result in corneal abrasions and the risk of this occurring is markedly increased if exposure keratopathy is already present. Corneal abrasions can be excruciatingly painful in the postoperative period, may hamper postoperative rehabilitation and may require ongoing ophthalmological review and after care. In extreme cases there may be partial or complete visual loss.

Iatrogenic injury of the eyelids is also common. Bruising (frequently) and tearing (rarely) of the eyelid can occur when the adhesive dressing used to hold the eye closed is removed. Removal of eyelashes can also occur.

== Methods available for eye injury prevention ==
Methods to prevent intraoperative corneal injuries include

- simple manual closure of the eyelids
- holding the eyelids shut with tape or a general purpose adhesive dressing
- use of a specially designed eyelid occlusion dressing
- use of eye ointment (although this is controversial, see below)
- bio-occlusive dressings
- suture tarsorrhaphy

However, none of the protective strategies are completely effective; vigilance is always required i.e. the eyes need to be inspected regularly throughout surgery to check they are closed.

== Discussion of methods ==
The most commonly employed method is to use tape or a general purpose adhesive dressing. Unfortunately the adhesive used on the tape or dressing will generally be inappropriate for this use. The adhesive strength may change when reaching body temperature, or over time.

As the operation progresses this can cause the adhesive to stop working and become gooey, allowing the eyelids to move apart, and leaving behind a sticky residue. This leaves the cornea exposed to epithelial drying and/or abrasions, sometimes caused by the tape that was originally applied to protect the cornea. Alternatively, the adhesive strength may increase, which upon removal can result in eyelid bruising, tears, or eyelash removal.

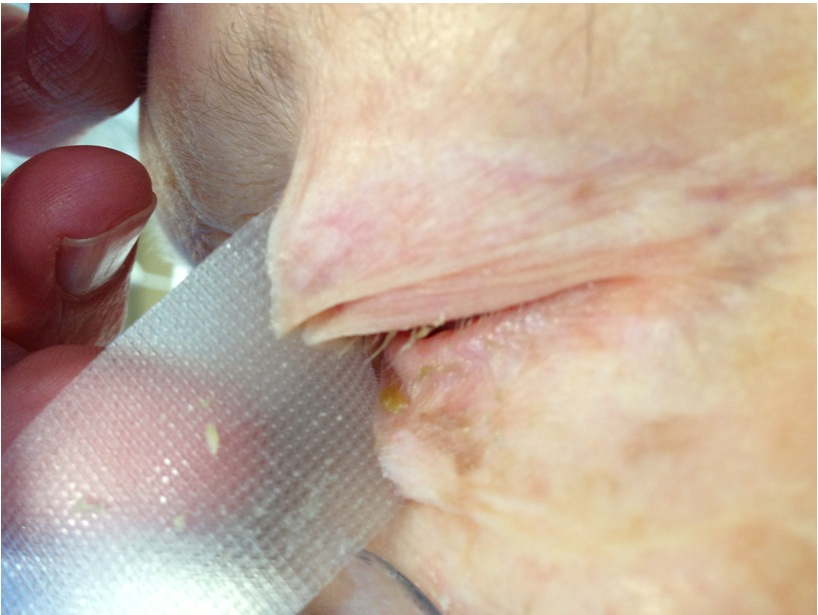
Tape being removed off eye

Rolls of tapes are often "laying around" the operating theatre or kept in health care workers' pockets.

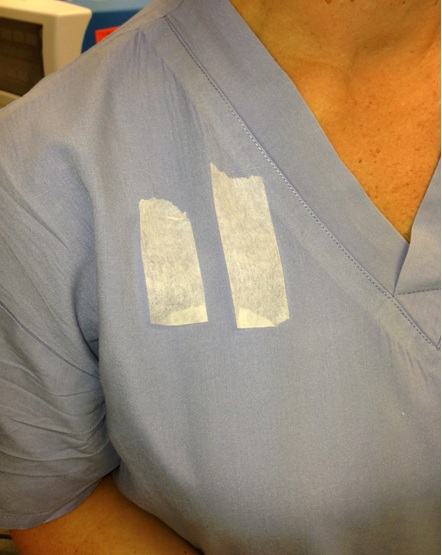
Tape awaiting placement

Therefore, they can be a source of hospital-acquired infections (HAI's) such as Methicillin-resistant Staphylococcus aureus (MRSA) & Vancomycin-resistant Enterococcus (VRE), with a 2010 study showing that 50% of partially used tape rolls tested positive for MRSA, VRE or both.

Most tapes and dressings are non-transparent and so it is not possible to see if the patient's eyes are opened or closed throughout the case. It is not uncommon for the eyelids to move open as the case progresses, even with adhesive tapes stuck onto them. In a practical sense, these medical tapes/dressings may be difficult to remove from a patient because their ends can become stuck flush with the skin. The possibility of tape removal causing trauma is also significantly increased in older people, people with sensitive skin, dermatitis, dehydration or side effects of medications.

As noted above, there have been several studies looking at the efficacy and safety of eye ointments/lubricants as adjuncts with tape or as a stand-alone management for intra-operative eye closure. Unfortunately many in common use have problems. Petroleum gel is flammable and is best avoided when electrocautery and open oxygen are to be used around the face. Preservative-free eye ointment is preferred, as preservative can cause corneal epithelial sloughing and conjunctival hyperemia. They have been implicated in blurred vision in up to 75% of patients and they do not protect from direct trauma.

Specially made eyelid occlusion dressings are available commercially, such as EyeGard (manufactured in the US by KMI Surgical and marketed by Sharn Anesthesia), EyePro (Innovgas Pty Ltd, Australia) and Anesthesia-Aid (Sperian Protection). These dressings overcome most of the problems associated with tape or general purpose dressings.

== Adverse outcomes associated with intra-operative eye injuries ==
Some of the adverse outcomes associated with intra-operative injuries include:

- Increased length of stay. This is due to ophthalmology consults required, associated infections and treatment.
- Increased costs. This is due to increased length of stay, cost of treating the complications.
- Pain and discomfort for the patient. Corneal abrasions are extremely painful for the patient and the treatment consists of drops and ointments applied in the eye which may cause further discomfort for the patient.
