= Charles Bell =

Scottish surgeon, anatomist, artist and theologian (1774–1842)

Sir Charles Bell KH FRS FRSE FRCSE
- portrait by John Stevens
- Born: 12 November 1774; Edinburgh, Scotland
- Died: 28 April 1842 (aged 67); Hallow, Worcestershire, England
- Education: University of Edinburgh
- Known for: Authority on the human nervous system
- Awards: Royal Medal (1829)
- Scientific career
- Fields: Anatomy
- Workplaces: Surgeon, Edinburgh Royal Infirmary (1799–); Practising surgeon, London (1804–); Principal lecturer, Great Windmill Street School of Anatomy (1812–25); Lectured at Middlesex Hospital etc (1812–36); Professor of Surgery, Edinburgh University (1836–42)

Notes
- Author of "Treatise on Animal Mechanics", "An Essay on the Hand, its Mechanism and Vital Endowments as Evincing Design"

Sir Charles Bell KH FRS FRSE FRCSE MWS (12 November 1774 – 28 April 1842) was a Scottish surgeon, anatomist, physiologist, neurologist, artist, and philosophical theologian. Bell discovered the difference between sensory nerves and motor nerves in the spinal cord, and also described Bell's palsy.

His three older brothers included Robert Bell (1757–1816) a Writer to the Signet, John Bell (1763–1820), also a noted surgeon and writer; and the advocate George Joseph Bell (1770–1843) who became a professor of law at the University of Edinburgh and a principal clerk at the Court of Session.

== Early life and education ==
Charles Bell was born in Edinburgh on 12 November 1774, as the fourth son of the Reverend William Bell, a clergyman of the Scottish Episcopal Church. Charles's father died in 1779 when he was five years old, so his mother had a unique influence on his early life, teaching him how to read and write. In addition to this, his mother also helped Charles's natural artistic ability by paying for his regular drawing and painting lessons from David Allan, a well-known Scottish painter. Charles Bell grew up in Edinburgh, and attended the prestigious High School (1784–88). Although he was not a particularly good student, Charles decided to follow in his brother John's footsteps and enter a career in medicine. In 1792, Charles Bell enrolled at the University of Edinburgh and began assisting his brother John as a surgical apprentice. While at the university, Bell attended the lectures of Dugald Stewart on the subject of spiritual philosophy. These lectures had considerable impact on Bell, for some of Stewart's teachings can be traced in Bell's later works in a passage on his Treatise on the Hand. In addition to classes on anatomy, Bell took a course on the art of drawing in order to refine his artistic skill. At the university he was also a member of the Royal Medical Society as a student and spoke at the Society's centenary celebrations in 1837.

In 1798, Bell graduated from the University of Edinburgh and soon after was admitted to the Edinburgh College of Surgeons where he taught anatomy and operated at the Edinburgh Royal Infirmary. While developing his talents as a surgeon, Bell's interests forayed into a field combining anatomy and art. His inherent talent as an artist came to the fore when he helped his brother complete a four-volume work called The Anatomy of the Human Body. Charles Bell completely wrote and illustrated volumes 3 and 4 in 1803, as well as publishing his own set of illustrations in a System of Dissections in 1798 and 1799. Furthermore, Bell used his clinical experience and artistic eye to develop the hobby of modelling interesting medical cases in wax. He proceeded to accumulate an extensive collection that he dubbed his Museum of Anatomy, some items of which can still be seen today at Surgeon's Hall.

Charles Bell's stay in Edinburgh did not last long due to an infamous feud between John Bell and two faculty members at the University of Edinburgh: Alexander Monro Secundus and John Gregory. John Gregory was the chairman of the Royal Infirmary and had declared that only six full-time surgical staff members would be appointed to work at the infirmary. The Bell brothers were not selected and thus barred from practicing medicine at the Royal Infirmary. Charles Bell, who was not directly involved in his brother's feuds, attempted to make a deal with the faculty of the University of Edinburgh by offering the university one hundred guineas and his Museum of Anatomy in exchange for allowing him to observe and sketch the operations performed at the Royal Infirmary, but this deal was rejected.

== Professional career ==
In 1804, Charles Bell left for London and in 1805 had established himself in the city by buying a house on Leicester Street. From this house Bell taught classes in anatomy and surgery for medical students, doctors, and artists. In 1809, Bell was among a number of civilian surgeons who volunteered to attend to the many thousands of ill and wounded soldiers who had retreated to Corunna, and 6 years later he again voluntarily attended to the ill and wounded in the aftermath of the Battle of Waterloo. Regrettably, of Bell's 12 amputation cases, only one man survived. In addition to the amputation surgeries, Bell was quite fascinated by musket-ball injuries and in 1814, he published a Dissertation on Gunshot Wounds. A number of his illustrations of the wounds are displayed in the hall of the Royal College of Surgeons of Edinburgh.

In 1811, Charles Bell married Marion Shaw. Using money from his wife's dowry, Bell purchased a share of the Great Windmill Street School of Anatomy which had been founded by the anatomist William Hunter. Bell transferred his practice from his house to the Windmill Street School. Bell ended up teaching students and conducting his own research until 1824. In 1813–14, he was appointed as a member of the London College of Surgeons and as a surgeon at the Middlesex Hospital.

In addition to his domestic pursuits, Bell also served as a military surgeon, making elaborate recordings of neurological injuries at the Royal Hospital Haslar and famously documenting his experiences at Waterloo in 1815. For three consecutive days and nights, he operated on French soldiers in the Gens d'Armerie Hospital. The condition of the French soldiers was quite poor, and thus many of his patients died shortly after he operated on them. Dr Robert Knox, who was one of Bell's surgical assistants at Brussels, was critical of Bell's surgical skills and commented rather negatively on Bell's surgical abilities; (the mortality rate of amputations carried out by Bell ran at about 90%).

Bell was instrumental in the creation of the Middlesex Hospital Medical School, and became, in 1824, the first professor of Anatomy and Surgery of the College of Surgeons in London. In that same year Bell sold his collection of over 3,000 wax preparations to the Royal College of Surgeons of Edinburgh for £3000.

In 1829, the Windmill Street School of Anatomy was incorporated into the new King's College London. Bell was invited to be its first professor of physiology, and helped establish the Medical School at the University of London, gave the inaugural address when it formally opened, and even helped contribute to the requirements of its certification programme. Bell's stay at the Medical School did not last long and he resigned from his chair due to differences of opinion with the academic staff. For the next seven years, Bell gave clinical lectures at the Middlesex Hospital and in 1835 he accepted the position of the Chair of Surgery at the University of Edinburgh following the premature death of Prof John William Turner.

He was made a Knight of the Royal Guelphic Order in 1833.

Bell died at Hallow Park in Worcestershire, while travelling from Edinburgh to London, in 1842. He is buried in Hallow churchyard near Worcester.

== Honours and awards ==
Bell was elected a Fellow of the Royal Society of Edinburgh on 8 June 1807, on the nomination of Robert Jameson, William Wright and Thomas Macknight. He served as a Councillor of the RSE from 1836 to 1839.

He was elected a Fellow of the Royal Society of London on 16 November 1826, and awarded the Royal Society's gold medal for his numerous discoveries in science. Bell was knighted into the Guelphic Order of Hanover in 1831. Like Sir Richard Owen, he was also elected a foreign member of the Royal Swedish Academy of Sciences.

== Works ==
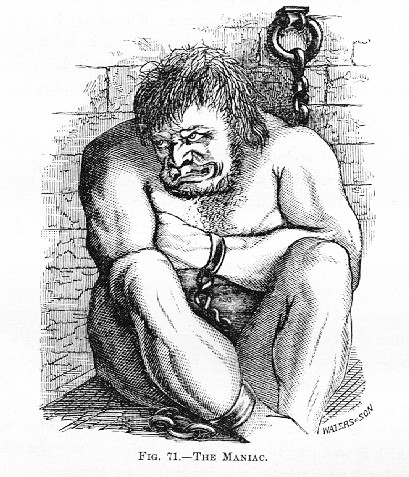
The Maniac by Charles Bell (1806)

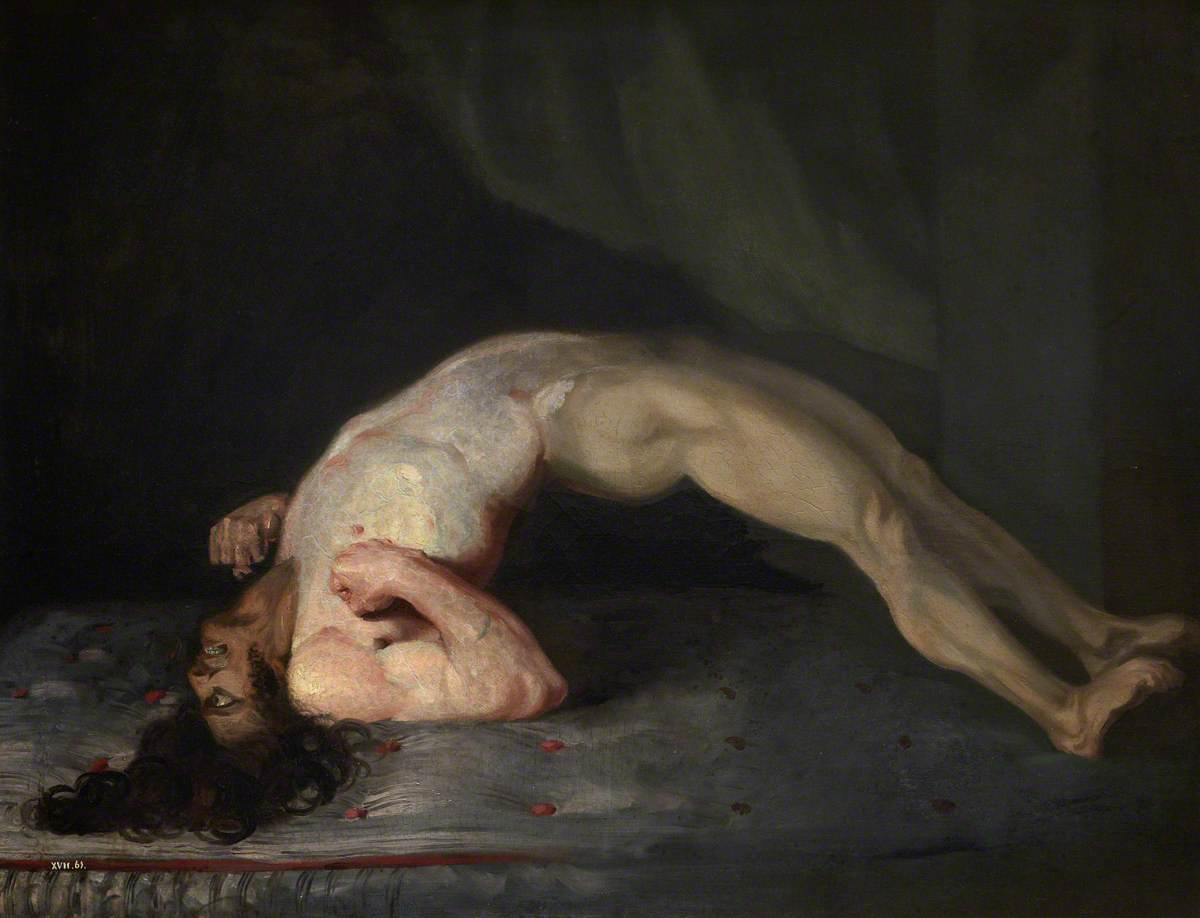
Opisthotonus (Tetanus) by Charles Bell (1809)

Charles Bell was a prolific author who combined his anatomical knowledge with his artistic eye to produce a number of highly detailed and beautifully illustrated books. In 1799, Bell published his first work "A System of Dissections, explaining the Anatomy of the Human Body, the manner of displaying Parts and their Varieties in Disease". His second work was the completion of his brother's four-volume set of "The Anatomy of the Human Body" in 1803. In that same year, Bell published his three series of engravings titled "Engravings of the Arteries", "Engravings of the Brain", and "Engravings of the Nerves". These sets of engravings consisted of intricate and detailed anatomical diagrams accompanied with labels and a brief description of their functionality in the human body and were published as an educational tool for aspiring medical students. The "Engravings of the Brain" are of particular importance for this marked Bell's first published attempt at fully elucidating the organization of the nervous system. In his introduction to the work, Bell comments on the ambiguous nature of the brain and its inner workings, a topic that would hold his interest for the remainder of his life.

In 1806, with his eye on a teaching post at the Royal Academy, Bell published his Essays on The Anatomy of Expression in Painting (1806), later re-published as Essays on The Anatomy and Philosophy of Expression in 1824. In this work, Bell followed the principles of natural theology, asserting the existence of a uniquely human system of facial muscles in the service of a human species with a unique relationship to the Creator, ideals which paralleled with those of William Paley. After the failure of his application (Sir Thomas Lawrence, later President of the Royal Academy, described Bell as "lacking in temper, modesty and judgement"), Bell turned his attentions to the nervous system.

Bell published detailed studies of the nervous system in 1811, in his privately circulated book An Idea of a New Anatomy of the Brain. In this book, Bell described his idea of the different nervous tracts connecting with different parts of brain and thus leading to different functionality. His experiments to investigate this consisted of cutting open the spinal cord of a rabbit and touching different columns of the cord. He found that an irritation of the anterior columns led to a convulsion of the muscles, while an irritation of the posterior columns had no visible effect. These experiments led Bell to declare that he was the first to distinguish between sensory and motor nerves. While this essay is considered by many to be the founding stone of clinical neurology, it was not well received by Bell's peers. His experimentation was criticized and the idea that he presented of the anterior and posterior roots being connected to the cerebrum and cerebellum respectively, was rejected. Furthermore, Bell's original essay of 1811 did not actually contain a clear description of motor and sensory nerve roots as Bell later claimed, and he seems to have issued subsequent incorrectly dated revisions with subtle textual alterations.

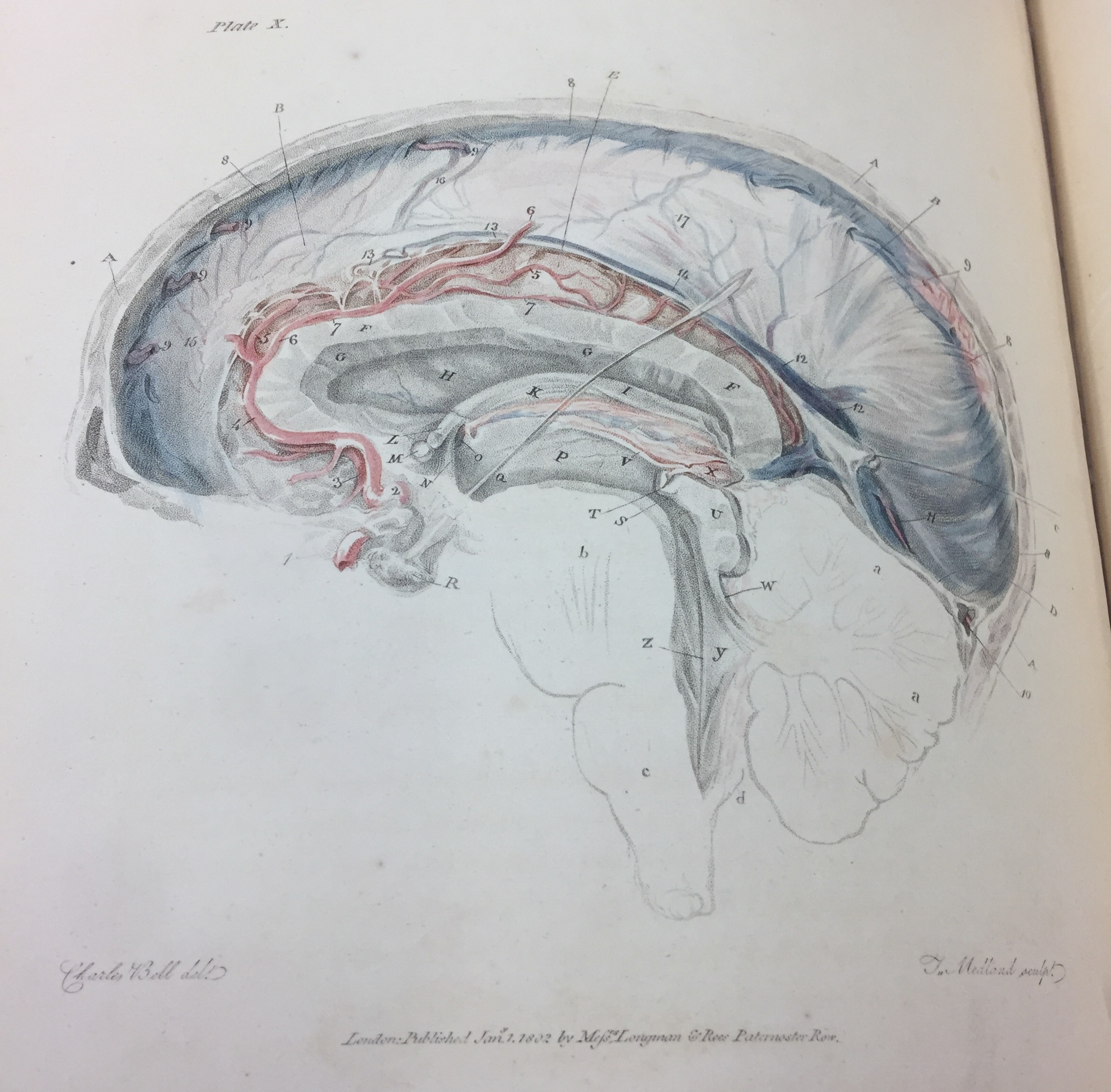
Plate 10 from "Anatomy of the Brain Explained in a Series of Engravings" Image credited to Special Collections Research Center, University of Chicago Library.

Despite this lukewarm response, Charles Bell continued to study the anatomy of the human brain and laid his focus upon the nerves connected to it. In 1821, Bell published the "On the Nerves: Giving an Account of some Experiments on Their Structure and Functions, Which Lead to a New Arrangement of the System" in Philosophical Transactions of the Royal Society. This paper held Bell's most famous discovery, that the facial nerve or seventh cranial nerve is a nerve of muscular action. This was quite an important discovery because surgeons would often cut this nerve as an attempted cure for facial neuralgia, but this would often render the patient with a unilateral paralysis of the facial muscles, now known as Bell's Palsy. Due to this publication, Charles Bell is regarded as one of the first physicians to combine the scientific study of neuroanatomy with clinical practice.

Bell's studies on emotional expression played a catalytic role in the development of Darwin's considerations of the origins of human emotional life; and, while he rejected Bell's theological arguments, Darwin very much agreed with Bell's emphasis on the expressive role of the muscles of respiration. Darwin detailed these opinions in his The Expression of the Emotions in Man and Animals (1872), written with the active collaboration of the psychiatrist James Crichton-Browne. Bell was one of the first physicians to combine the scientific study of neuroanatomy with clinical practice. In 1821, he described in the trajectory of the facial nerve and a disease, Bell's Palsy which led to the unilateral paralysis of facial muscles, in one of the classics of neurology, a paper delivered to the Royal Society entitled On the Nerves: Giving an Account of some Experiments on Their Structure and Functions, Which Lead to a New Arrangement of the System.

Bell also combined his many artistic, scientific, literary and teaching talents in a number of wax preparations and detailed anatomical and surgical illustrations, paintings and engravings in his several books on these subjects, such as in his book Illustrations of the Great Operations of Surgery: Trepan, Hernia, Amputation, Aneurism, and Lithotomy (1821). He wrote also the first treatise on notions of anatomy and physiology of facial expression for painters and illustrators, titled Essays on the Anatomy of Expression in Painting (1806).

In 1829, Francis Egerton, the eighth Earl of Bridgewater, died and in his will, he left a large sum of money to the President of the Royal Society of London. The will stipulated that the money was to be used to write, print, and publish one thousand copies of a work on the Power, Wisdom, and Goodness of God. The President of the Royal Society, Davies Gilbert appointed eight gentlemen to write separate treatises on the subject. In 1833, he published the fourth Bridgewater Treatise, The Hand: Its Mechanism and Vital Endowments as Evincing Design. Charles Bell published four editions of The Hand. In the first few chapters, Bell organizes his treatise as an early textbook of comparative anatomy. The book is full of pictures where Bell compares "hands" of different organisms ranging from human hands, chimpanzee paws, and fish feelers. After the first few chapters, Bell orients his treatise around the significance of the hand and its importance in its use in anatomy. He emphasizes that the hand is as important as the eye in the field of surgery and that it must be trained.

== Legacy ==
A number of discoveries received his name:

- Bell's (external respiratory) nerve: The long thoracic nerve.
- Bell's palsy: a unilateral idiopathic paralysis of facial muscles due to a lesion of the facial nerve.
- Bell's phenomenon: A normal defense mechanism—upward and outward movement of the eye which occurs when an individual closes their eyes forcibly. It can be appreciated clinically in a patient with paralysis of the orbicularis oculi (e.g. Guillain–Barré syndrome or Bell's palsy), as the eyelid remains elevated when the patient tries to close the eye.
- Bell's spasm: Involuntary twitching of the facial muscles.
- Bell–Magendie law or Bell's Law: States that the anterior branch of spinal nerve roots contain only motor fibers and the posterior roots contain only sensory fibers.

Charles Bell House, part of University College London, is used for teaching and research in surgery.
