= Oropharyngeal airway =

Medical device used to maintain or open a patient's airway

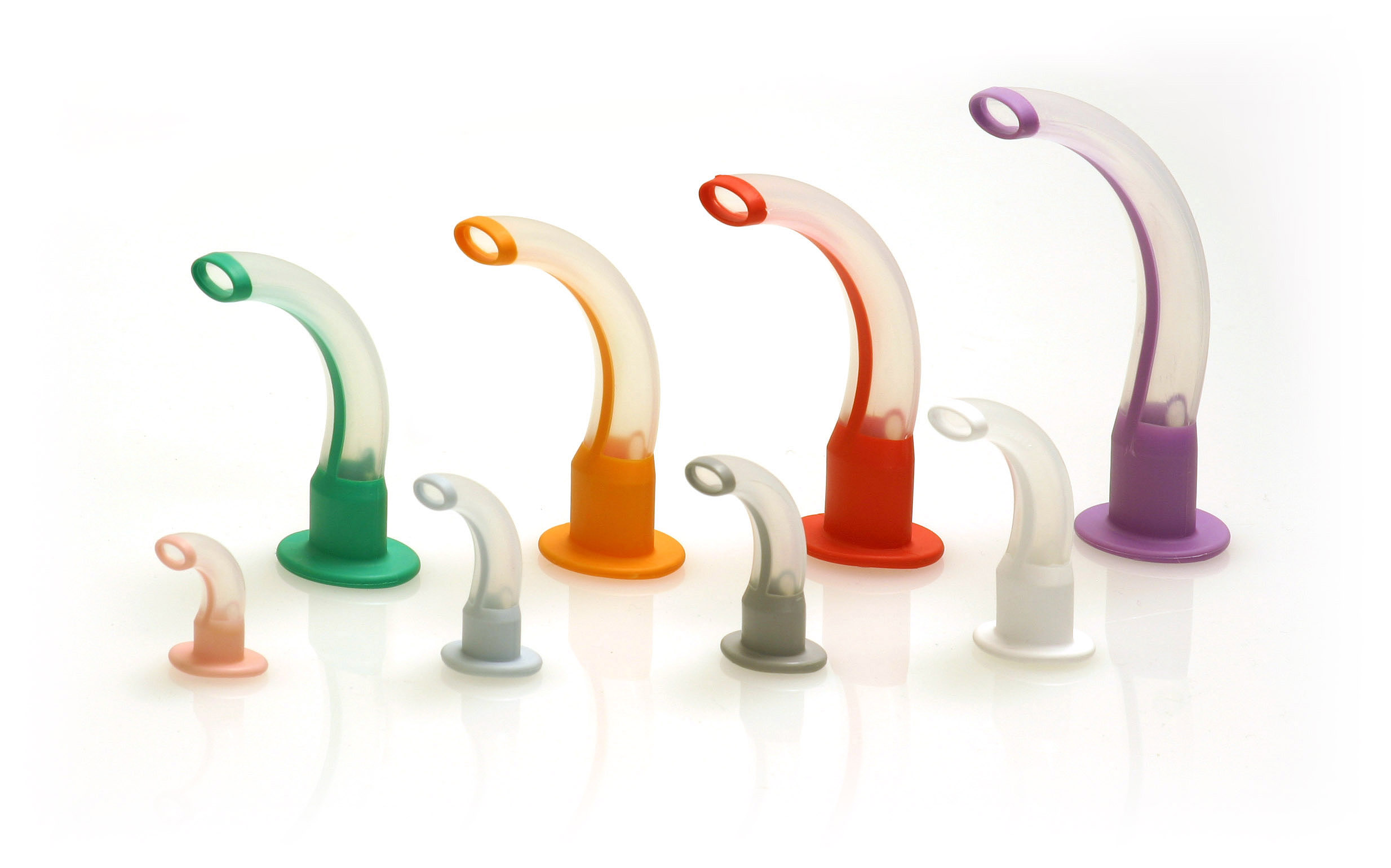
- Guedel airways
- ICD-9-CM: 96.02

An oropharyngeal airway (also known as an oral airway, OPA or Guedel pattern airway) is a medical device called an Airway Adjunct used in airway management to maintain or open a patient's airway. It does this by preventing the tongue from covering the epiglottis, which could prevent the person from breathing. When a person becomes unconscious, the muscles in their jaw relax and allow the tongue to obstruct the airway.

== History and usage ==
The oropharyngeal airway was designed by Arthur Guedel.

Oropharyngeal airways come in a variety of sizes, from infant to adult, and are used commonly in pre-hospital emergency care and for short term airway management post anaesthetic or when manual methods are inadequate to maintain an open airway. This piece of equipment is utilized by certified first responders, emergency medical technicians, paramedics, anesthesia providers, and other health professionals when tracheal intubation is either not available, not advisable or the problem is of short term duration.

Oropharyngeal airways are indicated only in unconscious people, because of the likelihood that the device would stimulate a gag reflex in conscious or semi-conscious persons. This could result in vomiting and potentially lead to an obstructed airway. Nasopharyngeal airways are mostly used instead as they do not stimulate a gag reflex.

In general, oropharyngeal airways need to be sized and inserted correctly to maximize effectiveness and minimize possible complications, such as oral trauma.

== Insertion ==
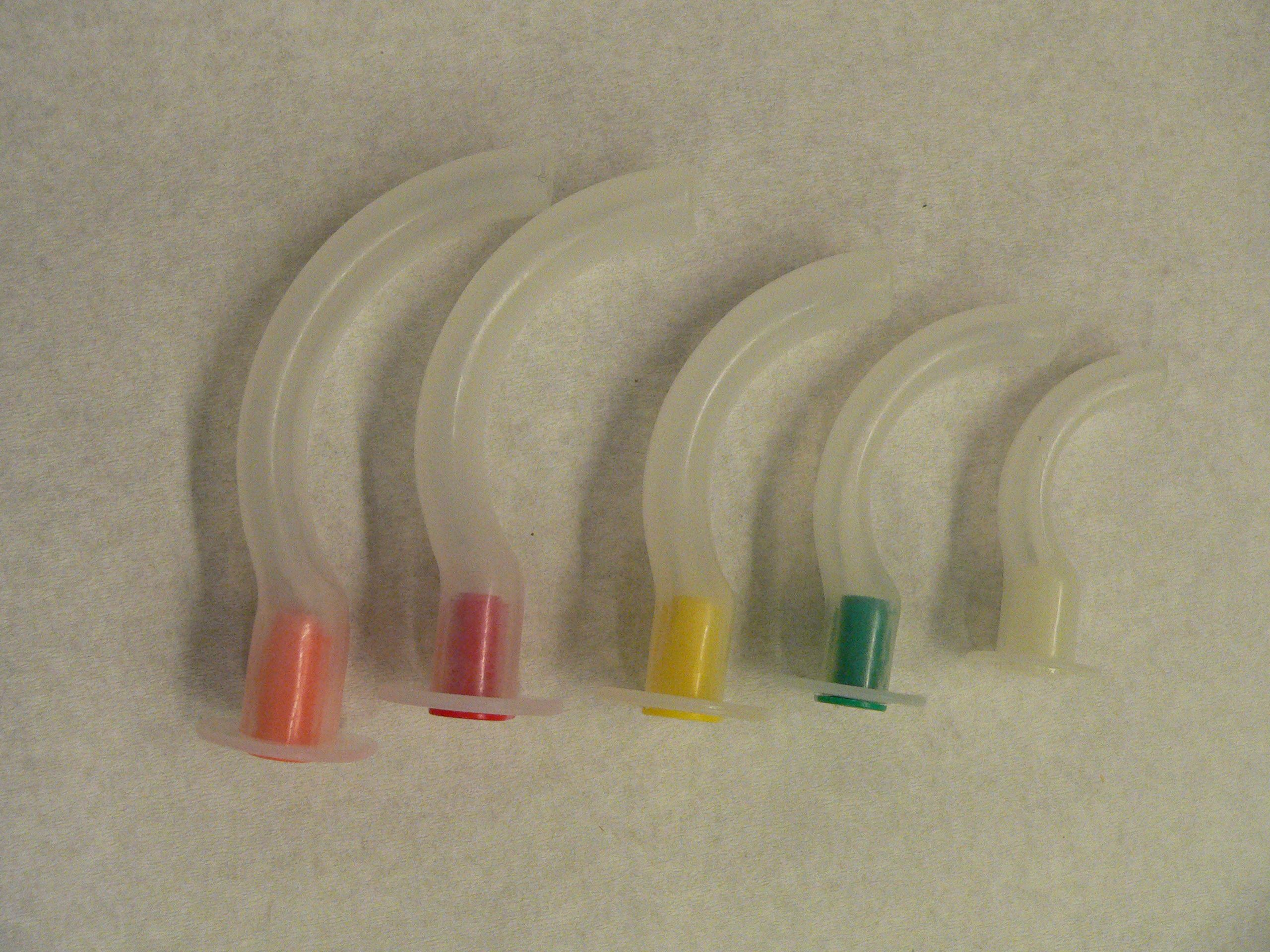
OP airways in varying sizes

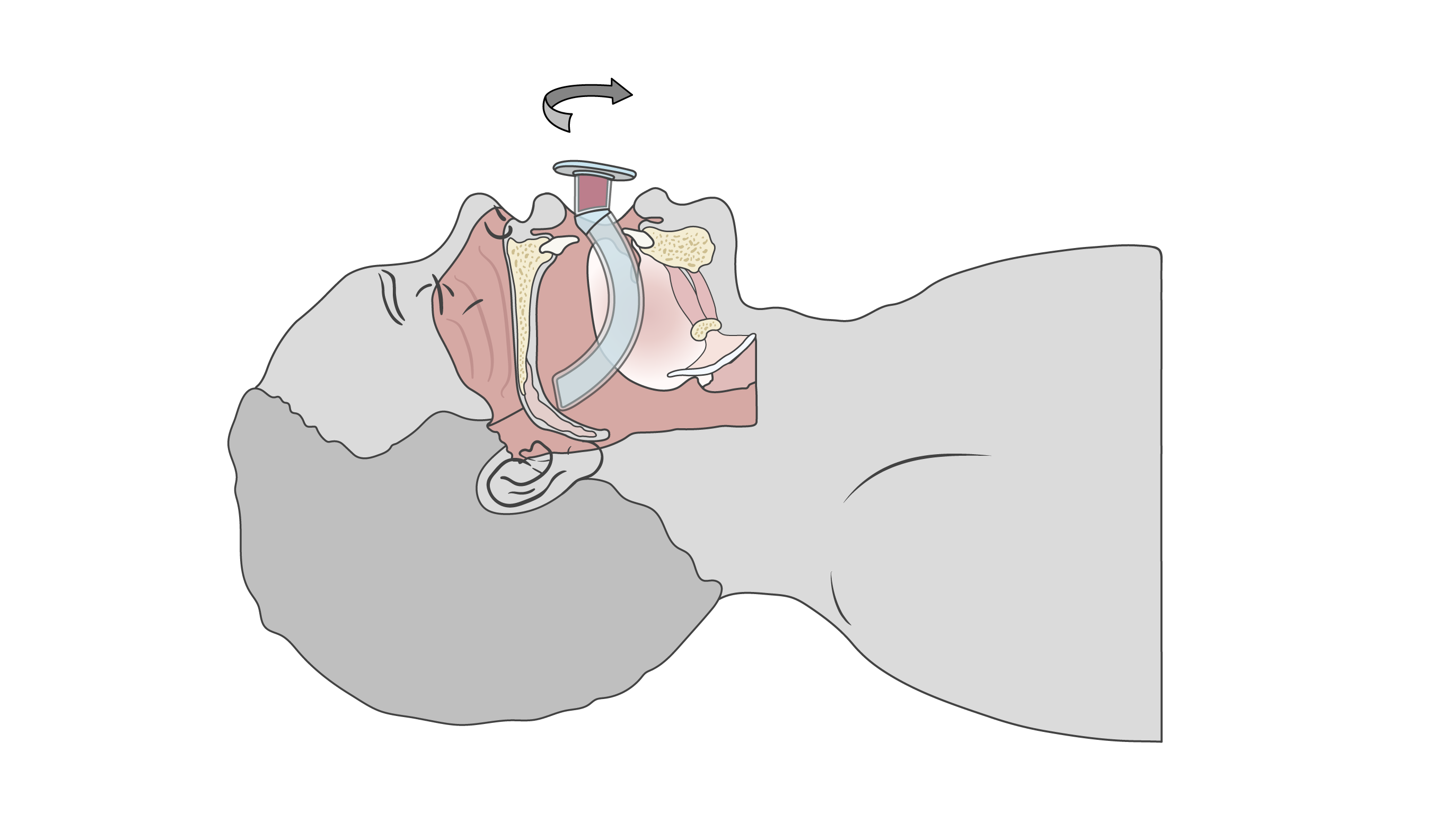
Oral pharyngeal airway (OPA) insertion

The correct size OPA is chosen by measuring from the first incisors to the angle of the jaw. The airway is then inserted into the person's mouth upside down. Once contact is made with the back of the throat, the airway is rotated 180 degrees, allowing for easy insertion, and assuring that the tongue is secured. An alternative method for insertion, the method that is recommended for OPA use in children and infants, involves holding the tongue forward with a tongue depressor and inserting the airway right side up.

The device is removed when the person regains swallow reflex and can protect their own airway, or it is substituted for an advanced airway. It is removed simply by pulling on it without rotation.

== Usage ==
Use of an OPA does not remove the need for the recovery position and ongoing assessment of the airway and it does not prevent obstruction by liquids (blood, saliva, food, cerebrospinal fluid) or the closing of the glottis. It can, however, facilitate ventilation during CPR (cardiopulmonary resuscitation) and for persons with a large tongue.

== Types of oropharyngeal airways ==
Some of the types of oropharyngeal airways include:

- Guedel
- COPA
- Ovassapian
- Williams
- Berman
- Optosafe
- Berman-Split

The most commonly used oropharyngeal airway is the Guedel style. However, the landscape of oropharyngeal airways has expanded to include various designs tailored for specific medical procedures. Among these designs, those developed to facilitate flexible bronchoscopy are notable. Those include the Berman, the Berman-Split, Optosafe, the Ovassapian and Williams airways. The Ovassapian Intubating Airway has two sections of curved walls between its side walls to guide the passage of the fiberoptic endoscope, while its distal lingual half has no posterior wall. The Williams Airway Intubator has a distal half that is open on its lingual surface, in contrast its proximal half consists of a cylindrical tunnel.

Another notable alternative oropharyngeal airawy design is the Cuffed oropharyngeal airways (COPA). It intends to provide a better fit in the oropharynx by adding an inflatable cuff to a Guedel style airway.

== Risks of use ==
The main risks of its use are:

- Airway hyperreactivity including retching, emesis, coughing, laryngospasm, and bronchospasm
- Iatrogenic trauma such as pinching of the lips and tongue, dental trauma. Prolonged insertion can cause tongue necrosis or edema, uvular edema, or lip damage.

== See also ==
- Airway management
- Bag valve mask
- Guedel's classification of stages of anesthesia
- Endotracheal tube
- Laryngeal mask airway
- Nasopharyngeal airway
