= Shivering =

Bodily function in response to cold and extreme fear

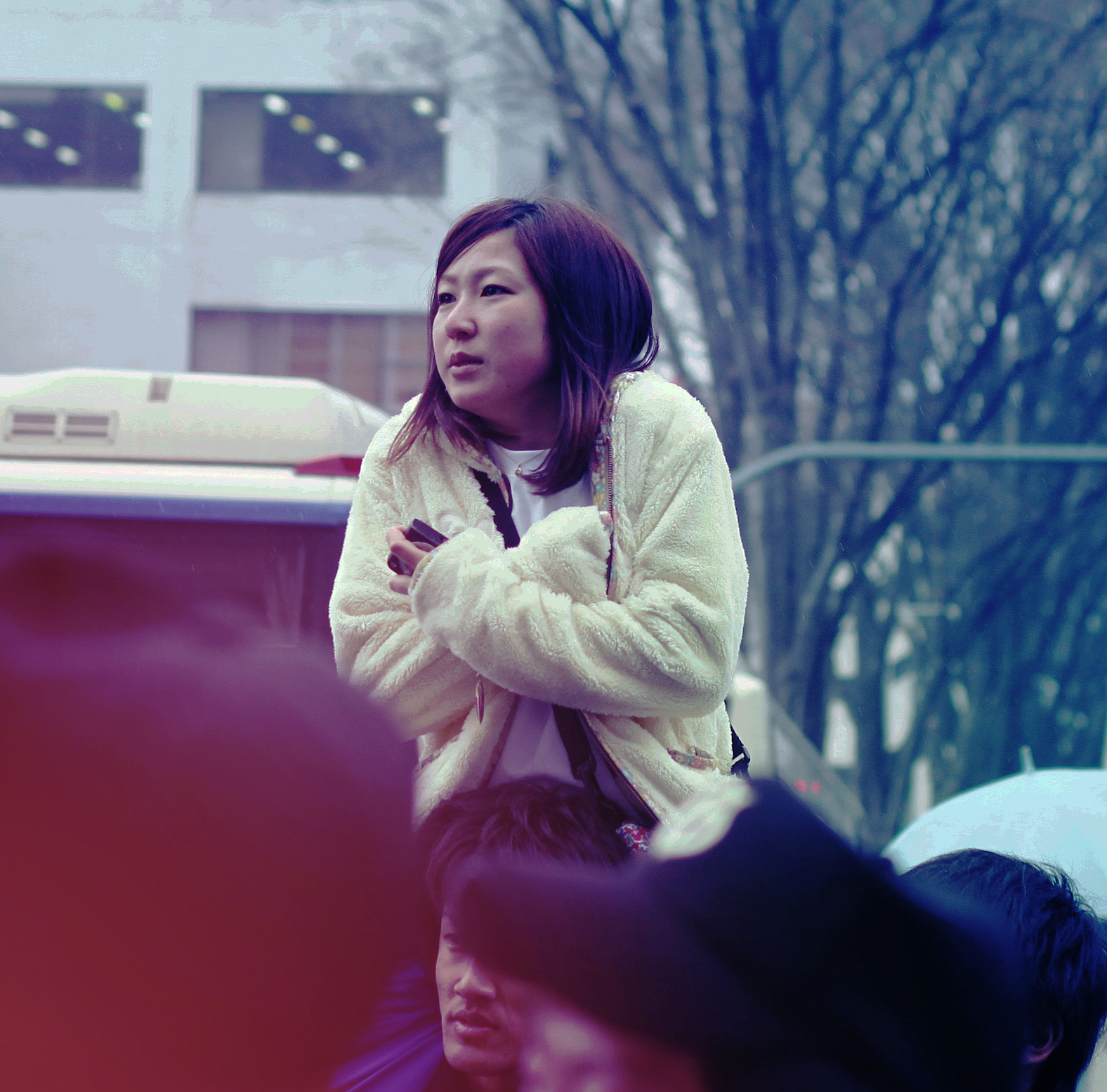
A woman shivering from cold

Shivering (also called shuddering) is a bodily function in response to cold and extreme fear in warm-blooded animals. When the core body temperature drops, the shivering reflex is triggered to maintain homeostasis. Skeletal muscles begin to shake in small movements, creating warmth by expending energy. Shivering can also be a response to fever, as a person may feel cold. During fever, the hypothalamic set point for temperature is raised. The increased set point causes the body temperature to rise (pyrexia), but also makes a person feel cold until the new set point is reached.

== Biological basis ==
Located in the posterior hypothalamus near the wall of the third ventricle is an area called the primary motor center for shivering. This area is normally inhibited by signals from the heat center in the anterior hypothalamic-preoptic area but is excited by cold signals from the skin and spinal cord and becomes activated when the body temperature falls even a fraction of a degree below a critical temperature level. The center then causes rapid contractions of skeletal muscles, producing heat as a byproduct.

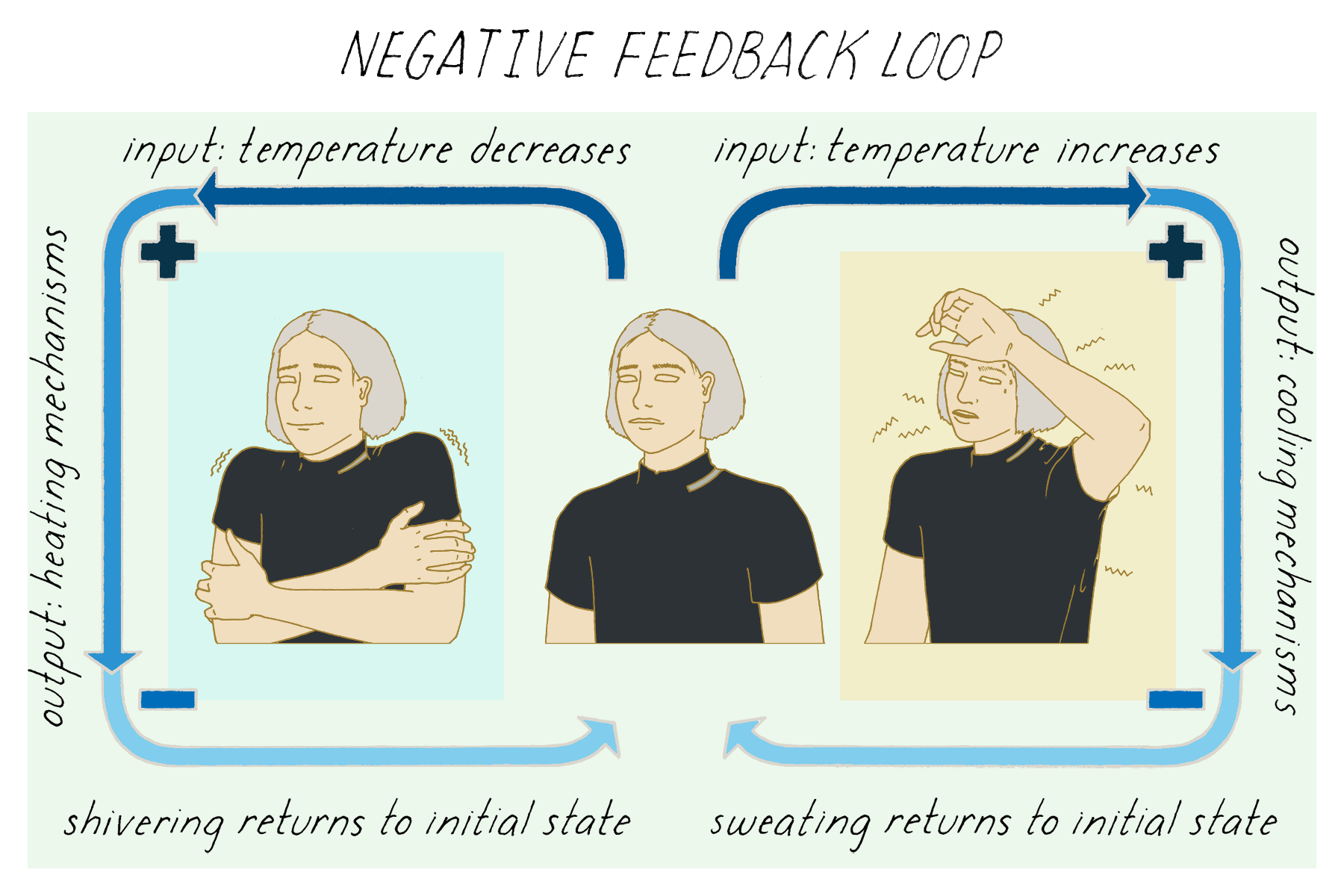
Shivering to generate heat is an example of a negative feedback loop - a process that moves a system closer to the stable level after a deviation from that setpoint has occurred.

Newborn babies, infants, and young children experience a greater (net) heat loss than adults because of a greater surface-area-to-volume ratio. As they cannot shiver to maintain body heat, they rely on non-shivering thermogenesis. Children have an increased amount of brown adipose tissue (increased vascular supply and high mitochondrial density), and, when cold-stressed, will have greater oxygen consumption and will release norepinephrine. Norepinephrine will react with lipases in brown fat to break down fat into triglycerides. Triglycerides are then metabolized to glycerol and non-esterified fatty acids. These are then further degraded in the needed heat-generating process to form CO_{2} and water. Chemically, in mitochondria, the proton gradient producing the proton electromotive force that is ordinarily used to synthesize ATP is instead bypassed to produce heat directly.

Shivering can also appear after surgery. This is known as postanesthetic shivering.

In humans, shivering can also be caused by cognition. This is known as psychogenic shivering.

== Shivering and the elderly ==
The functional capacity of the thermoregulatory system alters with aging, reducing the resistance of elderly people to extreme external temperatures. The shiver response may be greatly diminished or even absent in the elderly, resulting in a significant drop in mean deep body temperature upon exposure to cold. Standard tests of thermoregulatory function show a markedly different rate of decline of thermoregulatory processes in different individuals with aging.

== See also ==
- Goose bumps
- Myoclonus
- Post-micturition convulsion syndrome
- Chattering teeth
- Tremor
