= John William Turner =

Scottish physician

John William Turner MD FRSE (1790–19 November 1835) was a 19th-century Scottish medical doctor who served as Professor of Surgery at the University of Edinburgh.

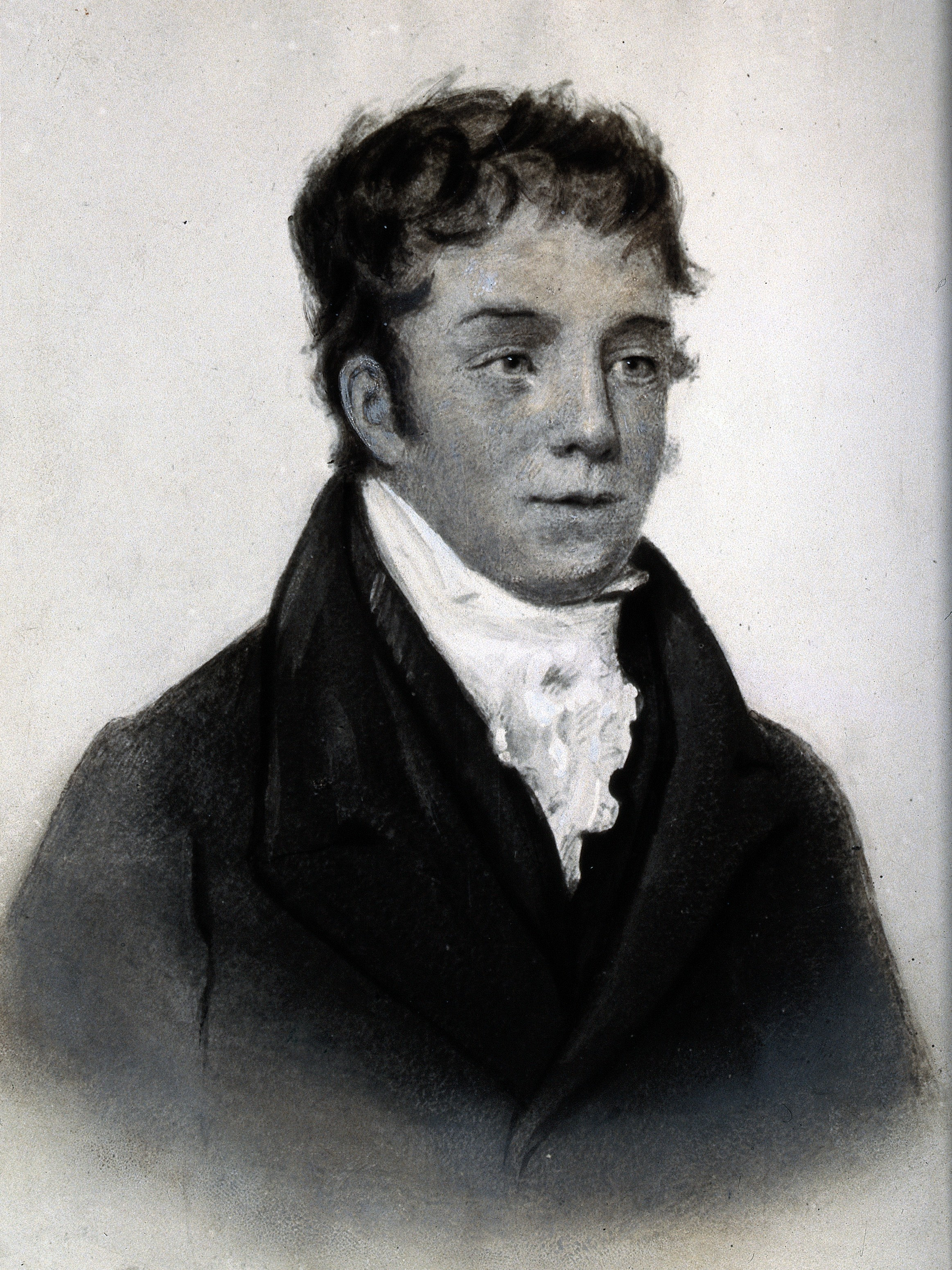
Portrait. Credit: Wellcome Collection

== Life ==
He was born in England in 1790. His family moved to Newbattle south of Edinburgh around 1795.

From around 1805 he studied Surgery under Professor James Russell and received his doctorate from the University of Edinburgh in 1809, aged 19. He then became Assistant to Professor John Thomson, newly appointed as Professor of Military Surgery at the university.

In 1816, he took over the running of the New Town Dispensary. In 1820 he was living at 14 George Street in central Edinburgh.

In 1821, he was appointed Professor of Surgery at the University of Edinburgh. He was elected a Fellow of the Royal Society of Edinburgh in 1833. His proposers were Sir Thomas Dick Lauder, and Sir J T Gibson Craig.

Although referred to little, Turner taught surgery through Edinburgh's golden age. His pupils included future major names in British surgery such as Samuel Alexander Pagan, Andrew Wood, Robert Omond, Andrew Douglas Maclagan and Patrick Newbigging.

He was Surgeon to Edinburgh Royal Infirmary from 1829, but continued as Professor of Surgery until 1831.

From 1831 to 1833 he went to Paris to improve his health, where he acted as a private physician to Henry, Lord Holland.

His final Edinburgh address was 23 Castle Street in the New Town just off Princes Street.

On the evening of 25/26 October 1835, he was called out during a heavy storm to tend to a patient at Edinburgh Royal Infirmary on Drummond Street. He caught a severe cold and abandoned teaching on 12 November. The cold then developed into pneumonia.

He died on 19 November 1835, aged 45. He is buried at Newbattle Churchyard in Midlothian, where his family had a country mansion. His position at the university was filled by Sir Charles Bell.

== Publications ==
- Dislocations of the Shoulder Joint (1812)
- Observations on the Causes of the Sounds Produced by the Action of the Heart (1829)

.
