= Chattering teeth =

Bodily function in animals that occurs primarily in response to cold

Chattering teeth is a bodily function in animals that occurs primarily in response to cold; the jaw muscles begin to shiver leading teeth to crash together. It may also occur as a result of bruxism where emotional stress causes the jaw movements. Certain medications can lead to teeth chattering as a side effect, especially antipsychotics and selective serotonin reuptake inhibitors.
