= Samuel Alexander Pagan =

Scottish surgeon and obstetrician

Dr Samuel Pagan

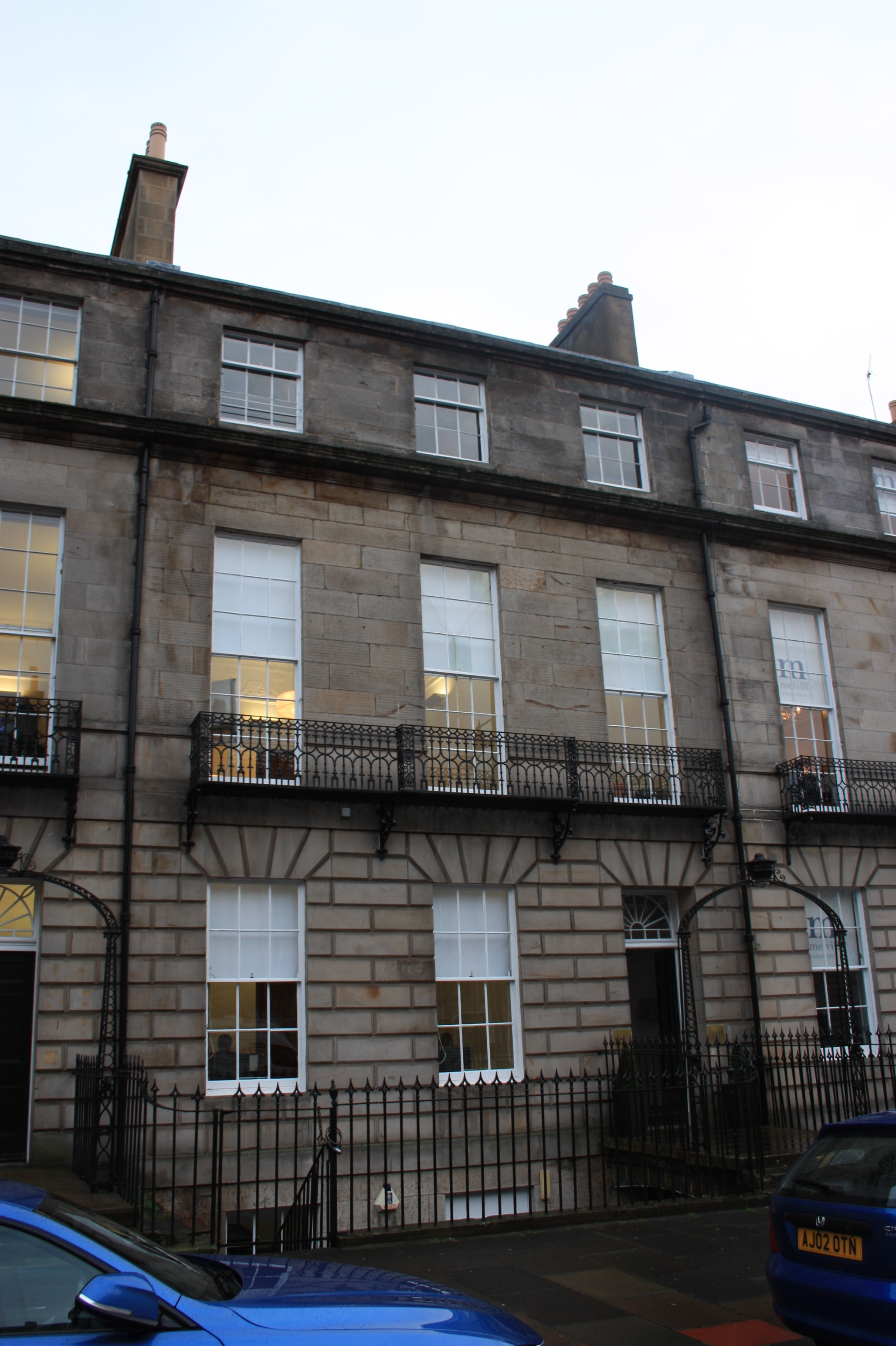
8 Melville Street, Edinburgh

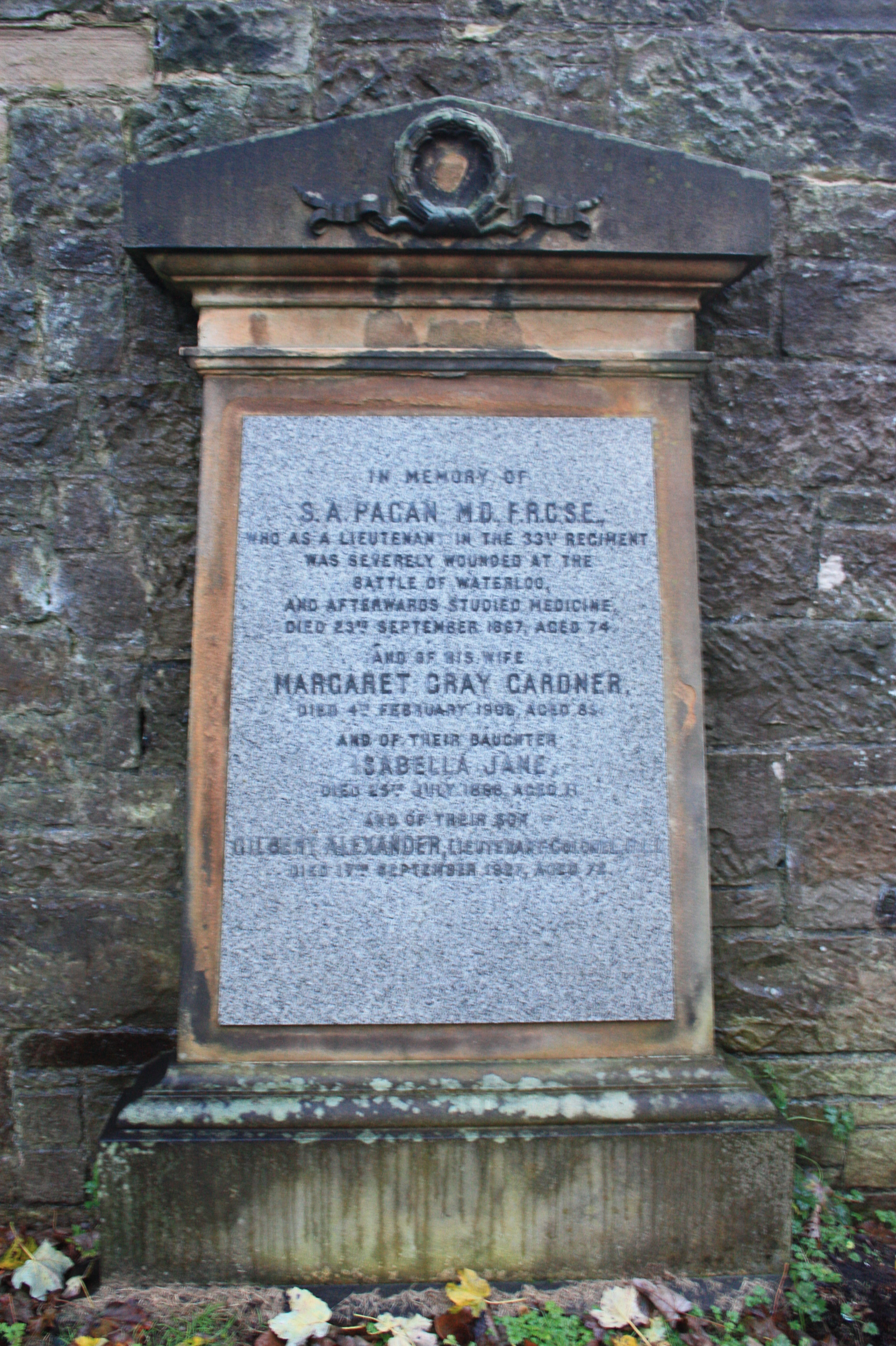
The grave of Dr Pagan, Dean Cemetery, Edinburgh

Samuel Alexander Pagan MD FRSE FRCSEd (1793–1867) was a 19th-century Scottish surgeon and obstetrician. He served as president of the Royal College of Surgeons of Edinburgh from 1846 to 1848 and president of the Harveian Society in 1849.

== Life ==
He was born on 22 February 1793 the son of William Pagan. The family moved to Edinburgh around 1800, to live at 13 York Place in the New Town He originally trained as a soldier beginning as an ensign in 1811 and rising to lieutenant. In 1815 he was wounded at the Battle of Waterloo.

He left the army in 1822 and then studied medicine at the University of Edinburgh where his teachers included Professor John William Turner, the professor of surgery. He qualified MD in 1824. He worked variously at the New Town Dispensary, Edinburgh Royal Infirmary (then on Drummond Street) and the Royal Lunatic Asylum in south Edinburgh.

In the 1820s, he is listed as a surgeon living at 16 Maitland Street in Edinburgh's West End.

In 1832 he was elected a member of the Aesculapian Club. In 1832 Pagan was also elected a member of the Harveian Society of Edinburgh and served as president in 1849. In 1846 he was elected a Fellow of the Royal Society of Edinburgh, his proposer being David Maclagan.

He temporarily removed to London being a member of the Camden Society in 1862.

He died at home, 8 Melville Street in Edinburgh's West End on 25 September 1867. He is buried in Dean Cemetery in western Edinburgh. The grave lies at the east end of the concealed southern terrace. The parents of his second wife lie adjacent.

== Family ==
He was married to Elizabeth Miller Mckenzie (1800–1837) daughter of Dr John MacKenzie (1754–1837). Their children included George Mckenzie Pagan (1827–1841). Elizabeth died in childbirth and is buried with her parents in New Calton Burial Ground.

After Elizabeth's death Samuel married Margaret Gray Gardner (1823–1908), 30 years his junior, and daughter of Dr Gilbert Ogilvie Gardner. Their children included Lt Col Gilbert Alexander Pagan (1855–1927).
