= Blowpipe =

Blowpipe may refer to:

- Blowpipe (missile), a man-portable surface-to-air missile
- Blowgun (also called a blowpipe or blow tube) is a simple weapon in which a missile, such as a dart, is blown through a pipe
- Blowpipe (tool), used to direct streams of gases into any of several working media
- Blowpipe (Transformers), several Transformers characters
