= Sympathicolysis =

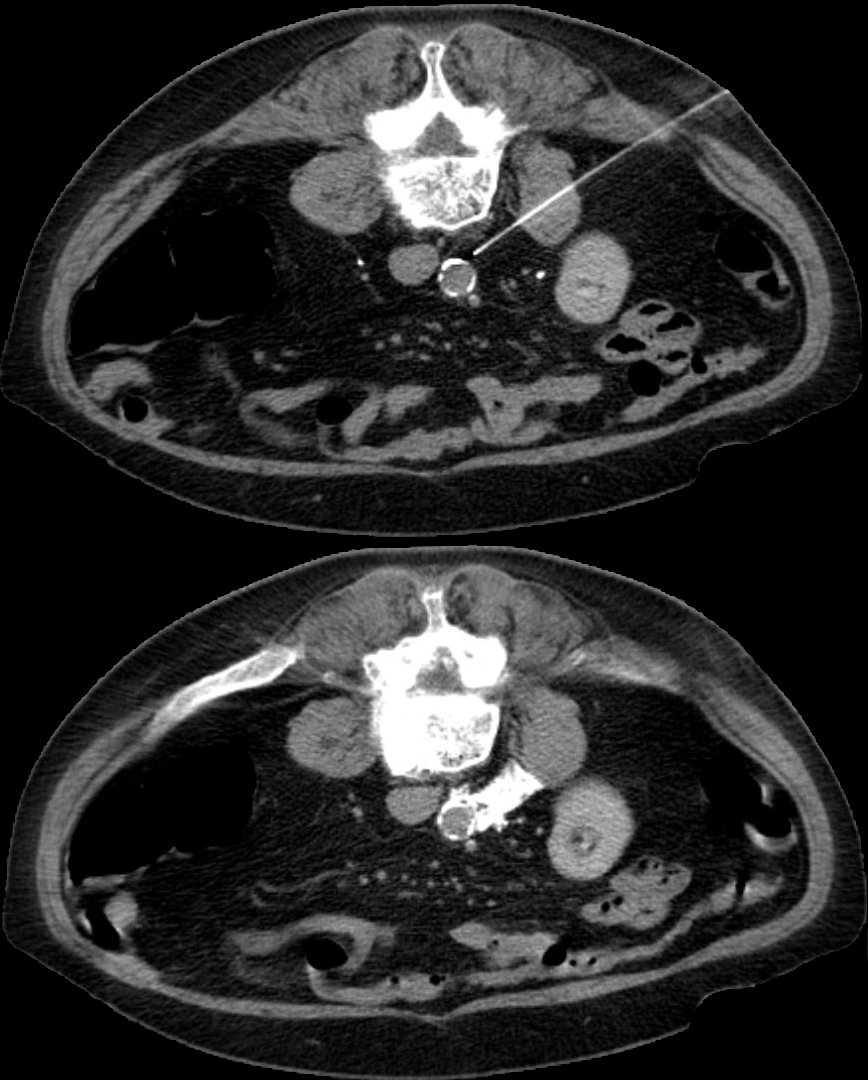
Sympathectomy under CT guidance. The patient lies on his stomach. In the first picture the injection needle is visible with its tip behind the aorta. The second image shows the distribution contrast with lysis bolus.

Sympathicolysis is a procedure for temporary or long-term elimination of sympathetic innervation. It is used to improve blood circulation in the legs or arms. The sympathetic nervous system causes the balance of the autonomic system to lean towards narrowing of blood vessels, with elimination of its function resulting in vasodilatation. Completely blocked arteries are not opened again, but the collaterals are better supplied with blood.

To improve the blood circulation to the upper extremities, an anesthetic block of the stellate ganglion is performed. Due to this blockage, in addition to vasodilatation, in the entire innervation area this leads to reduced sweating (anhidrosis) and Horner's syndrome. The latter is a sign of successful blockade. A temporary blockade of the stellate ganglion is performed for e.g. the treatment of advanced complex regional pain syndrome. Surgical elimination of the stellate ganglion (sympathectomy) is a treatment of last resort for Raynaud's disease.

The sympathetic plexus can also be blocked in other parts of the body. Lying on the major abdominal vessels sympathetic plexus may, for example, under local anesthesia guided by a CT scan it can be turned off by injection of concentrated alcohol (interventional radiology).

== Procedure ==
In CT guided lumbar sympathicolysis, the site of neurolytic solution injection is chosen at the level of L2-L3 vertebra level. The needle should avoid the vertebral transverse process, ureter, pelvicalyceal system, and other major blood vessels. The target injection site would be anteromedial to the psoas muscle and dorsolateral to the abdominal aorta, where the sympathetic trunk would most likely be located.

After the skin of the puncture site is cleaned, 2% lignocaine is injected into the to numb the skin and also the needle trajectory. Then a 22G China needle is inserted into the target site, which is bounded by the vertebral body, aorta, inferior vena cava, and psoas muscle. This region houses the lumbar sympathetic ganglion. Then, iodinated contrast medium (iohexol) and lignociane is injected into the target site to check the position of the needle tip. Once the needle tip position is confirmed, a mixture of neurolytic solution (99.9% alcohol) and iodinated contrast medium (at a ratio of 10:1) is injected into the target site.
