= Arthur Ernest Guedel =

American anesthesiologist

- Born: June 13, 1883; Cambridge City, Indiana, U.S.
- Died: June 10, 1956 (aged 72); Los Angeles, California, U.S.
- Education: School of Medicine of Purdue University–Indianapolis
- Spouse: Florence Fulton
- Children: 2
- Scientific career
- Fields: anaesthetist

Arthur Ernest Guedel (June 13, 1883 – June 10, 1956) was an American anesthesiologist. He was known for his studies on the uptake and distribution of inhalational anesthetics, as well for defining the various stages of general anesthesia. The Guedel pattern oropharyngeal airway is named after him.

== Early life and education ==
Arthur Ernest Guedel was born on June 13, 1883, in Cambridge City, Indiana, to Jahn and Mary Guedel. During his teens, he had an accident at work that amputated three fingers from his right hand. His family was unable to afford high school, so he taught himself and was admitted to the School of Medicine of Purdue University–Indianapolis (which merged to form Indiana University School of Medicine). He graduated in 1908 with first honors and began his internship at Indianapolis City Hospital.

== World War I ==
Guedel served as First Lieutenant (and later Captain) in the U.S. Army from 1917 to 1919. During his time, he worked at the American Expeditionary Forces hospitals in Chaumont and Vittels, France. Guedel was responsible for overseeing up to six hospitals at one time. For this reason, he became known as the "motorcycle anesthetist" because he would travel to the various hospitals by motorcycle. Guedel taught various medical personnel, from nurses to orderlies, how to manage anesthesia. Because of this, he defined the stages of anesthesia, now known as Guedel's classification.

== Dunked dog experiment ==
In the 1920s, Guedel began experimenting with how to make a cuffed endotracheal airway. He corresponded greatly with his colleague and friend, Dr Ralph M. Waters about inventing a cuffed endotracheal tube. In 1928, Guedel and Waters did the "dunked dog experiment" on Guedel's family dog. In the experiment, the dog was sedated and intubated using Guedel's cuffed airway. To show how well the cuffed airway worked, the dog was dunked underwater for one hour. Following this, the dog was taken out of the tank and took a nap on the floor. The dog later lived with Waters and his family in Wisconsin.

== Personal life ==
Guedel married Florence Fulton in 1909. They had two children: Marian (b. 1912) and Gretchen (1915–1940). Guedel died in California in 1956 at the age of 72.

== See also ==
- Guedel's classification
- Oropharyngeal airway
