= Postanesthetic shivering =

Shivering after anesthesia

- Specialty: Anesthesia

Postanesthetic shivering (PAS) is shivering after anesthesia. Postanesthetic shivering is one of the leading causes of discomfort in patients recovering from general anesthesia. It usually results due to the anesthetic inhibiting the body's thermoregulatory capability, although cutaneous vasodilation (triggered by post-operative pain) may also be a causative factor.

First-line treatment consists of warming the patient; more persistent/severe cases may be treated with medications such as tramadol, pethidine, clonidine, and nefopam, which work by reducing the shivering threshold temperature and reducing the patient's level of discomfort. As these medications may react and/or synergize with the anesthetic agents employed during the surgery, their use is generally avoided when possible. The anesthetic ketamine can also be used to manage postanesthetic shivering.

== Grading ==
The intensity of PAS may be graded using the scale described by Crossley and Mahajan:

0 = no shivering;
1 = no visible muscle activity but piloerection, peripheral vasoconstriction, or both are present (other causes excluded);
2 = muscular activity in only one muscle group;
3 = moderate muscular activity in more than one muscle group but no generalized shaking;
4 = violent muscular activity that involves the whole body.
