= Bair Hugger =

Convective temperature management system

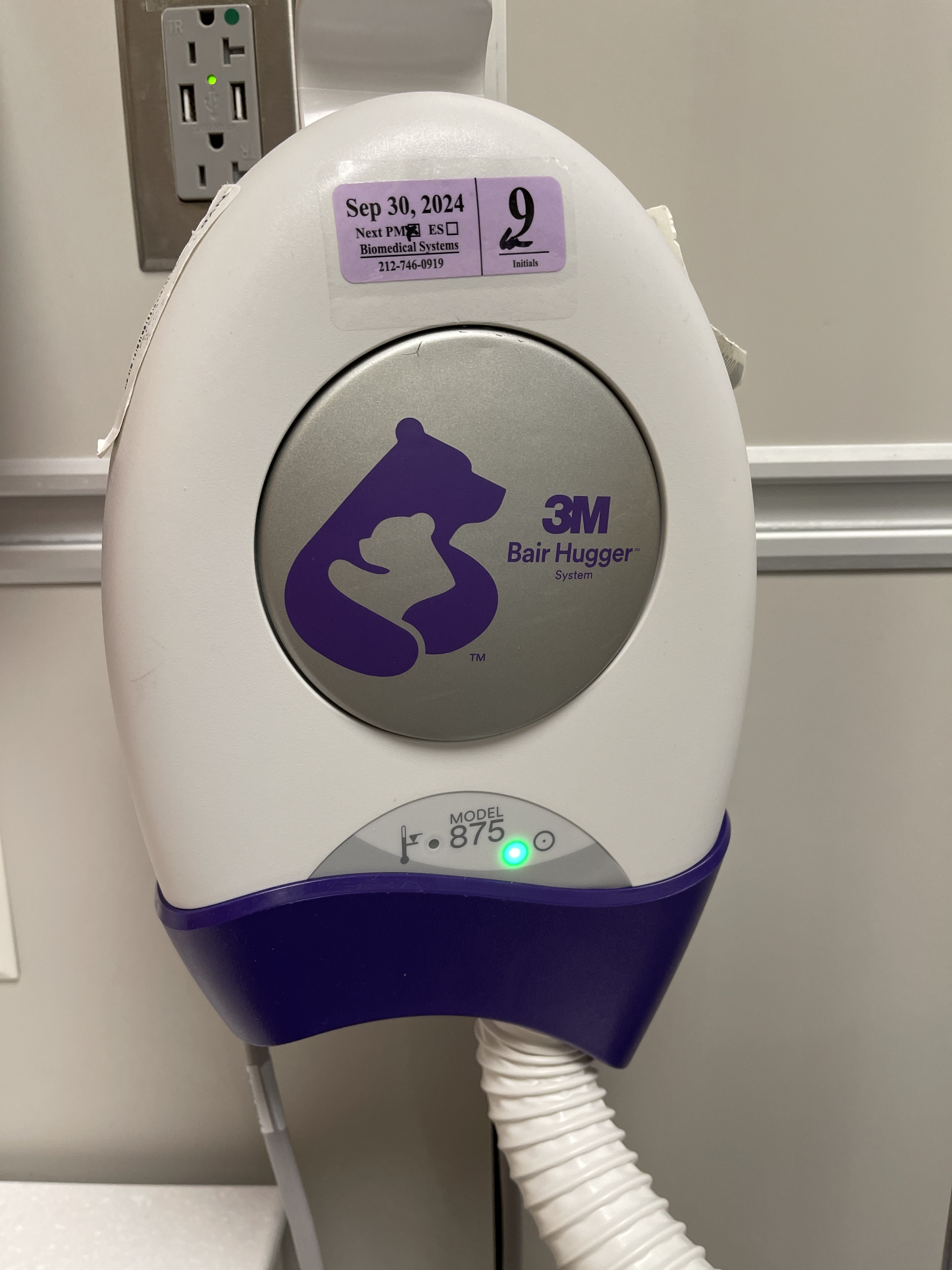
Bair Hugger Model 875

The Bair Hugger system is a convective temperature management system used in a hospital or surgery center to maintain a patient's core body temperature. The Bair Hugger system consists of a reusable warming unit and single-use disposable warming blankets for use before, during, and after surgery. This medical device launched in 1987 and is currently manufactured by the 3M Company.

== Function ==
The Bair Hugger system uses convective warming, also known as forced-air warming, to prevent and treat perioperative hypothermia.

The system includes two primary components: a warming unit and a disposable blanket. The warming unit is connected by a flexible hose to the single-use blanket. Warm air from the warming unit passes through the flexible hose and into the blanket. Once the warmed air reaches the blanket it exits through a series of micro-perforations on the underside of the blanket, warming the patient's skin in an area not involved in the surgical procedure.

== Performance ==
The Bair Hugger system warms effectively due to the properties of convection and radiation; heat transfer improves with the movement of warmed air across the surface of the patient's skin. Up to 64 percent of the patient's body surface may be recruited for heat transfer, depending on which Bair Hugger blanket is used.

== History ==
The Bair Hugger system was originally designed by Scott Augustine, MD of Minnesota. The Bair Hugger was produced by Arizant, previously known as Augustine Medicine. Augustine resigned from Arizant in 2002, and Arizant was bought by 3M in 2009. Augustine later invented a different type of patient-warming device and formed a separate company to sell his competing device.

The Bair Hugger system received FDA clearance in 1987.

== External sources ==
- http://www.bairhugger.com
