= Guedel's classification =

Means of addressing depth of general anesthesia

- Purpose: assess depth of general anesthisia

Guedel's classification is a means of assessing the depth of general anesthesia introduced by Arthur Ernest Guedel (1883–1956) in 1920.

== History ==
Since general anesthesia first became widely used in late 1846, assessment of anesthetic depth was a problem. To determine the depth of anesthesia, the anesthetist relies on a series of physical signs of the patient. In 1847, John Snow (1813–1858) and Francis Plomley attempted to describe various stages of general anesthesia, but Guedel in 1937 described a detailed system which was generally accepted.

This classification was designed for use of a sole inhalational anesthetic agent, diethyl ether (commonly referred to as simply "ether"), in patients who were usually premedicated with morphine and atropine. At that time, intravenous anesthetic agents were not yet in common use, and neuromuscular-blocking drugs were not used at all during general anesthesia. The introduction of neuromuscular blocking agents (such as succinylcholine and tubocurarine) changed the concept of general anesthesia as it could produce temporary paralysis (a desired feature for surgery) without deep anesthesia. Most of the signs of Guedel's classification depend upon the muscular movements (including respiratory muscles), and paralyzed patients' traditional clinical signs were no longer detectable when such drugs were used. Since 1982, ether is not used in the United States. Now, because of the use of intravenous induction agents with muscle relaxants and the discontinuation of ether, elements of Guedel's classification have been superseded by depth of anaesthesia monitoring devices such as the BIS monitor; however, the use of BIS monitoring remains controversial.

== Stages of Anesthesia ==
Stage I (stage of analgesia or disorientation): from beginning of induction of general anesthesia to loss of consciousness.

Stage II (stage of excitement or delirium): from loss of consciousness to onset of automatic breathing. Eyelash reflex disappears but other reflexes remain intact and coughing, vomiting and struggling may occur; respiration can be irregular with breath-holding.

Stage III (stage of surgical anesthesia): from onset of automatic respiration to respiratory paralysis. It is divided into four planes:

- Plane I - from onset of automatic respiration to cessation of eyeball movements. Eyelid reflex is lost, swallowing reflex disappears, marked eyeball movement may occur but conjunctival reflex is lost at the bottom of the plane
- Plane II - from cessation of eyeball movements to beginning of paralysis of intercostal muscles. Laryngeal reflex is lost although inflammation of the upper respiratory tract increases reflex irritability, corneal reflex disappears, secretion of tears increases (a useful sign of light anesthesia), respiration is automatic and regular, movement and deep breathing as a response to skin stimulation disappears.
- Plane III - from beginning to completion of intercostal muscle paralysis. Diaphragmatic respiration persists but there is progressive intercostal paralysis, pupils dilated and light reflex is abolished. The laryngeal reflex lost in plane II can still be initiated by painful stimuli arising from the dilatation of anus or cervix. This was the desired plane for surgery when muscle relaxants were not used.
- Plane IV - from complete intercostal paralysis to diaphragmatic paralysis (apnea).

Stage IV: from stoppage of respiration till death. Anesthetic overdose-caused medullary paralysis with respiratory arrest and vasomotor collapse. Pupils are widely dilated and muscles are relaxed.

In 1954, Joseph F. Artusio further divided the first stage in Guedel's classification into three planes.

- 1st plane The patient does not experience amnesia or analgesia
- 2nd plane The patient is completely amnesic but experiences only partial analgesia
- 3rd plane The patient has complete analgesia and amnesia

== See also ==
- Oropharyngeal airway
- Anesthetic agents
- Instruments used in anesthesiology
- Anesthesia machine
- Inhalational anesthetic
