= Bell's phenomenon =

Reflex of the eye

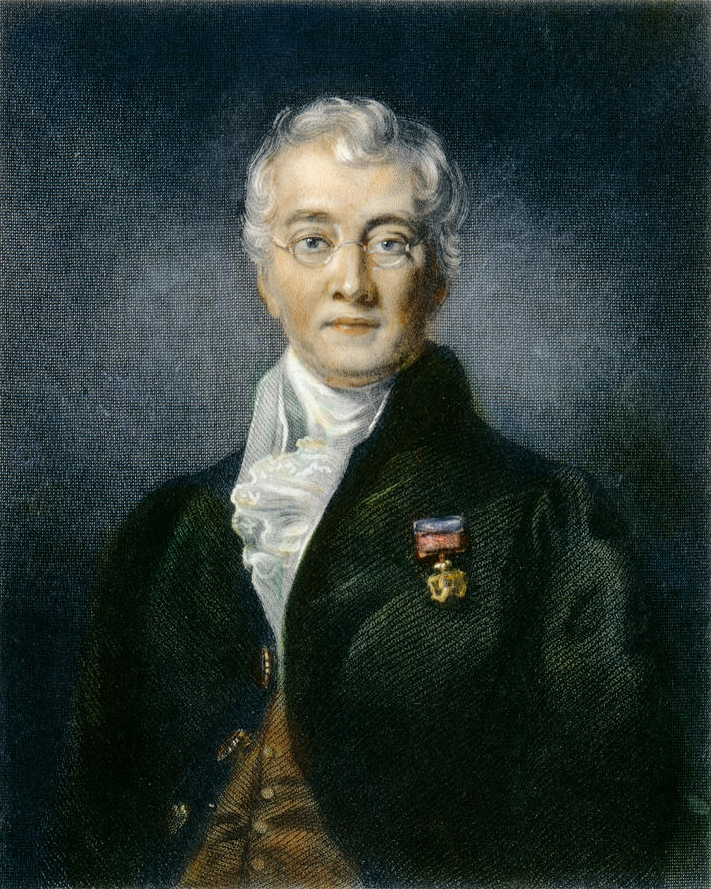
Sir Charles Bell

Bell's phenomenon (also known as the palpebral oculogyric reflex) is a medical sign that allows observers to notice an upward and outward movement of the eye, when an attempt is made to close the eyes. The upward movement of the eye is present in the majority of the population, and is a defensive mechanism. The phenomenon is named after the Scottish anatomist, surgeon, and physiologist Charles Bell. Bell's phenomenon is a normal defense reflex present in about 75% of the population, resulting in elevation of the globes when blinking or when threatened (e.g. when an attempt is made to touch a patient's cornea). It becomes noticeable only when the orbicularis oculi muscle becomes weak as in, for example, bilateral facial palsy associated with Guillain–Barré syndrome. It is, however, present behind forcibly closed eyelids in most healthy people and should not be regarded as a pathognomonic sign.

Also, traumatic abrasions are generally located in the central or inferior cornea due to Bell's phenomenon.

Bell's phenomenon does not occur during short blinks.
