= Grażyna Stachówna =

Film historian and theorist

- Education: Jagiellonian University
- Occupations: Film historian and theorist
- Employer: Jagiellonian University

Grażyna Stachówna is a film historian and theorist who was professor at the Jagiellonian University.

== Biography ==
In 1974 she graduated in film studies from the Jagiellonian University. In 1983 he obtained doctorate in the humanities at the Jagiellonian University. In 1994 she obtained habilitation. From 1974 to 2020 she taught at the Jagiellonian University. She supervised six doctoral dissertations, including the one of Olga Katafiasz in 2004.

She researched the history of cinema and popular culture. She taught courses on the history of world cinema, film analysis, and film adaptations of literary works, and led master’s and doctoral seminars. She also served as the faculty supervisor for the Student Film Studies Research Group (Polish: Studenckie Koło Naukowe Filmoznawców).

== Books ==
- Roman Polański i jego filmy. Warszawa. 1994.
- Roman Polański od A do Z. Kraków. 2002.
- 100 melodramatów. Kraków. 2000.
- Niedole miłowania. Ideologia i perswazja w melodramatach filmowych. Kraków. 2001.
- Władcy wyobraźni. Sławni bohaterowie filmowi. Kraków. 2006.

=== Edited books ===
- Autorzy kina europejskiego. Kraków. 2003. Co-edited with Joanna Wojnicka.
- Autorzy kina polskiego. Kraków. 2004. Co-edited with Joanna Wojnicka.
- Autorzy kina polskiego. Vol. 2. Kraków. 2007. Co-edited with Bogusław Zmudziński.
- Autorzy kina polskiego. Vol. 3. Kraków. 2007. Co-edited with Bogusław Zmudziński.
- Nie tylko Bollywood. Kraków. 2009. Co-edited with Przemysław Piekarski.
- Bollywood – prawdy i mity. Wrocław: „Studia Filmoznawcze". 2011.
- Od Ramajany do Slumdoga. Filmowe adaptacje literatury indyjskiej. Kraków. 2015. Co-edited with Tatiana Szurlej.

Source.
