= Bogusław Zmudziński =

Polish film critic and academic (1951–2026)

- Born: 7 May 1951; Opole, Poland
- Died: 4 July 2026 (aged 75)
- Education: Jagiellonian University
- Occupations: Film critic Academic

Bogusław Zmudziński (7 May 1951 – 4 July 2026) was a Polish film critic and academic.

A graduate of Jagiellonian University, he was a professor at the AGH University of Kraków and wrote many publications underground following the declaration of martial law.

Zmudziński died on 4 July 2026, at the age of 75.
