= Caudal anaesthesia =

Form of neuraxial regional anaesthesia

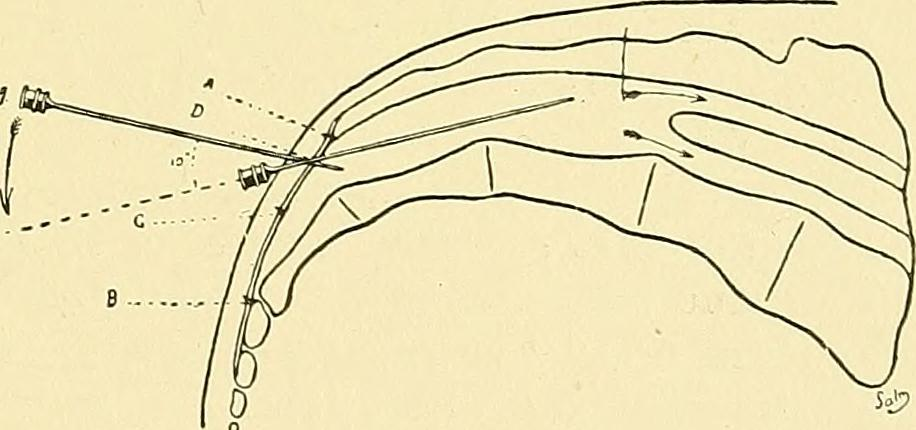
- Canal block showing needle puncture over sacral area with the patient in the lateral position

Caudal anaesthesia (or caudal anesthesia) is a form of neuraxial regional anaesthesia conducted by accessing the epidural space via the sacral hiatus. It is typically used in paediatrics to provide peri- and post-operative analgesia for surgeries below the umbilicus. In adults, it can be used in the context of anorectal surgery or for chronic low back pain management.

It can be used as an alternative to general anaesthesia or as adjunct to it.

== Indications ==
Caudal anaesthesia is a relatively low-risk technique commonly used, either on its own or in combination with sedation or general anaesthesia.

Caudal anesthesia may be favored for sub-umbilical region surgeries in the pediatric population, such as inguinal hernia repair, circumcision, hypospadias repair, anal atresia, or to immobilise newborns with hip dysplasia. Success rate is limited when used for mid-abdominal interventions such as umbilical hernia repair. This is due to the unpredictable cephalad spread of the local anesthetics.

It may also be used in patients with lumbar spinal stenosis, lumbar spinal radiculopathy, postlaminectomy pain, or nonspecific chronic low back pain that fail conservative treatment.

List of indications:

- Obstetrics and general surgery below the umbilicus
- Acute and chronic pain refractory to conservative management
- Patients with previous lumbar spine surgery
- Patients who are "anticoagulated" or have coagulopathy

== Contraindications ==
Contraindications to caudal anesthesia include patient or guardian refusal, localized infection over the sacral area such as pilonidal disease, severe coagulopathy and elevated intracranial pressure. It should also be avoided in case of allergies to local anesthetics to be used for the procedure.

== Risks and complications ==
Serious complications are infrequent. When they occur, they are similar those encountered with lumbar epidural block. Some of the risks associated with caudal anesthesia include:

- Needle misplacement leading to subdural, intravascular, intraosseous or antesacral injection with rectum perforation
- Infection, such as epidural abscess, meningitis or sacral osteomyelitis
- Low blood pressure
- Injury to the nerve roots
- Epidural hematoma
- Local anesthetic toxicity, more frequently following caudal anesthesia than it does following lumbar or thoracic blocks.

The most common complications of the anatomic technique for caudal block include: needle misplacement, subarachnoid puncture, and intrathecal or intravascular injections.

== Technique ==
A caudal block may be performed by using anatomic landmarks to guide needle insertion. However, greatest accuracy is obtained by performing caudal blocks using imaging guidance, such as ultrasound or fluoroscopy. Common local anesthetic drugs for caudal blockade are bupivacaine and ropivacaine. Opioids, ketamine or opioids are common drug added as they prolong the postoperative analgesia while minimizing the motor block.

== History ==
Caudal anesthesia was first described independently in 1901 by Fernand Cathelin and Jean-Athanase Sicard. It predates the lumbar epidural approach which was described by Fidel Pagés Miravé in 1921. However, the high failure rate found in caudal anesthesia (5–10%) limited its popularity until the 1940s when it resurfaced in obstetrics anaesthesia. The first publication to describe caudal anaesthesia in children was published by Meredith Campbell in 1933.

== See also ==
- Combined spinal and epidural anaesthesia
- Epidural
- Intrathecal administration
- Lumbar puncture
- Spinal anaesthesia
