= Epidural (disambiguation) =

The term epidural (from Ancient Greek ἐπί, "on, upon" + dura mater) is an adjective referring to the epidural space, part of the spinal canal in mammals. The term is most commonly used to refer to epidural administration of analgesics and anesthetics.

It may also refer to:

== Anatomy ==
- Epidural administration
- Epidural space
- Epidural venous plexus

== Anaesthesia ==
- Epidural needle (Tuohy needle)
- Epidural blood patch
- Caudal epidural
- Combined spinal and epidural anaesthesia (CSE)
- Epidural steroid injection
- Patient-controlled epidural analgesia (PCEA)

== Pathology ==
- Epidural abscess
- Epidural haematoma
