= James Leonard Corning =

American physician

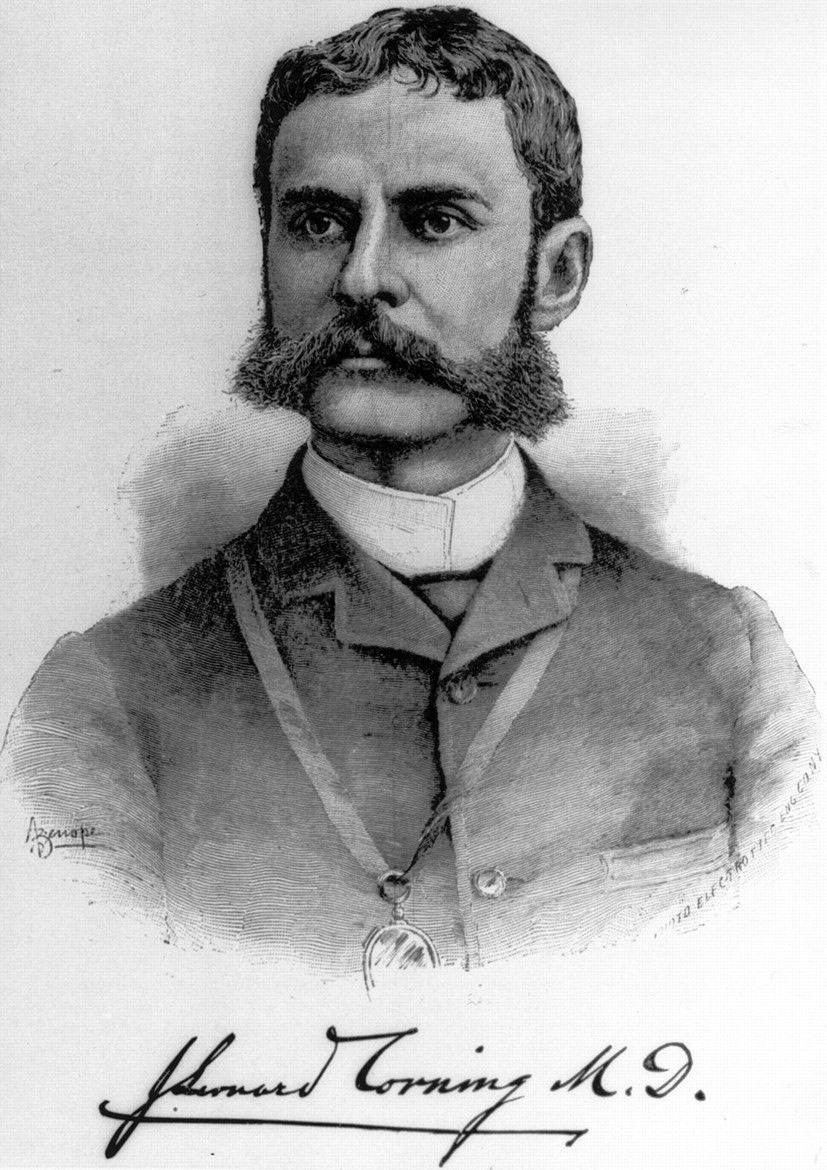
- James Leonard Corning, American neurologist
- Born: 1855; Stamford, Connecticut, United States
- Died: 1923 (aged 67–68)
- Known for: first demonstration of neuraxial blockade
- Scientific career
- Fields: neurology

James Leonard Corning (1855 – 1923) was an American neurologist, mainly known for his early experiments on neuraxial blockade in New York City.

== Education ==
Corning was born in Stamford, Connecticut. When the American Civil War began in 1861, Corning's family moved to Stuttgart, Germany. Corning studied chemistry at the Stuttgart Polytechnic Institute under Hermann von Fehling. He later studied physiology at Heidelberg University under Wilhelm Kühne, and pathology at the University of Würzburg. After receiving his medical degree in 1878, he left Germany and visited Vienna, Paris, and London before finally returning to the United States.

== Neuraxial blockade ==
In 1884, Karl Koller became the first to describe the anesthetic properties of cocaine. The following year, Corning injected cocaine between the spinous processes of the lower lumbar vertebrae, first in a dog and then in a healthy man. His experiments are the first published descriptions of the principle of neuraxial blockade.

== Controversy ==
On August 16, 1898, German surgeon August Bier (1861–1949) performed surgery under spinal anesthesia in Kiel. Following the publication of Bier's experiments in 1899, a controversy developed about whether Bier or Corning performed the first successful spinal anesthetic.

There is no doubt that Corning's experiments preceded those of Bier. The controversy centers around whether Corning's injection was a spinal or an epidural block. The dose of cocaine used by Corning was eight times higher than that used by Bier and Tuffier. Despite this much higher dose, the onset of analgesia in Corning's human subject was slower, and the dermatomal level of ablation of sensation was lower. Also, Corning did not describe seeing the flow of cerebrospinal fluid in his reports, whereas both Bier and Tuffier did make these observations. Based on Corning's own description of his experiments, it is apparent that his injections were made into the epidural space and not the subarachnoid space. Finally, Corning was incorrect in his theory on the mechanism of action of cocaine on the spinal nerves and spinal cord. He proposed – mistakenly – that the cocaine was absorbed into the venous circulation and subsequently transported to the spinal cord.

Although Bier properly deserves credit for introducing spinal anesthesia into the clinical practice of medicine, it was Corning who created the experimental conditions that ultimately led to the development of both spinal and epidural anesthesia.

He published one of the first books on local anesthesia and the first textbook on pain.

== Other work ==
During his career, Corning published at least forty articles and five books on topics relating to neurology and psychiatry. He studied the theory that epileptic seizures were the result of increased blood flow to the brain. He proposed that reducing the cerebral blood flow would reduce the frequency and duration of seizure activity. To this end, he developed several instruments for the compression of the jugular vein. One of these devices was a fork-like compression tool for immediate treatment of seizures, and another was an adjustable belt-like instrument, widely used for preventing seizures. He later developed this approach in combination with other methods for reduction of cerebral blood flow, such as transcutaneous electrical stimulation of the vagus nerve. This treatment method was abandoned due to its significant side effects, which included slow heart rate, dizziness and syncope. Vagus nerve stimulation has since regained its status as an adjunctive treatment for certain types of epilepsy, especially partial seizures, and also as an adjunctive treatment for treatment-resistant major depressive disorder in adults.

== See also ==
- History of neuraxial anesthesia
