= Pain management during childbirth =

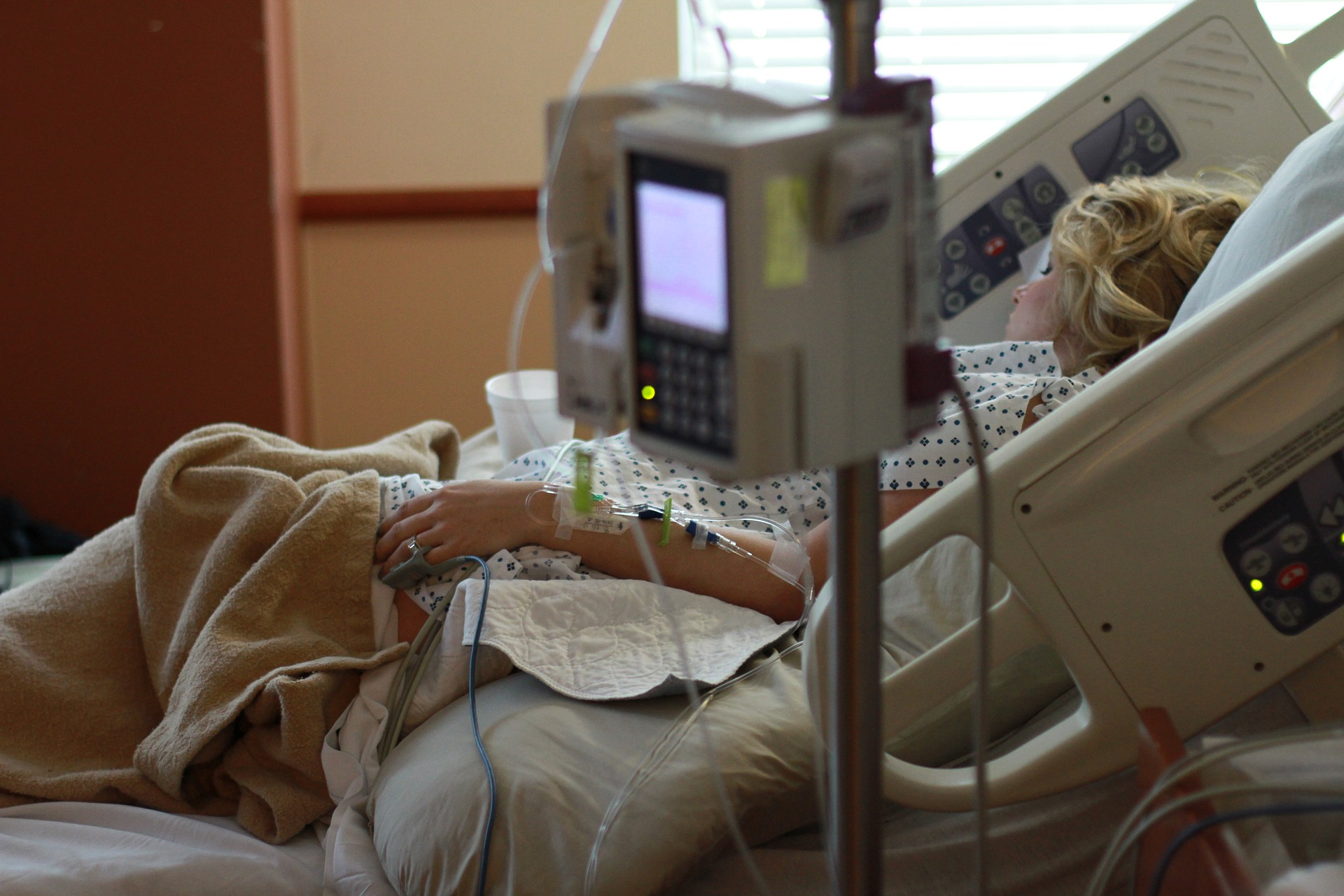
- Mother in labor appears to be in pain
- Specialty: Obstetrician

Pain management during childbirth is the partial treatment and a way of reducing any pain that a woman may experience during labor and delivery. The amount of pain a woman feels during labor depends partly on the size and position of her baby, the size of her pelvis, her emotions, the strength of the contractions, and her outlook. Tension increases pain during labor. Virtually all women worry about how they will cope with the pain of labor and delivery. Childbirth is different for each woman and predicting the amount of pain experienced during birth and delivery can not be certain.

== History ==
Prior to the 20th century, childbirth predominantly happened in the home, without access to any medical interventions for pain management. Childbirth was a leading cause of death for women, and many were fearful of the process, creating a large desire for pain management. But despite the demands of female patients, little relief was offered before the mid-19th century. Chemical anesthesia during labor was first introduced in 1847, receiving support from women and reluctance from physicians. Some doctors and religious authorities argued that pain relief in childbirth went contrary to God's choice to make childbirth painful; however, others specifically disputed this interpretation. Most opposition to anesthesia, though, was framed in terms of concern about its health consequences and physical effects on labour.

Anesthesia's use was popularized in 1853 by Queen Victoria's decision to use chloroform for pain relief during the birth of her eighth child. The procedure became known to women as "chloroform à la reine" (in the style of the queen).

In the early 20th century, a drug-induced state known as "twilight sleep" was developed by Carl Gauss and Bernhardt Kronig, two doctors in Freiburg, Germany. The procedure, especially when performed by untrained doctors, had a number of risks and side-effects. Its rise and fall coincided with both first-wave feminism and the anti-German sentiment that arose during World War I.

In 1956, Pope Pius XII approved the use of painless childbirth. The 1960s saw the rise of epidural analgesics for pain management.

== Preparation ==
Preparation for childbirth can affect the amount of pain experienced during childbirth. It is possible to take a childbirth class, consult with those managing the pregnancy, and write down questions that can assist in getting the information that a woman needs to help manage pain. Additionally, pregnant women can alleviate concerns by having positive discussions about pregnancy with their friends and family. Positive context and associations with childbirth can help women perceive labour as a rewarding experience, which may reduce the amount of pain felt. On the other hand, interactions with friends and family can also create negative expectations for childbirth, which increases future labour pain. As a result, it is best to prepare by receiving positive and calming encouragement to induce positive expectations that will help modulate labour pain.

== Non-pharmacological ==
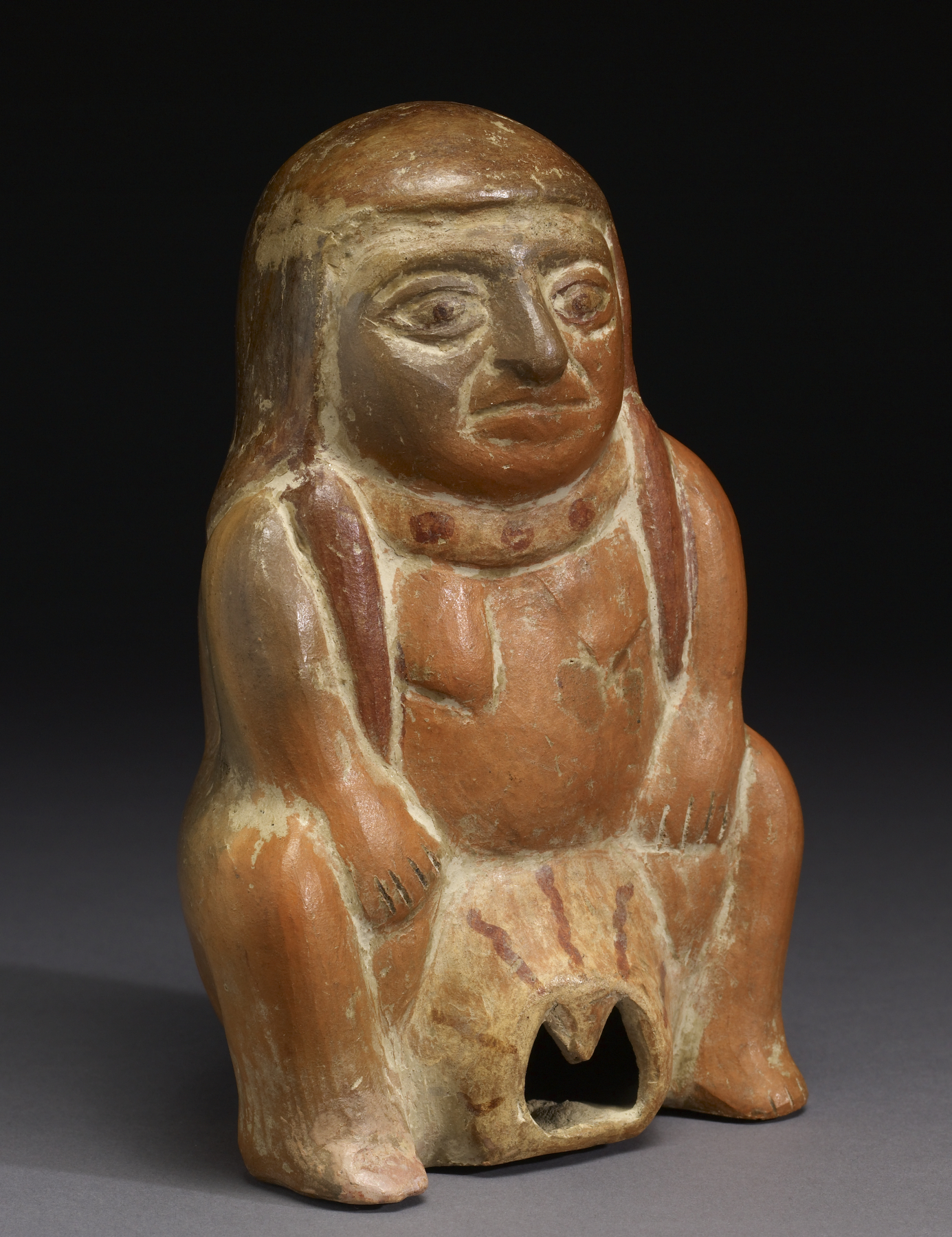
Moche – female figure in birthing position

Many methods help women to relax and make pain more manageable. A review of the effectiveness of non-medical approaches to pain relief found that water immersion, relaxation methods, and acupuncture relieved pain. These and other non-pharmacologic pain management options are further discussed below.

- Breathing and relaxation techniques
  - Relaxation methods may be helpful in reducing the risk of assisted vaginal births.
- Warm showers or baths
- Massage
  - Many types of massage can be used during various stages of labor. Literature suggests light touch or stroke massage techniques may aid in the release of oxytocin, which may help stimulate contractions and facilitate cervical dilatation. Various types of massage may also help soothe and distract from the pain of labor.
- Warm or cold compresses, such as heat on lower back or cold washcloth on forehead
  - Applying warm compresses, especially to the lower back area, while the cervix is dilating may help reduce pain during the first stage of labor and may even help to decrease the length of labor itself, however, the evidence supporting this is limited.
- Changing positions while in labor (stand, crouch, sit, walk, etc.)
- Use of a labor ball
  - Using a labor ball during childbirth first began in the 1980s. It is best used during the first stage of labor. Evidence suggests using a birthing ball can facilitate pain relief by supporting the perineum and providing gentle stimulation to the area during cervical dilatation. It may also aid in fetal descent through various positioning exercises and with gravity.
- Listening to music
  - Although little evidence supports music as an effective method in decreasing pain, it may provide a distraction or assist in creating a more positive birth experience which may ultimately decrease the chance of negative postpartum outcomes.
- Acupuncture
  - The use of acupuncture may be associated with fewer assisted vaginal births and caesarean sections.
- Continuous supportive care of a loved one, hospital staff member, or doula
  - The presence of a doula or support attendant may decrease the need for pharmacological pain control and increase the likelihood of spontaneous vaginal births as opposed to cesarean section. A positive support person may also assist in creating an environment leading to a more positive birth experience.
- Transcutaneous electrical nerve stimulation (TENS) have had additional research into their effectiveness and have shown marked effectiveness in reducing pain. Research has measured pain at 30 minutes interval after TENS therapy from between 30 and 120 minutes after TENS therapy and also from 2h to 24h post-delivery using the visual analog score. Those who underwent therapy had minimally increased pain scores, while those that didn't, had a significant amount of pain at over 9.5 compared to 6.02 for those who had undergone TENS therapy 2–24h after delivery.
- Other methods include hypnosis, biofeedback, sterile water injection, and aromatherapy; however, there are limited studies that demonstrate the effectiveness of in reducing pain during labor and delivery by using these methods.

=== Water and childbirth ===
According to the American Office of Women's Health, laboring in a tub of warm water, also called hydrotherapy, helps women feel physically supported, and keeps them warm and relaxed. It may also be easier for laboring women to move and find comfortable positions in the water.

Immersion in specifically warm water during the first stage of labor may decrease the need for analgesia and possibly shorten the duration of labor; However, warm water is known to slow down contractions, so it is advised to avoid it too early in stage 1. There is little data to suggest that water immersion during the second and third stages of labor significantly reduces the use of pharmacologic interventions.

In waterbirthing, a woman remains in the water for delivery. The American Academy of Pediatrics has expressed concerns about delivering in water because of a lack of studies showing its safety and because of the rare but reported chance of complications.

== Medical and pharmaceutical methods of pain control ==
Physicians, nurse practitioners, physician assistants, nurses and midwives will typically ask the woman in labor if there is a need of pain relief. Many pain relief options work well when given by a trained and experienced clinician. Clinicians also can use different methods for pain relief at different stages of labor. Still, not all options are available at every hospital and birthing center. Depending on the health history of the mother, the presence of allergies or other concerns, some choices will work better than others.

=== Opioids ===
There are many methods of pain relief during labor. Opioids are a type of analgesia that is commonly used during childbirth to assist in pain relief. They can be injected directly into the muscle in the form of a shot or put into an IV. These medications may cause unwanted side effects like drowsiness, itching, nausea, or vomiting to the laboring mother. Although they are short acting in the laboring mother, it takes longer for an infant to clear these medications. All opioids can cross the placenta and may poorly affect the baby by causing problems with heart rate, breathing, or brain function. For this reason, opioids are not given close to delivery. They can be beneficial in early labor, however, since they can help dull pain, but do not impair the mother's ability to move or push. Their use also does not seem to be linked to a higher chance of cesarean sections.

=== Epidural and spinal blocks ===
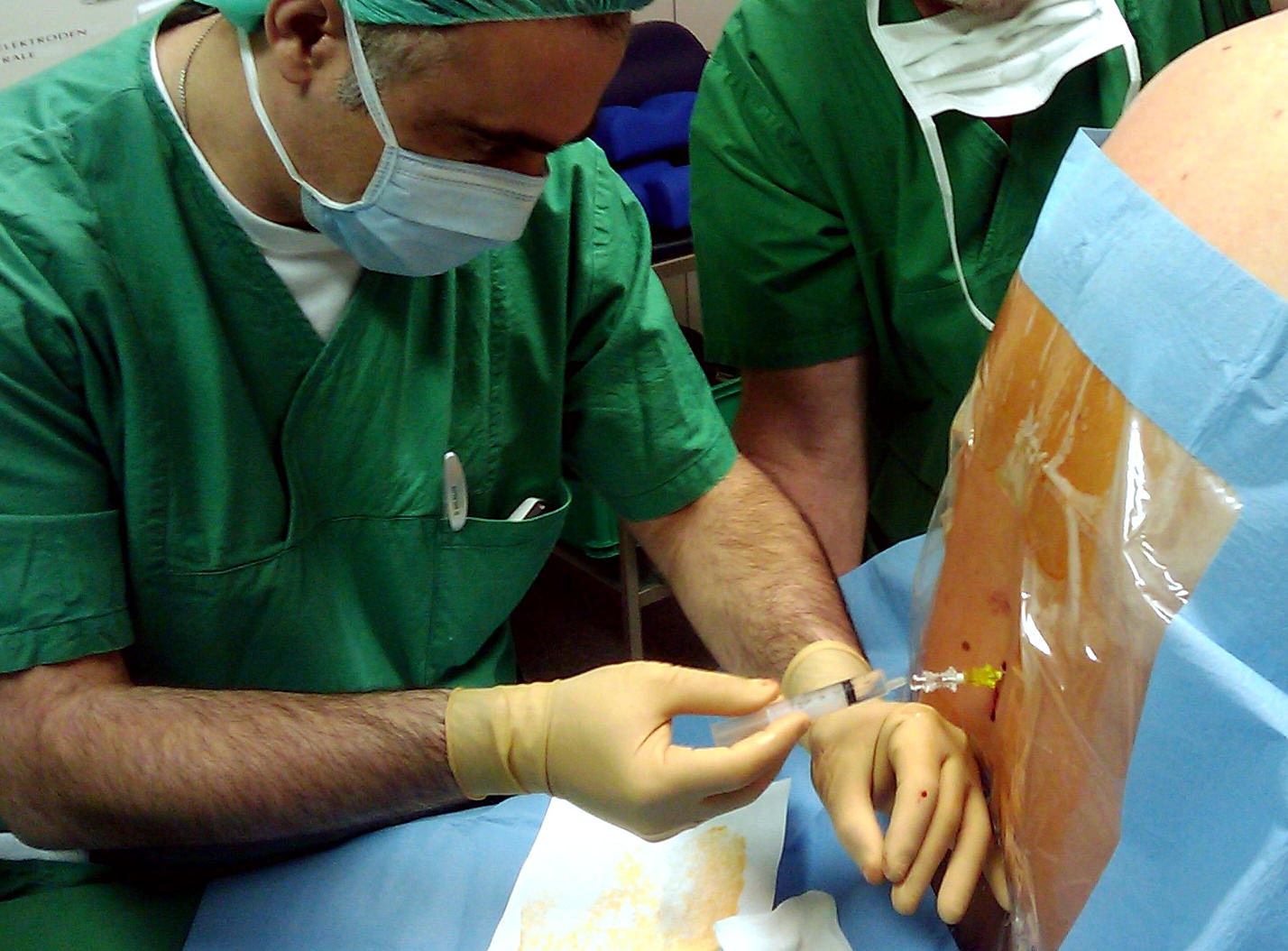
An anesthetic medication is injected into the spine.

An epidural is a procedure that involves placing a tube (catheter) into the lower back, into a small space below the spinal cord. Small doses of medicine can be given through the tube as needed throughout labor. With a spinal block, a small dose of medicine is given as a shot into the spinal fluid in the lower back. Spinal blocks usually are given only once during labor. Epidural and spinal blocks allow most women to be awake and alert with very little pain during labor and childbirth. With an epidural, pain relief starts 10 to 20 minutes after the medicine has been given. The degree of numbness felt can be adjusted. With spinal block, good pain relief starts right away, but it only lasts one to two hours.

Although movement is possible, walking may not be if the medication affects motor function. An epidural can lower blood pressure, which can slow the baby's heartbeat. Fluids given through IV are given to lower this risk. Fluids can cause shivering. But women in labor often shiver with or without an epidural. If the covering of the spinal cord is punctured by the catheter, a bad headache may develop. Treatment can help the headache. An epidural can cause a backache that can occur for a few days after labor. An epidural can prolong the first and second stages of labor. If given late in labor or if too much medicine is used, there is the risk of labor dystocia, difficult or obstructed labor, where the cervix may not be thinned and dilated sufficiently, possibly entrapping the fetal shoulders. An epidural increases the risk of instrumental or assisted vaginal delivery.

=== Pudendal block ===
In this procedure a doctor injects numbing medicine into the vagina and the nearby pudendal nerve. This nerve carries sensation to the lower part of the vagina and vulva. This method of pain control is only used late in labor, usually right before the baby's head comes out. With a pudendal block, there is some pain relief but the laboring woman remains awake, alert, and able to push the baby out. The baby is not affected by this medicine and it has very few disadvantages.

=== Inhaled analgesia ===
Another form of pharmacologic pain relief available for laboring mothers is inhaled nitrous oxide. This is typically a 50/50 mixture of nitrous oxide with air that is an inhaled analgesic and anesthetic. Nitrous oxide has been used for pain management in childbirth since the late 1800s. The use of inhaled analgesia is commonly used in the UK, Finland, Australia, Singapore and New Zealand, and is gaining in popularity in the United States.

Although this method of pain control does not provide as much pain relief as an epidural, there are many benefits to this type of analgesia. Nitrous oxide is inexpensive and can be used safely at any stage of labor. It is useful for women wanting mild pain relief while maintaining mobility and have less monitoring than would be required with an epidural. It is also useful in early labor to assist with pain relief and used in conjunction with other non-pharmacologic pain methods such as birthing balls, position changes, and even possibly water birth. The gas is self-administered so the laboring mom has full control of how much gas she wishes to inhale at any given time.

Nitrous oxide has the added benefit of limited side effects. Some mothers may experience some dizziness, nausea, vomiting, or drowsiness, however, since dosing is determined by the patient, once these symptoms begin she can limit her use. The gas takes effect quickly, but also lasts a short period of time so she must hold the mask to her face in order to benefit from the effects of analgesia. There is very little effect to the baby since it is quickly eliminated by the baby as soon as it begins breathing. Evidence does not suggest any clinically significant risk factors in the use of nitrous oxide gas as opposed to other methods of pain management both non-pharmacologic and pharmacologic in terms of Apgar or cord blood gas. There is also limited evidence to determine whether there are any increased occupational risks to the healthcare provider associated with the use of nitrous oxide.

== Pain management after childbirth ==
Perineal pain after childbirth has immediate and long-term negative effects for women and their babies. These effects can interfere with breastfeeding and the care of the infant. The pain from injection sites and possible episiotomy is managed by the frequent assessment of the report of pain from the mother. Pain can come from possible lacerations, incisions, uterine contractions and sore nipples. Appropriate medications are usually administered. Routine episiotomies have not been found to reduce the level of pain after the birth.

== Research ==
Genetic research has also tied pain experienced during labour to potassium voltage regulation in neurons, suggesting the potential for specific medication targeting these nociceptive receptors.

== See also ==
- Epidural
- Lumbar puncture
- Combined spinal and epidural anaesthesia
- Intrathecal administration
