= Continuous wound infiltration =

Pain management technique

Continuous wound infiltration (CWI) refers to the continuous infiltration of a local anesthetic into a surgical wound to aid in pain management during post-operative recovery.

== History ==
Continuous wound infiltration first appeared on the market in the late 1990s when a US company (I-Flow Corporation) found a way to evenly spread and continuously infiltrate a local anesthetic, via a specially designed multi holed catheter, inside the wound, to enable post-operative pain treatment.

The benefits of wound infiltration are quite prominent which is the reason why "single shot" wound infiltration had already been done for several decades. The limiting factor of the single shot approach has always been the half-life period of the local anesthetics which would not allow a long term post-op pain treatment.

== Technique ==
A local anesthetic is administered into the wound with a specially designed, multi-holed catheter. The catheter allows for even spread throughout the entire area of the wound, depending on the size of the catheter.

The surgeon places the catheter during surgery shortly before closing the surgical incision. For best catheter placement and nerve blockage, the catheter must be located as close as possible to the nerve. Tunneling should be applied if a distal infiltration of the adjacent nerve root is preferred.

For thoracic and abdominal surgeries, the surgeon will place the catheter superior to the respective fascias. For thoracic surgeries, the catheter goes superior to the pleura. For all type of abdominal surgeries the catheter should be close to the peritoneum. A recent systematic review showed that deep wound catheters (placed pre-peritoneally or in the transversus abdominis plane), provide better pain control than subcutaneous wound catheters after abdominal surgery.

After being placed, the catheter is connected to an elastomeric pump that ensures a constant delivery of the anesthetic and also serves as the drug container. Depending on the flow rate and the pump size, one pump can provide continuous wound infiltration for several days.

== Outcomes ==
CWI is considered as an effective alternative to other regional anesthetic techniques such as peripheral nerve blocks and spinal-epidural anesthesia. It is especially applicable where those techniques are contra-indicated, such as in patients using potent coagulants.

Besides, some patients might prefer an alternative to epidural analgesia because of epidural-related side effects. Epidural analgesia may lead to serious neurological complications (epidural haematoma and abscess, with an incidence of one in 1000–6000 for thoracic epidurals) and need for preoperative placement in awake patients, considered as cumbersome by many patients, sometimes leading to refusal.

The outcome in most cases is beneficial for the patient because of a faster return to normal body functions, less pain, faster rehabilitation and less side effects. CWI offers the opportunity to significantly minimize the use of narcotics during post-op pain management and reduces the side-effects (post-operative nausea and vomiting) that come with opioids. Also, CWI has been shown to provide more excellent satisfaction scores compared to alternatives.
