= Fidel Pagés =

Spanish military surgeon (1886–1923)

Fidel Pagés Miravé
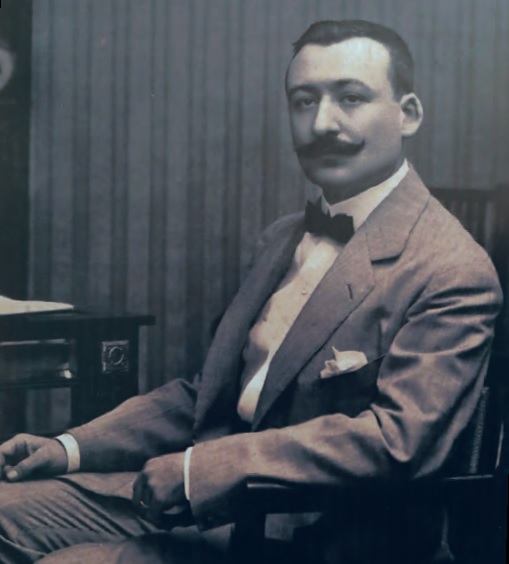
- Born: 26 January 1886; Huesca, Spain
- Died: 21 September 1923 (aged 37); Quintanapalla, Spain
- Education: University of Zaragoza; Central University of Madrid
- Years active: 1908-1923
- Known for: Discoverer of epidural anesthesia
- Medical career
- Profession: Physician
- Institutions: Spanish Army; Provincial Hospital of Madrid
- Sub-specialties: Surgery

Fidel Pagés Miravé (26 January 1886 – 21 September 1923) was a Spanish military surgeon, known for developing the technique of epidural anesthesia.

He practised a wide range of traumatological and surgical techniques, both for war injuries and civil purposes, contributed to the modernisation of surgery in Spain and participated actively in the reorganisation of the Spanish Military Health system in the 1920s. Due to his early accidental death, his pioneering work in epidural anesthesia (or metameric anesthesia as he called it) went unnoticed for many years outside of Spanish speaking countries.

== Early life and education ==
Fidel Pagés was born and grew up in the Spanish city of Huesca in an upper-middle-class family. His parents were Juan Pagés Maraque and Concepción Miravé Sesé. His father died when Fidel was 7 and his mother remarried, an episode which would have great effect in the personality of the child.

In 1901 he started his studies of Medicine at the University of Zaragoza, where he received his degree in Medicine and Surgery with honors in 1908. During these years he also learned the German language, something that would be of importance later in his career when it gave him the opportunity to exchange experiences with surgeons of German origin.

== Career ==
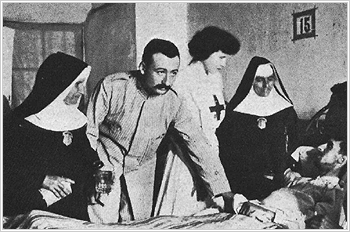
Pagés visiting injured soldiers at the Docker Hospital in Melilla in 1909.

Pagés entered the Army Medical Corps in 1908 and, after one year at the Military Health Academy, received the rank of second medical officer in June 1909. The second Rif War was at its peak at this point: the Spanish Army had suffered a series of dramatic defeats (Barranco del Lobo) and the medical services in Melilla were overwhelmed. Pagés was sent in July 1909 as part of the medical reinforcements that were to set up several emergency military hospitals in the city. He stayed in Melilla for two years, first as surgeon's assistant during the six months of the campaign, and later also organizing the improvement of the equipment in mountain ambulances and instructing recruits in the Medical Corps. He returned to mainland Spain in the meantime, staying for some months in the Military Hospital of Carabanchel. During his stay in Melilla he gained fundamental experience in emergency surgery.

He left Melilla in 1911, after he was promoted to first medical officer. He published his first paper in 1912, "The fight against infectious illnesses in campaign", analysing the techniques that Japanese doctors had successfully developed during the Russo-Japanese War and which he had applied in Melilla. He served in several Spanish cities and earned a PhD in Madrid in 1913. That same year he married Berta Concepción Bergenmann y Quirós, a Spanish woman of Spanish-German descent. He returned to Madrid in 1915 to work at the Ministry of War. That same year he placed first in a competition for a position at the Provincial Hospital of Madrid. Pagés' prestige grew during his stay in Madrid and he was appointed to attend in several occasions Queen María Cristina, with whom he would develop a personal friendship.

In 1917, during World War I, due to his knowledge of German language and his experience in war injuries, he was commissioned to inspect prisoners of war camps in Austria and Hungary. During these months he also practised a great number of surgery operations in the Vienna Military Hospital no. 2. Pagés was probably acquainted with the German and French medical literature on previous experiences with anaesthetics in the epidural space and had contact with German surgeons in Vienna who had experimented with that technique.

After his return to Madrid, he continued practising surgery in the General Hospital of Madrid, publishing several medical articles (he became the editor in chief of the "Revista de Sanidad Militar", English: Journal of Military Health) and working in the Ministry of War. In 1919 he founded, together with doctor Ramírez de la Mata the "Revista Española de Cirugía" (English: Spanish Journal of Surgery), where he published a great number of comments and articles about anesthesia (on Meltzer's endotracheal anesthesia, Ombredanne's inhaler, Trendelenburg's cannula, Victor Horsley's hedonal intravenous anesthesia and Le Filliatre's total spinal anesthesia).

In 1920 he was assigned to the Emergency Military Hospital in Madrid, although he was stationed briefly in Melilla in 1921 as a result of the Spanish colonial disaster of Annual, where he practiced hundreds of surgical interventions on injured troops. Two of his main contributions during this time are the publication of his seminal article on epidural anesthesia and a series of articles defending early emergency interventions for abdominal injuries based on his war experiences (against the general opinion of the time when non-interventionism or late hospitalised intervention was recommended).

== Work on epidural anesthesia ==
In 1901, the use of anaesthetics via the epidural space was first reported, mostly for the treatment of urological diseases but not for surgical procedures. Several techniques were developed in the following years, but never became popular for surgical purposes: most institutions made the transition from a slight sedation to twilight sleep to heavy sedation to general anaesthesia.

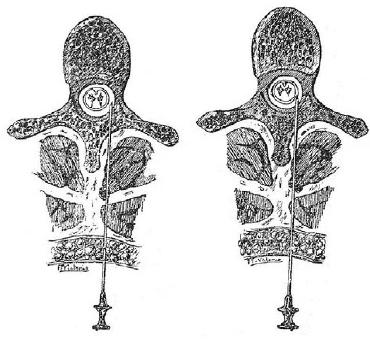
Original drawing by Fidel Pagés explaining the technique of epidural anesthesia

Fidel Pagés published an article in July 1921 called "Anestesia Metamérica" (i.e. metameric anesthesia or epidural anesthesia) in the "Revista Española de Cirugía" and the "Revista de Sanidad Militar". In the article he explained the technique he had developed in order to be able to inject the anesthetics in the lumbar region, leaving the spinal canal untouched and without the need to reach complete anesthesia.

The article explained how Pagés, who had frequently performed spinal anesthesias, developed the idea of injecting the anesthetics through the lumbar space between the 4th and 5th vertebrae, described 43 operations using this technique, provided details on each step and advised on the right dose of anaesthetics (twice as much as was previously recommended in similar techniques). It also explained the effects of gradual insensibility and motor paralysis, the indications and contraindications and concluded recommending the use of this technique for surgical interventions. The technique was widely put into practice in the following months during the Spanish campaign in the Rif.

== Publications ==
Title	Year
La lucha en campaña contra de las enfermedades infecciosas	1912
Patogenia de las bradicardias	1913
Tratamiento incruento de los tumores (translated)	1913
Tratamiento de las fracturas diafisarias de los huesos largos de las extremidades producidas por proyectiles de arma de fuego	1914
La teoría y práctica del injerto óseo	1918
Un caso de estrangulamiento retrógrado de epiplón	1919
Contribución al estudio de la cirugía plástica de mejilla	1919
La anestesia intratraqueal de Meltzer	1919
El aparato de Ombredanne	1919
La cánula de Trendelenburg	1919
La anestesia intrarectal de Víctor Horsley	1919
La anestesia intravenosa de hedonal	1919
La anestesia espinal completa de Le Filliatre	1919
Tratamiento de las fracturas de olécranon por el enclavamiento y la extensión continua	1919
La utilización de las fascias en cirugía	1921
Anestesia Metamérica	1921
La gastroentrostomia con collar epiplóico y heridas abdominales de guerra	1922
Aspectos quirúrgicos del estreñimiento	1923

== Death and posthumous recognition ==
In 1922 Pagés was promoted to Major Medical. On 21 September 1923 he died in a traffic accident in Quintanapalla, near Burgos, while returning to Madrid with his family from their summer vacation in Cestona, near San Sebastián. After his death, many tributes were performed in Spain. In the Urgency Hospital of Madrid, the Queen unveiled a plaque in his memory; another plaque was placed in the Military Hospital in San Sebastián; and in 1926 the Docker Hospital in Melilla was renamed after him.

His work had neither been translated nor presented in the few medical congresses of that time and was practically forgotten. In 1931, Italian surgeon Achille Mario Dogliotti described what he thought was a new type of regional anesthesia and was credited for some years with the discovery of epidural anesthesia. Only with the passage of time, an Argentinian scientific journal claimed recognition for the Spanish doctor, who was then given full credit by Dogliotti and the medical community.

The Spanish Society of Anesthesiology, Reanimation and Pain Therapy (SEDAR) awards every two years a prize that bears Pagés' name. In addition, the Ministry of Defense of Spain in June 2007 created the Award for Military Health Research Fidel Pagés Miravé.

== See also ==
- History of neuraxial anesthesia
