= Neuraxial blockade =

Type of local anaesthesia

Neuraxial blockade is local anaesthesia placed around the nerves of the central nervous system, such as spinal anaesthesia, caudal anaesthesia, epidural anaesthesia, and combined spinal and epidural anaesthesia. The technique is used in surgery, obstetrics, and for postoperative and chronic pain relief.

== See also ==
- History of neuraxial anesthesia
