= Sufentanil =

Synthetic opioid analgesic drug

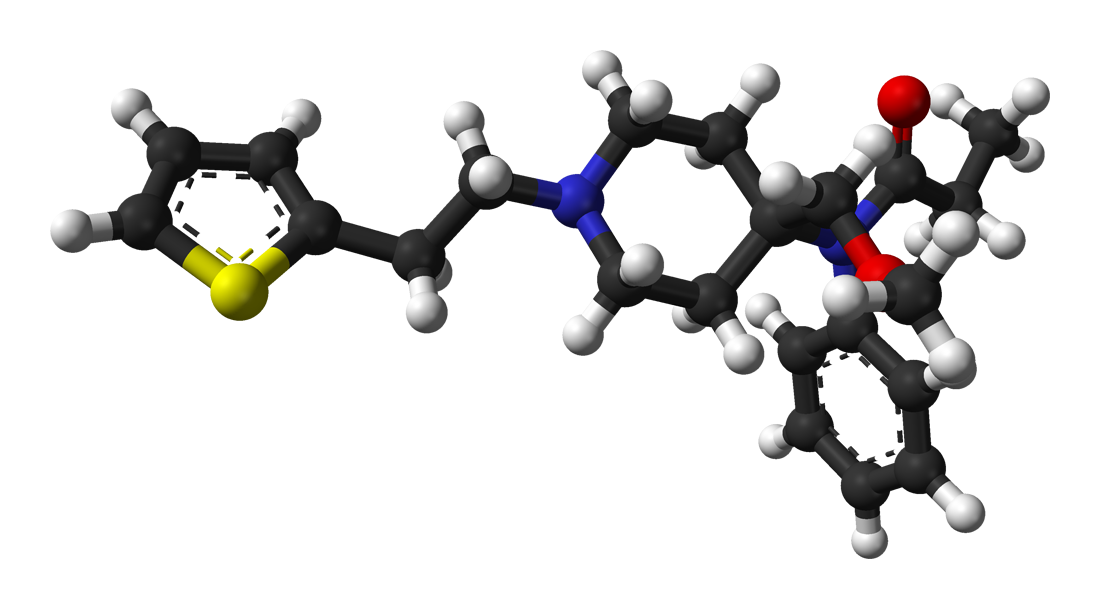

Clinical data
- Trade names: Dsuvia, Sufenta, Zalviso, others
- Other names: R30730
- AHFS/Drugs.com: Monograph
- License data: US DailyMed: Sufentanil
- Routes of administration: Intravenous therapy (IV), intramuscular injection (IM), subcutaneous injection (SQ), epidural, intrathecal, sublingual
- ATC code: N01AH03 (WHO)

Legal status
- Legal status: AU: S8 (Controlled drug); BR: Class A1 (Narcotic drugs); CA: Schedule I; DE: Anlage III (Special prescription form required); UK: Class A; US: Schedule II; EU: Rx-only; SE: Förteckning II; In general: ℞ (Prescription only)

Pharmacokinetic data
- Bioavailability: Sublingual: 53% IV/IM/SC: 100%
- Elimination half-life: 162 minutes
- Duration of action: 30 to 60 min

Identifiers
- IUPAC name: N-[4-(Methoxymethyl)-1-(2-thiofuran-2-ylethyl)-4-piperidyl]-N-phenylpropanamide
- CAS Number: 56030-54-7
- PubChem CID: 41693
- IUPHAR/BPS: 3534
- DrugBank: DB00708
- ChemSpider: 38043
- UNII: AFE2YW0IIZ
- KEGG: D05938; as salt: D00845
- ChEBI: CHEBI:9316
- ChEMBL: ChEMBL658
- CompTox Dashboard (EPA): DTXSID6023604
- ECHA InfoCard: 100.168.858

Chemical and physical data
- Formula: C_{22}H_{30}N_{2}O_{2}S
- Molar mass: 386.55 g·mol^{−1}
- 3D model (JSmol): Interactive image
- Melting point: 97 °C (207 °F)
- SMILES: O=C(N(c1ccccc1)C2(COC)CCN(CC2)CCc3sccc3)CC
- InChI: InChI=1S/C22H30N2O2S/c1-3-21(25)24(19-8-5-4-6-9-19)22(18-26-2)12-15-23(16-13-22)14-11-20-10-7-17-27-20/h4-10,17H,3,11-16,18H2,1-2H3; Key:GGCSSNBKKAUURC-UHFFFAOYSA-N

Sufentanil, sold under the brand names Sufenta among others, is a synthetic opioid analgesic drug approximately 5 to 10 times as potent as its parent drug, fentanyl, and 500 to 1,000 times as potent as morphine. Structurally, sufentanil differs from fentanyl through the addition of a methoxymethyl group on the piperidine ring (which increases potency but is believed to reduce duration of action), and the replacement of the phenyl ring by thiophene. Sufentanil was first synthesized at Janssen Pharmaceutica in 1974.

== Medical uses ==
Sufentanil offers properties of sedation and can be used as analgesic component of anesthetic regimen during an operation.

Because of its extremely high potency, it is often used in surgery and post-operative pain management for patients that are heavily opioid dependent/opioid tolerant because of long term opiate use for chronic pain or illicit opiate use. It is also used in surgery and post-operative pain control in people that are taking high dose buprenorphine for chronic pain because it has the potency and binding affinity strong enough to displace buprenorphine from the opioid receptors in the central nervous system and provide analgesia.

In 2018, the Food and Drug Administration (FDA) approved Dsuvia, a sublingual tablet form of the drug, that was developed in a collaboration between AcelRx Pharmaceuticals and the United States Department of Defense for use in battlefield settings where intravenous (IV) treatments may not be readily available. The decision to approve this new potent synthetic opioid came under criticism from politicians and from the chair of the FDA advisory committee, who fear that the tablets will be easily diverted to the illegal drug market. Dsuvia has since been withdrawn from the market due to "unresolvable manufacturing constraints."

== Society and culture ==
=== Brand names ===
Sufentanil is marketed under various brand names including Dsuvia, Dzuveo, Sufenta, and Sufentil.

== Veterinary use ==
Sufentanil is used both as an analgesic and as part of an anaesthetic protocol. In cats the half-life of sufentanil is longer than that of fentanyl and alfentanil. In dogs sufentanil produces a better anaesthetic recovery with similar analgesic and respiratory depression than fentanyl. One report suggests that for post-operative pain bupivacaine and sufentanil provides greater analgesia than fentanyl and bupivacaine in dogs. There is little information on the use of sufentanil in large animals. Due to the greater risk of cardiovascular and respiratory depression sufentanil is rarely used in practice.
