= Radicular veins =

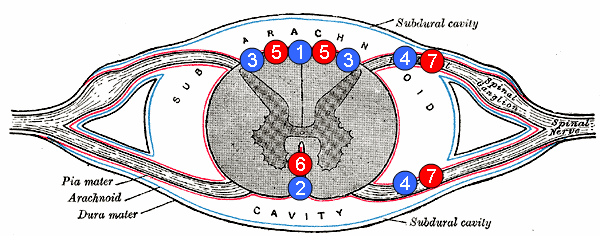
- 1: Posterior spinal vein 2: Anterior spinal vein 3: Posterolateral spinal vein 4: Radicular (or segmental medullary) vein 5: Posterior spinal arteries 6: Anterior spinal artery 7: Radicular (or segmental medullary) artery

Details
- Artery: Radicular artery

Identifiers
- Latin: venae radiculares

Radicular veins (or segmental medullary veins) are segmental veins providing venous drainage of the spinal cord and canal. They communicate with anterior and posterior spinal veins as well as epidural venous plexus. They exit the spinal canal through the intervertebral foramina, accompanying the corresponding of radicular arteries.
