= Baricity =

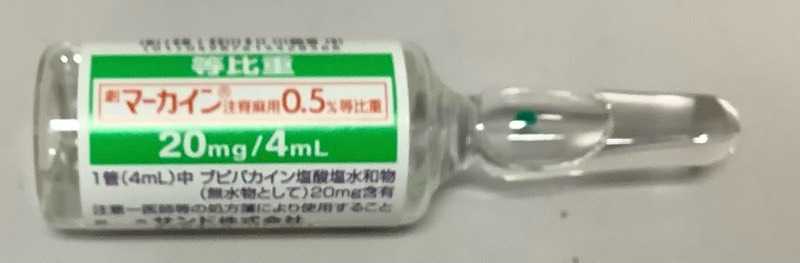
An isobaric liquid formulation of bupivacaine, a local anesthetic used in spinal anesthesia

Baricity refers to the ratio of the densities (density) of a substance, e.g., spinal local anesthetic, compared to the mean density of human cerebrospinal fluid, both at 37°C. Baricity is used in anesthesia to determine the manner in which a particular drug will spread in the intrathecal space.

== Description ==
The mean density of cerebrospinal fluid at 37°C is 1.0003 g litre^{−1}, with a range of 1.0000–1.0006 (± 2 standard deviations) g mlitre^{−1}. Solutions that have a density very close to that of cerebrospinal fluid have a baricity approaching 1.0 and are referred to as isobaric. Hypobaricity is defined as a solution with a density lower than 3 standard deviations below the mean density of cerebrospinal fluid. Thus, mathematically, a hypobaric solution has a baricity less than 0.99955 ((1.0003-0.00015*3)/1.0003). Hypobaric solutions are usually created by mixing the local anesthetic with distilled water. Theoretically, the lower boundary of hyperbaricity may be defined as 3 standard deviations above the mean, however, the actual density at which local anaesthetics behave consistently as a hyperbaric solution is less clear. Hyperbaric solutions are created by mixing dextrose 5-8% with the desired local anesthetic; such mixtures tend to have densities far above the theoretical lower boundary. Plain (no distilled water or dextrose added) solutions of bupivacaine (a commonly used spinal anesthetic) with a density of 0.9993 g litre^{−1} at 37°C are hypobaric in all patients.

Hyperbaric solutions will flow in the direction of gravity and settle in the most dependent areas of the intrathecal space. Conversely, hypobaric mixtures will rise in relation to gravitational pull. These properties allow the anesthesia provider to preferentially control the spread of the block by choice of mixture and patient positioning.
