= Eugen Aburel =

Romanian surgeon and obstetrician

Eugen Bogdan Aburel
- Born: January 23, 1899; Galați, Kingdom of Romania
- Died: December 16, 1975 (aged 76); Bucharest, Socialist Republic of Romania
- Education: Faculty of Medicine of Iași
- Known for: first to employ lumbar plexus block and caudal epidural analgesia during childbirth
- Awards: Ordre des Palmes académiques
- Scientific career
- Fields: surgery, gynaecology
- Workplaces: Tarnier Hospital; Boucicaut Hospital; Faculty of Medicine of Iași; Faculty of Medicine of Bucharest; Filantropia Hospital
- Thesis: Contribuțiuni la tratamentul infecției puerperale (1923)

Eugen Bogdan Aburel (January 23, 1899 – 16 December 1975) was a Romanian surgeon and obstetrician. He introduced innovative techniques in gynecologic surgery.

== Early life and education ==
He was born Galați; his father came from a family of Armenians of Moldavia, while his mother was a descendant of the family of metropolitan Veniamin Costache. He started his secondary studies at the Gheorghe Roșca Codreanu High School in Bârlad and finished them in 1917 at the Vasile Alecsandri High School in Galați. After attending the artillery military school in Botoșani and graduating with the rank of second lieutenant, he studied at the Faculty of Medicine of Iași, obtaining his doctor in medicine degree in 1923 with thesis Contribuțiuni la tratamentul infecției puerperale.

== Career ==
After deciding to specialize in obstetrics and gynecology, Aburel went in 1928 to Paris, where he worked at Tarnier and Boucicaut hospitals under professors Brindeau and Le Lorier. During this time, he also did research in the Physiology Department at Sorbonne University (under Louis Lapicque), and in the Laboratory of Applied Physiology at Henri-Rousselle Hospital. In 1933 he returned to Romania; three years later he was appointed Professor of Obstetrics and Gynecology at the Faculty of Medicine of Iași and in 1945 at the Faculty of Medicine of Bucharest.

In 1931, Aburel was the first to describe blocking the lumbar plexus during early labor, followed by a caudal epidural injection for the expulsion phase. In his work, which he presented at a meeting in Paris, he described using a continuous epidural catheter for pain relief during childbirth. He was the first to recognize and write about the afferent nerve supply to the uterus; he concluded that the uterus had a "double sensory innervation" with sympathetic fibers entering the spinal cord at T11–L2 and cerebrospinal fibers entering at S2–S4. His technique was to administer a sacral epidural anesthetic of dibucaine with adrenaline in the first stage of labor; if additional medication was needed, it would be administered through a needle catheter placed into the caudal canal during the second stage of labor or into the lumbar aortic plexus during the first. In 1934, Aburel developed the method of instillation abortion. In the 1950s, he was the first to describe radical trachelectomy as treatment for early-stage cervical cancers; this technique was all but forgotten until the 1990s, when it was revitalized, providing fertility-sparing options for patients with such cancers.

From 1952 to 1969, he was director of the Clinical Hospital of Obstetrics and Gynecology Filantropia; during that time, he also practiced at the maternity wards of the Witting, Colțea, and Polizu hospitals. In the late 1950s, Aburel was investigated by the Securitate for the scientific contacts he had in the West and for some of his past associations. In 1959, Theodor Burghele, the rector of the Faculty of Medicine, reported him to the communist authorities for "inappropriate attitude," and tried to dismiss him from his position as Chair of the Obstetrics and Gynecology Department; nevertheless, Aburel kept his position until he retired in 1969.

In 1968 he was elected a foreign corresponding member of the Académie Nationale de Médecine and in 1973 he was awarded the Ordre des Palmes académiques by the French Republic. In 1971 he was awarded the "Meritul Sanitar" Order, First class by the Romanian government. He died in Bucharest in 1975, at age 76.

== Works ==
- Contribuție la tratamentul infecției puerperale (1923)
- Abces apendicular la stînga (1927)
- Aburel, Eugen (1931). "L'Anesthésie locale continue (prolongée) en obstétrique". Bulletin de la Société d'Obstétrique et Gynécologie de Paris (in French). 20: 35–37.
- Aburel, Eugen (1932). Considerații asupra durerii în obstetrică: memoriu pentru docență (in Romanian). Iași: Tipografia "Arta".
- Aburel, Eugen (1934). "Recherche sur la sensibilité utéro-annexielle". Volume jubilaire en l'honneur du professeur Dr. C.I. Parhon (in French). Iași: Institut d’Arts Grafique "Bravo".
- Recherches sur les glandes endocrines pendent la vie intrautérine chez l'homme (collaborator, 1939)
- Nasta, Marius; Aburel, Eugen; Brill, Alfred (1957). Tuberculoza (in Romanian). Bucharest: Editura Medicală. OCLC 14591277.
- Aburel, Eugen (1959). Ginecologia (in Romanian). Bucharest: Editura Medicală. OCLC 14612034.
- Aburel, Eugen Bogdan; Boga, Coloman; Georgescu, I. (1971). Obstetrică și ginecologie pentru învățământul medical superior și medici (in Romanian). Bucharest: Editura Didactică și Pedagogică. OCLC 895200622.
- Aburel, Eugen; Petrescu, Virgil D. (1971). La tuberculose génitale de la femme (in French). Bucharest, Paris: Editura Medicală; Masson et Cie Editeurs. OCLC 1124893.

== See also ==
- History of neuraxial anesthesia
