= Intrathecal pump =

Device used to deliver drugs directly to CSF

An intrathecal pump is a medical device used to deliver (via an intrathecal catheter) medications directly into the space between the spinal cord and the protective sheath surrounding the spinal cord. Medications such as baclofen, bupivacaine, clonidine, morphine, hydromorphone, fentanyl, or ziconotide may be delivered in this manner to minimize the side effects often associated with the higher doses used in oral or intravenous delivery of these drugs.

== Medical uses ==
- Some cancer patients with opioid resistant pain or serious side effects may benefit from intrathecal pain management.
- Intrathecal drug delivery is indicated as a late stage option for patients with chronic non-cancer pain
- Baclofen pumps are often used for individuals with spasticity associated with quadriplegia or paraplegia

== Application ==
People with spastic diplegia or other forms of spasticity, or people in intolerable pain, who cannot tolerate side effects of the higher-dose oral medications of the same medication type, are potential candidates for that medication being administered via an intrathecal pump.

== Construction ==
The implantable intrathecal pump consists of a metal pump which stores and delivers the medication, and an intrathecal catheter which delivers the medication from the pump to the intrathecal space in the spine where the medication takes effect. Two types of pumps are available: a constant rate pump delivers the medication at a constant rate, and a programmable pump delivers the medication according to a rate determined by a computer program.

Also external pumps, with or without a subcutaneous port are used for intrathecal delivery.

The implantable medical device requires a surgical procedure; sometimes a surgeon performs a trial intrathecal injection or implants a temporary intrathecal catheter and pump to determine if the medication works to begin with, and thus if a pump is appropriate. A permanent intrathecal pump is then implanted if the patient derives at least 50% improvement in his or her symptoms.

== Maintenance ==
=== Refills ===
Intrathecal pumps require maintenance and need to be periodically refilled. How frequently this occurs is dependent on several factors, including drug concentration and dosage, and pump size. The refill frequency can range between one and six months for baclofen pumps.

=== Replacement ===
Intrathecal pumps periodically need to be replaced. For baclofen pumps, this may be once every 5–7 years.

== See also ==
- Infusion pump
- Intrathecal administration
