= Epidural venous plexus =

Veins in the spinal cord

The epidural venous plexus is a venous plexus embedded within the epidural fat of the vertebral canal. It is situated within the anterior epidural space (the outermost part of the spinal canal). The plexus extends from the skull base to the sacrum. It is surrounded by sparse fat (although its levels increase inferiorly). It drains into the cavernous sinus of the cranial cavity; it also communicates with the radicular veins.
