= Quintanapalla =

Coordinates: 42°25′N 3°32′W

- Municipality and town
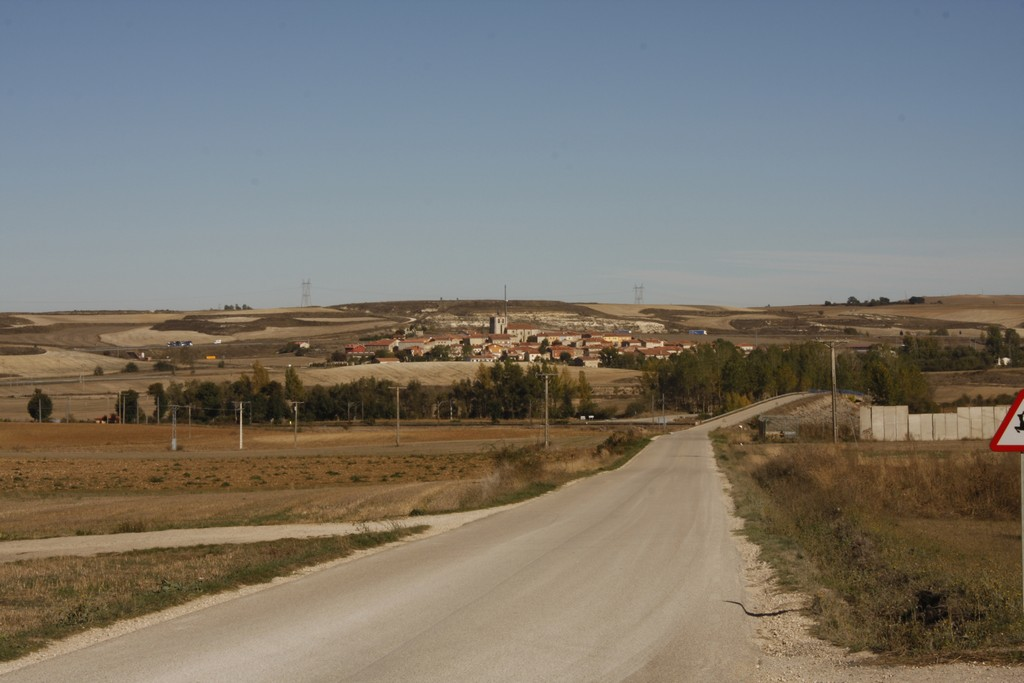
- View of Quintanapalla, 2009

- Coat of arms

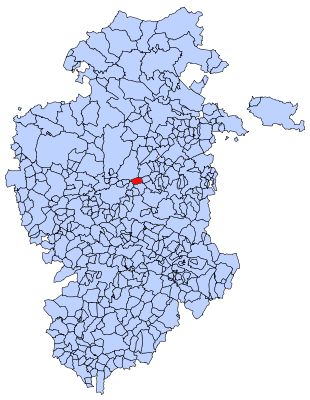
- Municipal location of Quintanapalla in Burgos province
- Country: Spain
- Autonomous community: Castile and León
- Province: Burgos
- Comarca: Alfoz de Burgos

Area
  - Total: 15.87 km^{2} (6.13 sq mi)
- Elevation: 933 m (3,061 ft)

Population (2025-01-01)
  - Total: 123
  - Density: 7.75/km^{2} (20.1/sq mi)
- Time zone: UTC+1 (CET)
  - Summer (DST): UTC+2 (CEST)
- Postal code: 09290
- Website: http://www.quintanapalla.es/

Quintanapalla is a municipality and town located in the province of Burgos, Castile and León, Spain. According to the 2004 census (INE), the municipality has a population of 116 inhabitants.
