= Théodore Tuffier =

French surgeon

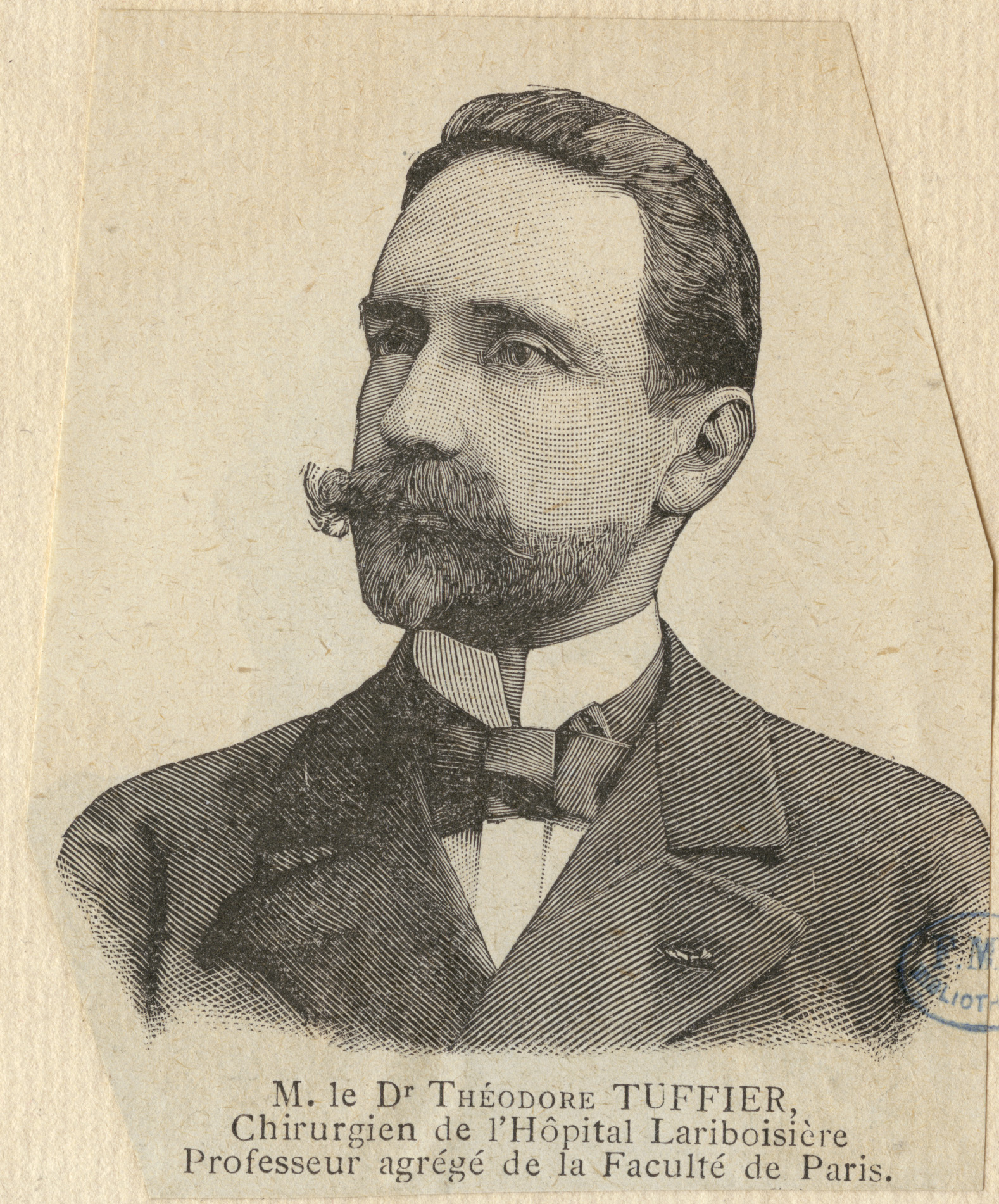
- Théodore Tuffier
- Born: Théodore-Marin Tuffier; 26 March 1857; Bellême, Orne, France
- Died: 27 October 1929 (aged 72); Paris, France
- Citizenship: France
- Occupation: Surgeon
- Relatives: Madeleine Herbault (wife); Jeanne (daughter); Gabrielle (daughter)
- Medical career
- Sub-specialties: Pulmonary; Cardiovascular surgery Spinal anaesthesia

Théodore-Marin Tuffier (26 March 1857 – 27 October 1929) was a French surgeon. He was a pioneer of pulmonary and cardiovascular surgery and of spinal anaesthesia.

== Life ==
He was born at Bellême in Orne in 1857 and was an intern from 1879 onwards. He was appointed a hospital surgeon in 1887 and initially worked at the Hôpital de la Pitié, then at the hôpital Beaujon. In 1889 he was made an associate professor and in 1891 he carried out the first successful re-section of an upper right lung destroyed by tuberculosis.

Tuffier worked on cardio-vascular surgery alongside Alexis Carrel and carried out one of the first successful interventions for an aortic aneurysm as well as the first dilation of an aortic stenosis. He also worked on the first vascular prostheses. He worked on 'triage' for the wounded during World War One.

Théodore Tuffier married Madeleine Herbault (1867–1940) and they had two daughters, Jeanne and Gabrielle. He is also notable as the last named French owner of the Fragonard painting A Young Girl Reading. He died in Paris in 1929. He is remembered in modern medicine through 'Tuffier's Line', an imaginary line connecting the iliac crests, used as a landmark for the Processus spinosus L4 to identify L4/5 vertebral interspace in spinal anaesthesia and lumbar puncture.

== Works ==
- (in French) Études expérimentales sur la chirurgie du rein, 1889
- (in French) Chirurgie du poumon, 1897
- (in French) L'analgésie chirurgicale par voie rachidienne, 1901
- (in French) Petite chirurgie pratique, 1903 (in collaboration with P. Desfosses)
- (in French) Chirurgie de l'estomac, 1907
