= Tuohy needle =

Epidural needle

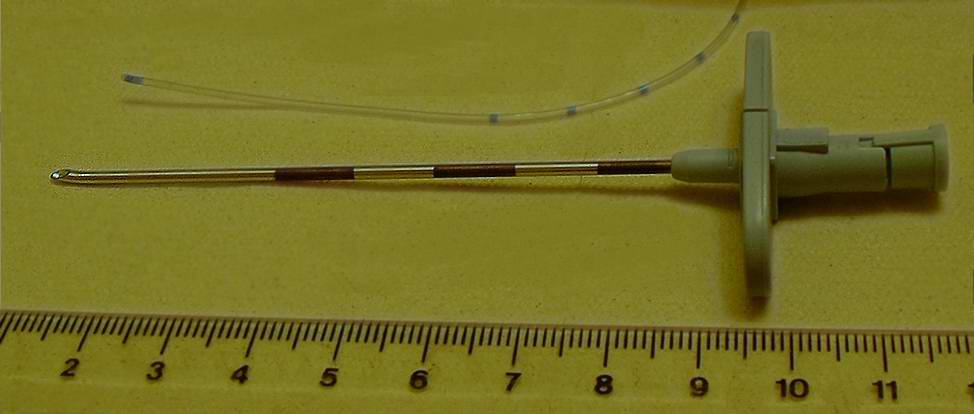
- A 16G Portex Tuohy needle and epidural catheter. Large rule marks 1 cm apart.
- Uses: Drug delivery
- Related items: Hypodermic needle

A Tuohy (/tOO-ee/) needle is a hollow hypodermic needle, very slightly curved at the end, suitable for inserting epidural catheters.

== Epidural needle ==
Literally, an epidural needle is simply a needle that is placed into the epidural space. To provide continuous epidural analgesia or anesthesia, a small hollow catheter may be threaded through the epidural needle into the epidural space, and left there while the needle is removed. There are multiple types of epidural needles as well as catheters, but in modern practice in developed nations, disposable materials are used to ensure sterility.

Epidural needles are designed with a curved tip to help prevent puncture of the dural membrane. Following accidental dural puncture, headache occurs in up to 85% of patients causing significant perioperative morbidity. However, in case of inadvertent dural perforation, the incidence of headache can be lowered by identifying the epidural space with the needle bevel oriented parallel to the longitudinal dural fibers which limits the size of the subsequent dural tear.

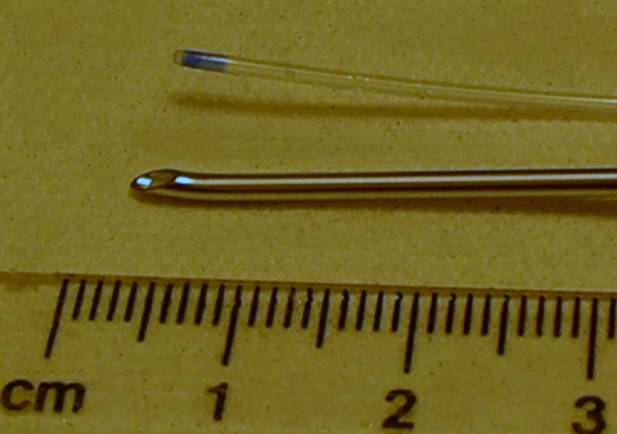
Close-up of needle and catheter tip, showing the curved end at the needle's tip. The needle features an anti-coring curve at its tip designed to cause a catheter passing through the needle's lumen to exit laterally at a 45 degree angle.

=== Types ===
Types of epidural needles include:

- The Crawford Needle
- The Tuohy Needle
- The Hustead Needle
- The Weiss Needle
- The Sprotte Spezial Needle
- Other Epidural Needles: Other less popular types are the Wagner needle (1957), the Cheng needle (1958), the Crawley needle (1968), the Foldes needle (1973), and the Bell needle (1975)—all variants of the Huber design with a blunted tip of varying sharpness.
- Variants like the Brace needle, a Crawford variant; the Lutz epidural needle (1963), with a pencil-point design for single-shot epidural use; the Scott needle (1985), a Tuohy needle with a Luer lock hub; and the Eldor needle (1993), designed for use with combined spinal epidural anesthesia.

== History ==
Though Ralph L. Huber (1915–2006), a Seattle dentist, was the inventor of this needle in 1940, it is known in the name of Edward Boyce Tuohy (1908–1959), a U.S. anesthesiologist who popularized it in 1945.
