= Combined spinal and epidural anaesthesia =

Regional anaesthetic technique

Combined spinal and epidural anaesthesia is a regional anaesthetic technique, which combines the benefits of both spinal anaesthesia and epidural anaesthesia and analgesia. The spinal component gives a rapid onset of a predictable block. The indwelling epidural catheter gives the ability to provide long lasting analgesia and to titrate the dose given to the desired effect.

== Indications ==
This technique also allows for better post operative pain relief. The epidural catheter may be left in place for up to 72 hours if required.

In labouring women, the onset of analgesia is more rapid with combined spinal and epidural anaesthesia compared with epidural analgesia. Combined spinal and epidural anaesthesia in labour was formerly thought to enable women to mobilise for longer compared with epidural analgesia, but this is not supported by a recent Cochrane review.

In the UK, the National Institute for Health and Care Excellence (September 2007) recommends combined spinal and epidural anaesthesia for women who require rapid onset of analgesia in labour. It further recommends the use of bupivacaine and fentanyl to establish the block.

== Insertion technique ==
Combined spinal-epidural anaesthesia is a highly specialised technique which should only be administered by a properly trained anaesthetic practitioner working with full aseptic technique.

The needle-through-needle technique involves the introduction of a Tuohy needle (epidural needle) into the epidural space. The standard technique of loss of resistance to injection may be employed.

A long fine spinal needle (25G) is then introduced via the lumen of the epidural needle and through the dura mater, into the subarachnoid space. A small pop is felt as the dura is punctured, and the correct position is confirmed when cerebrospinal fluid can be seen dripping from the spinal needle.

A small dose of local anaesthetic (e.g. bupivacaine) is then instilled. An opioid such as fentanyl may also be given if desired. The spinal needle is then withdrawn and the epidural catheter inserted in the standard manner.

Alternatively, a two-level approach may be undertaken. The epidural space is first located in the standard manner. Then, at another level, a standard spinal is performed. Finally, the epidural catheter is threaded through the Tuohy needle.

== Maintenance technique ==
When the epidural catheter has been inserted, the techniques of maintenance of block are very similar to those of epidural anaesthesia. The intensity of the block may be adjusted as desired. Large doses of local anaesthetic can produce sufficient anaesthesia for surgery. Alternatively, smaller doses can provide analgesia, e.g. in the postoperative period.

== Equipment ==
A standard epidural pack may be used with a standard spinal needle. However, the standard length of a spinal needle (90mm) may be insufficiently long to reach the subarachnoid space through the Tuohy needle. An extra-long needle (e.g., 120 mm) may be required. Alternatively, several manufacturers produce packs containing both a spinal and an epidural needle which are slightly modified to fit together.

== Complications ==
Combined spinal and epidural anaesthesia in labouring women is associated with more pruritus if fentanyl (25 μg) is given intrathecally, than low-dose epidural analgesia. However, no difference has been found in the incidence of post dural puncture headache, requirement for epidural blood patch or maternal hypotension.

It is unknown if infections are more likely to happen during combined spinal and epidural anaesthesia compared to spinal or epidural techniques. Post-dural-puncture headache has a similar incidence rate (0.8 to 2.5%) to the conventional epidural.
