= Local anesthesia =

Technique to induce the absence of sensation in a specific part of the body

- MeSH: D000772

Local anesthesia is any technique to induce the absence of sensation in a specific part of the body, generally for the aim of inducing local analgesia, i.e. local insensitivity to pain, although other local senses may be affected as well. It allows patients to undergo surgical and dental procedures with reduced pain and distress. In many situations, such as cesarean section, it is safer and therefore superior to general anesthesia.

The following terms are often used interchangeably:

- Local anesthesia, in a strict sense, is anesthesia of a small part of the body such as a tooth or an area of skin.
- Regional anesthesia is aimed at anesthetizing a larger part of the body such as a leg or arm.
- Conduction anesthesia encompasses a great variety of local and regional anesthetic techniques.

== Medical ==
A local anesthetic is a drug that causes reversible local anesthesia and a loss of nociception. When it is used on specific nerve pathways (nerve block), effects such as analgesia (loss of pain sensation) and paralysis (loss of muscle power) can be achieved. Clinical local anesthetics belong to one of two classes: aminoamide and aminoester local anesthetics. Synthetic local anesthetics are structurally related to cocaine. They differ from cocaine mainly in that they have no abuse potential and do not act on the sympathoadrenergic system, i.e. they do not produce hypertension or local vasoconstriction, with the exception of Ropivacaine and Mepivacaine that do produce weak vasoconstriction. Unlike other forms of anesthesia, a local can be used for a minor procedure in a surgeon's office as it does not put one into a state of unconsciousness. However, the physician should have a sterile environment available before doing a procedure in their office. Local anesthetics work primarily by reversibly blocking voltage-gated sodium channels in neuronal membranes, which prevents the initiation and propagation of action potentials along sensory nerves. This blocks nociceptive signals from reaching the brain.

Local anesthetics vary in their pharmacological properties and they are used in various techniques of local anesthesia such as:

- Topical anesthesia (surface) - Surface application on mucous membranes or skin.
- Infiltration anesthesia: Direct injection into tissue near the site of the procedure.
- Peripheral nerve blocks: Injection near specific nerves or plexuses (e.g., brachial, femoral).
- Neuraxial anesthesia: Includes spinal and epidural techniques, which anesthetize broader regions through nerve root blockade.

Adverse effects depend on the local anesthetic method and site of administration discussed in depth in the local anesthetic sub-article, but overall, adverse effects can be:

1. localized prolonged anesthesia or paresthesia due to infection, hematoma, excessive fluid pressure in a confined cavity, and severing of nerves & support tissue during injection.
2. systemic reactions such as depressed CNS syndrome, allergic reaction, vasovagal episode, and cyanosis due to local anesthetic toxicity.
3. lack of anesthetic effect due to infectious pus such as an abscess.

== History and development ==
Regional anesthesia has a rich history dating back to the late 19th century, with key pioneers advancing its development. Karl Koller introduced cocaine as the first local anesthetic in 1884, revolutionizing pain management.

August Bier performed the first spinal anesthesia in 1898, while James Leonard Corning explored epidural techniques.

Gaston Labat, often called the "father of regional anesthesia in America," founded the American Society of Regional Anesthesia in 1923 and authored the influential textbook Regional Anesthesia: Its Technic and Clinical Application. His work standardized techniques and promoted the field's growth.

Later, Manuel Martínez Curbelo pioneered continuous spinal anesthesia in the 1940s.

These innovations laid the foundation for modern regional anesthesia, enabling safer, targeted pain relief.

Ultrasound guidance has been one of the most significant innovations in regional anesthesiology, allowing real-time visualization of internal anatomy for the first time.

== Non-pharmacological local anesthetic techniques ==
Local pain management that uses other techniques than analgesic medication include:

- Transcutaneous electrical nerve stimulation, which has been found to be ineffective for lower back pain, however, it might help with diabetic neuropathy.
- Pulsed radiofrequency, neuromodulation, direct introduction of medication and nerve ablation may be used to target either the tissue structures and organ/systems responsible for persistent nociception or the nociceptors from the structures implicated as the source of chronic pain.

== See also ==
- Continuous wound infiltration
