= Intrathecal administration =

Drug injected into the spinal canal

Subarachnoid space
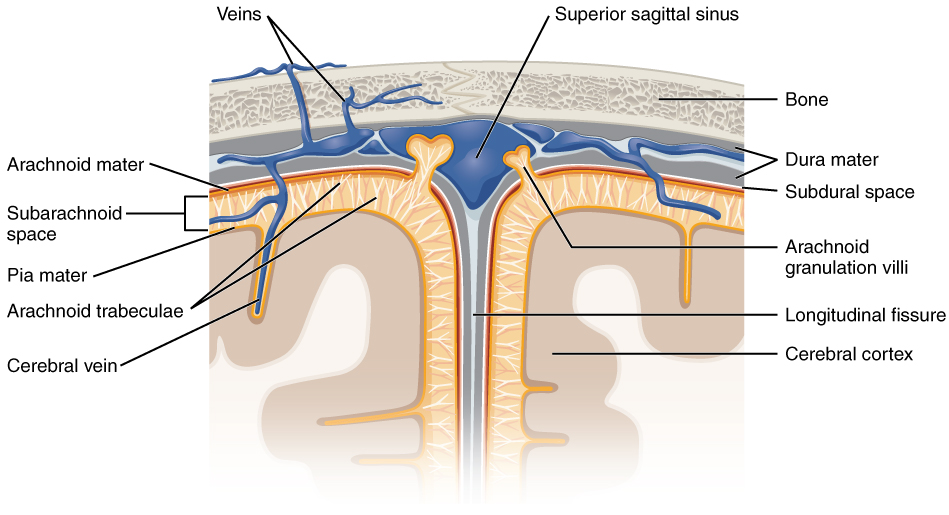
- Diagrammatic representation of a section across the top of the skull, showing the membranes of the brain, etc. ("Subarachnoid space" visible at left.)

- Diagrammatic transverse section of the medulla spinalis and its membranes. (Subarachnoid cavity colored blue.)

Details

Identifiers
- Latin: Spatium subarachnoideum, cavum subarachnoideale

Intrathecal administration is a route of administration for drugs via an injection into the spinal canal, or into the subarachnoid space (syn. intrathecal space) so that it reaches the cerebrospinal fluid (CSF). It is useful in several applications, such as for spinal anesthesia, chemotherapy, or pain management. This route is also used to introduce drugs that fight certain infections, particularly post-neurosurgical. Typically, the drug is given this way to avoid being stopped by the blood–brain barrier, as it may not be able to pass into the brain when given orally. Drugs given by the intrathecal route often have to be compounded specially by a pharmacist or technician because they cannot contain any preservative or other potentially harmful inactive ingredients that are sometimes found in standard injectable drug preparations.

Intrathecal pseudodelivery is a particular method of intrathecal administration, whereby the drug is encapsulated in a porous capsule that is placed in communication with the CSF. In this method, the drug is not released into the CSF. Instead, the CSF is in communication with the capsule through its porous walls, allowing the drug to interact with its target within the capsule itself. This allows for localized treatment while avoiding systemic distribution of the drug, potentially reducing side effects and enhancing the therapeutic efficacy for conditions affecting the central nervous system.

The route of administration is sometimes simply referred to as "intrathecal"; however, the term is also an adjective that refers to something occurring in or introduced into the anatomic space or potential space inside a sheath, most commonly the arachnoid membrane of the brain or spinal cord (under which is the subarachnoid space). For example, intrathecal immunoglobulin production is production of antibodies in the spinal cord. The abbreviation "IT" is best not used; instead, "intrathecal" is spelled out to avoid medical mistakes.

== Applications of intrathecal administration ==
=== Pain treatment ===
==== Anaesthetics/analgesics ====
Intrathecal administration of drugs for anaesthesia or analgesia can be utilized in the form of single-dose or continuous via catheter with external or internal pump depending on indication and duration needed. Usually a combination of a local anesthetic and one or more adjuvant drugs are used.

==== Alpha-adrenergic agonists ====
Intrathecal clonidine or dexmedetomidine can be used to prolong duration of anaesthesia and analgesia but comes with increased risk of hypotension.

==== Opioids ====
Lipophilic opioids such as fentanyl and sufentanil can be administered intrathecally for short duration of anaesthesia and analgesia.

Hydrophilic opioids such as morphine, diamorphine and hydromorphone can be administered intrathecally for longer duration of analgesia, up to 24 hours.

Pethidine has the unusual property of being both a local anaesthetic and opioid analgesic, which occasionally permits its use as the sole intrathecal anaesthetic agent.

Caution should be exercised with intrathecal opioids due to the risk of hypoventilation. Hydrophilic opioids come with a dose-dependent risk of late onset hypoventilation, however, low-dose intrathecal hydrophilic opioids have similar risk for hypoventilation as systemic opioids. Other adverse effects of intrathecal opioids include nausea and vomiting, pruritus and urinary retention.

==== Atypical analgesic agents ====
Ziconotide.

=== Antifungals ===
Amphotericin B is administered intrathecally to treat fungal infections involving the central nervous system infections.

=== Cancer chemotherapy ===
Currently, only four agents are licensed for intrathecal cancer chemotherapy: methotrexate, cytarabine, hydrocortisone, and thiotepa.

Administration of any vinca alkaloids, especially vincristine, via the intrathecal route is nearly always fatal.

=== Baclofen ===
Often reserved for spastic cerebral palsy, baclofen can be administered through an intrathecal pump implanted just below the skin of the abdomen or behind the chest wall, with a catheter connected directly to the base of the spine. Intrathecal baclofen pumps sometimes carry serious clinical risks, such as infection or a possibly fatal sudden malfunction.

=== Antisense therapy ===
Intrathecal administration of antisense oligonucleotides. Neurodegenerative diseases that are a result of a single mutant protein are good targets for antisense oligonucleotide therapies because of their ability to target and modify very specific sequences of RNA with high selectivity. Treatment of spinal muscular atrophy with Nusinersen is an example.

=== Mesenchymal Stem Cell Therapy ===
Treatment of chronic spinal injuries via the administration of mesenchymal stem cells, either from adipose tissue or bone marrow, is experimental, with better results from the former method. Introduction of mesenchymal stem cells promote the microenvironment needed for axonal regrowth and reduction of inflammation caused by astrocytes proliferation and glial scar tissue.

Animal models have shown improved motor control under the site of injury. A clinical trial also showed statistically significant improved sensitivity under the site of injury in patients.

== See also ==
- Cancer pain/Interventional/Intrathecal pump
- History of neuraxial anesthesia
- Intrathecal pump
- Theca
- Thecal sac
- Lumbar puncture
