= Epidural administration =

Medication injected into the epidural space of the spine

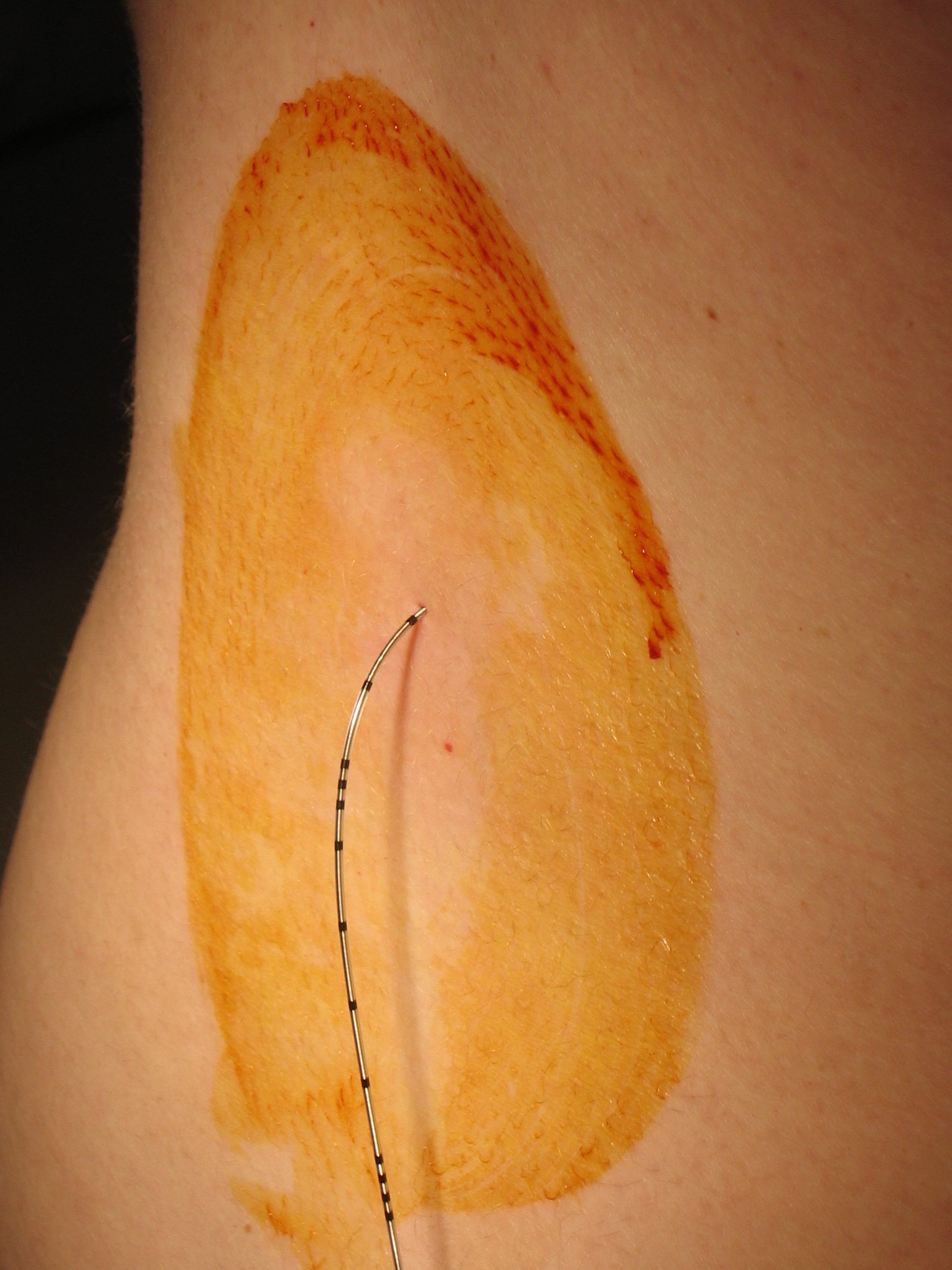
- A freshly inserted lumbar epidural catheter. The site has been prepared with tincture of iodine, and the dressing has not yet been applied. Depth markings may be seen along the shaft of the catheter.
- ICD-9-CM: 03.90
- MeSH: D000767
- OPS-301 code: 8-910

Epidural administration (from Ancient Greek ἐπί, "upon" + dura mater) is a method of medication administration in which a medicine is injected into the epidural space around the spinal cord. The epidural route is used by physicians and nurse anesthetists to administer local anesthetic agents, analgesics, diagnostic medicines such as radiocontrast agents, and other medicines such as glucocorticoids. Epidural administration involves the placement of a catheter into the epidural space, which may remain in place for the duration of the treatment. The technique of intentional epidural administration of medication was first described in 1921 by the Spanish Aragonese military surgeon Fidel Pagés.

Epidural anaesthesia causes a loss of sensation, including pain, by blocking the transmission of signals through nerve fibres in or near the spinal cord. For this reason, epidurals are commonly used for pain control during childbirth and surgery, for which the technique is considered safe and effective, and is considered more effective and safer than giving pain medication by mouth or through an intravenous line. An epidural injection may also be used to administer steroids for the treatment of inflammatory conditions of the spinal cord. It is not recommended for people with severe bleeding disorders, low platelet counts, or infections near the intended injection site. Severe complications from epidural administration are rare, but can include problems resulting from improper administration, as well as adverse effects from medicine. The most common complications of epidural injections include bleeding problems, headaches, and inadequate pain control. Epidural analgesia during childbirth may also impact the mother's ability to move during labor. Very large doses of anesthetics or analgesics may result in respiratory depression.

An epidural injection may be administered at any point of the spine, but most commonly the lumbar spine, below the end of the spinal cord. The specific administration site determines the specific nerves affected, and thus the area of the body from which pain will be blocked. Insertion of an epidural catheter consists of threading a needle between bones and ligaments to reach the epidural space without going so far as to puncture the dura mater. Saline or air may be used to confirm placement in the epidural space. Alternatively, direct imaging of the injection area may be performed with a portable ultrasound or fluoroscopy to confirm correct placement. Once placed, medication may be administered in one or more single doses, or may be continually infused over a period of time. When placed properly, an epidural catheter may remain inserted for several days, but is usually removed when it is possible to use less invasive administration methods (such as oral medication).

== Uses ==
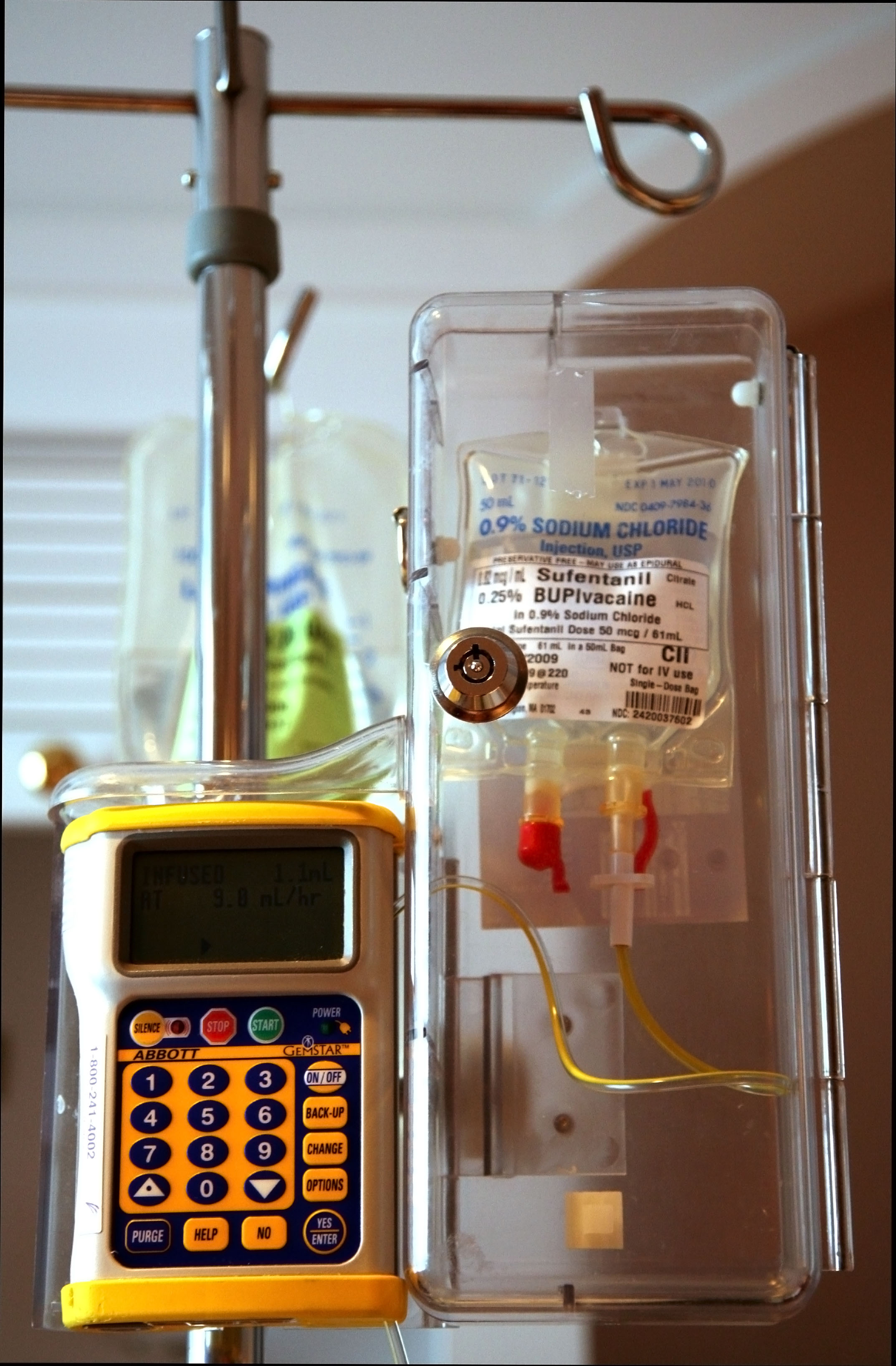
Epidural infusion pump with opioid (sufentanil) and anesthetic (bupivacaine) in a locked box

=== Pain relief during childbirth ===
Epidural injections are commonly used to provide pain relief (analgesia) during childbirth. This usually involves epidural injection of a local anesthetic and opioids, commonly called an "epidural". This is more effective than oral or intravenous (IV) opioids and other common modalities of analgesia in childbirth. After an epidural is administered, the recipient may not feel pain, but may still feel pressure. Epidural clonidine is rarely used but has been extensively studied for management of analgesia during labor.

Epidural analgesia is considered a safer and more effective method of relieving pain in labor as compared to intravenous or oral analgesia. In a 2018 Cochrane review of studies which compared epidural analgesia with oral opioids, some advantages of epidural analgesia versus opioids included fewer instances of naloxone use in newborns, and decreased risk of maternal hyperventilation. Some disadvantages of epidural analgesia versus opioids included longer labor durations, an increased need for oxytocin to stimulate uterine contractions, and an increased risk of fever, low blood pressure, and muscle weakness.

However, the review found no difference in overall Caesarean delivery rates between epidural analgesia versus no analgesia. Additionally, there was no difference found on the immediate neonatal health of the child between epidural analgesia versus no analgesia. Furthermore, the occurrence of long-term backache was unchanged after epidural use. Complications of epidural analgesia are rare, but may include headaches, dizziness, difficulty breathing and seizures for the mother. The child may experience a slow heartbeat, decreased ability to regulate temperature, and potential exposure to the drugs administered to the mother.

There is no overall difference in outcomes based on the time the epidural is administered to the mother, specifically no change in the rate of caesarean section, birth which must be assisted by instruments, and duration of labor. There is also no change in the Apgar score of the newborn between early and late epidural administration. Epidurals other than low-dose ambulatory epidurals also impact the ability of the mother to move during labor. Movement such as walking or changing positions may help improve labor comfort and decrease the risk of complications.

=== Pain relief during other surgery ===
Epidural analgesia has been demonstrated to have several benefits after other surgeries, including decreasing the need for the use of oral or systemic opioids, and reducing the risk of postoperative respiratory problems, chest infections, blood transfusion requirements, and myocardial infarctions. Use of epidural analgesia after surgery in place of systemic analgesia is less likely to decrease intestinal motility which would occur with systemic opioid therapy through blockade of the sympathetic nervous system. Some surgeries that spinal analgesia may be used in include lower abdominal surgery, lower limb surgery, cardiac surgery, and perineal surgery.

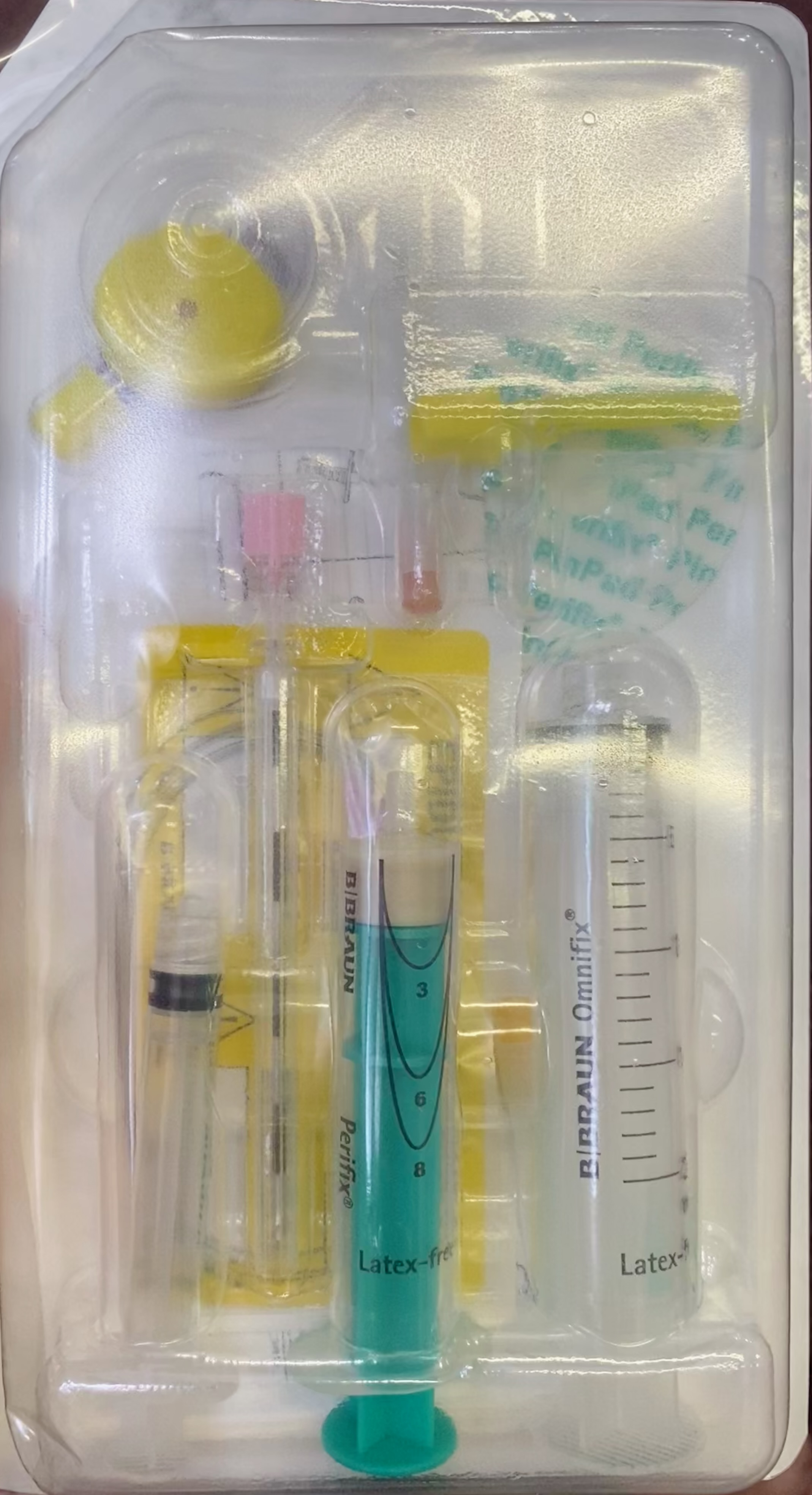
A single-use epidural administration kit in sterile packaging

=== Others ===
The injection of steroids into the epidural space is sometimes used to treat nerve root pain, radicular pain and inflammation caused by conditions such as spinal disc herniation, degenerative disc disease, and spinal stenosis. The risk of complications from steroid administration is low and complications are usually minor. The specific drug, dose, and frequency of administration impacts the risk for and severity of complications. Complications of epidural steroid administration are similar to the side effects of steroids administered in other manners, and can include higher than normal blood sugar, especially in patients with type 2 diabetes. An epidural blood patch consists of a small amount of a person's own blood is injected into the epidural space. This is done as a method of sealing a hole or leak in the epidural. The injected blood clots at the site of the puncture, closes the leak, and modulates CSF pressure. This may be used to treat post-dural-puncture headache and leakage of cerebrospinal fluid due to dural puncture, which occurs in approximately 1.5% of epidural analgesia procedures.

== Contraindications ==
The use of epidural analgesia and anesthetic is considered safe and effective in most situations. Epidural analgesia is contraindicated in people who have complications such as cellulitis near the injection site or severe coagulopathy. In some cases, it may be contraindicated in people with low platelets, increased intracranial pressure, or decreased cardiac output. Due to the risk of disease progression, it is also potentially contraindicated in people with preexisting progressive neurologic disease. Some heart conditions such as stenosis of the aortic or mitral valves are also a contraindication to the use of epidural administration, as is low blood pressure or hypovolemia. An epidural is generally not used in people who are being administered anticoagulation therapy as it increases the risk of complications from the epidural.

== Risks and complications ==
In addition to blocking nerves which carry pain signals, local anesthetics may block nerves which carry other signals, though sensory nerve fibers are more sensitive to the effects of the local anesthetics than motor nerve fibers. For this reason, adequate pain control can usually be attained without blocking the motor neurons, which would cause a loss of muscle control if it occurred. Depending on the drug and dose administered, the effects may last only a few minutes or up to several hours. As such, an epidural can provide pain control without as much of an effect on muscle strength. For example, a woman in labor who is being administered continuous analgesia via an epidural may not have impairment to her ability to move. Larger doses of medication are more likely to result in side effects. Very large doses of some medications can cause paralysis of the intercostal muscles and thoracic diaphragm responsible for breathing, which may lead to respiratory depression or arrest. It may also result in loss of sympathetic nerve input to the heart, which may cause a significant decrease in heart rate and blood pressure. Obese people, those who have given birth prior, those with a history of opiate use, or those with cervical dilation of more than 7 cm are at a higher risk of inadequate pain control.

If the dura is accidentally punctured during administration, it may cause cerebrospinal fluid to leak into the epidural space, causing a post-dural-puncture headache. This occurs in approximately 1 in 100 epidural procedures. Such a headache may be severe and last several days, or rarely weeks to months, and is caused by a reduction in CSF pressure. Mild post-dural-puncture headaches may be treated with caffeine and gabapentin, while severe headaches may be treated with an epidural blood patch, though most cases resolve spontaneously with time. Less common but more severe complications include subdural hematoma and cerebral venous thrombosis. The epidural catheter may also rarely be inadvertently placed in the subarachnoid space, which occurs in less than 1 in 1000 procedures. If this occurs, cerebrospinal fluid can be freely aspirated from the catheter, and this is used to detect misplacement. When this occurs, the catheter is withdrawn and replaced elsewhere, though occasionally no fluid may be aspirated despite a dural puncture. If dural puncture is not recognized, large doses of anesthetic may be delivered directly into the cerebrospinal fluid. This may result in a high block, or, more rarely, a total spinal, where anesthetic is delivered directly to the brainstem, causing unconsciousness and sometimes seizures.

Epidural administrations can also cause bleeding issues, including "bloody tap", which occurs in approximately 1 in 30–50 people. This occurs when epidural veins are inadvertently punctured with the needle during the insertion. It is a common occurrence and is not usually considered a problem in people who have normal blood clotting. Permanent neurological problems from bloody tap are extremely rare, estimated at less than 0.07% of occurrences. However, people who have a coagulopathy may have a risk of epidural hematoma, and those with thrombocytopenia might bleed more than expected. A 2018 Cochrane review found no evidence regarding the effect of platelet transfusions prior to a lumbar puncture or epidural anesthesia for participants that have thrombocytopenia. It is unclear whether major surgery-related bleeding within 24 hours and the surgery-related complications up to 7 days after the procedure are affected by epidural use.

Rare complications of epidural administration include formation of an epidural abscess (1 in 145,000) or epidural hematoma (1 in 168,000), neurological injury lasting longer than 1 year (1 in 240,000), paraplegia (1 in 250,000), and arachnoiditis. Rarely, an epidural may cause death (1 in 100,000). In circumstances where contraindications exist, there are numerous fascial plane blocks that may be provided instead of an epidural.

=== Medication-specific ===
If bupivacaine, a medication commonly administered via epidural, is inadvertently administered into a vein, it can cause excitation, nervousness, tingling around the mouth, tinnitus, tremor, dizziness, blurred vision, or seizures as well as central nervous system depression, loss of consciousness, respiratory depression and apnea. Bupivacaine intended for epidural administration has been implicated in cardiac arrests resulting in death when accidentally administered into a vein instead of the epidural space. The administration of large doses of opioids into the epidural space may cause itching and respiratory depression. The sensation of needing to urinate is often significantly diminished or completely absent after administration of epidural local anesthetics or opioids. Because of this, a urinary catheter is often placed for the duration of the epidural infusion.

In many women given epidural analgesia during labor oxytocin is also used to augment uterine contractions. In one study which examined the rate of breastfeeding two days following epidural anesthesia during childbirth, epidural analgesia used in combination with oxytocin resulted in lower maternal oxytocin and prolactin levels in response to breastfeeding on the second day following birth. The lower maternal oxytocin level negatively affects the baby's feeding rooting reflex, decreasing the amount of milk produced. The consequence of these effects from epidural analgesia is higher weight loss.

== Technique ==
=== Anatomy ===
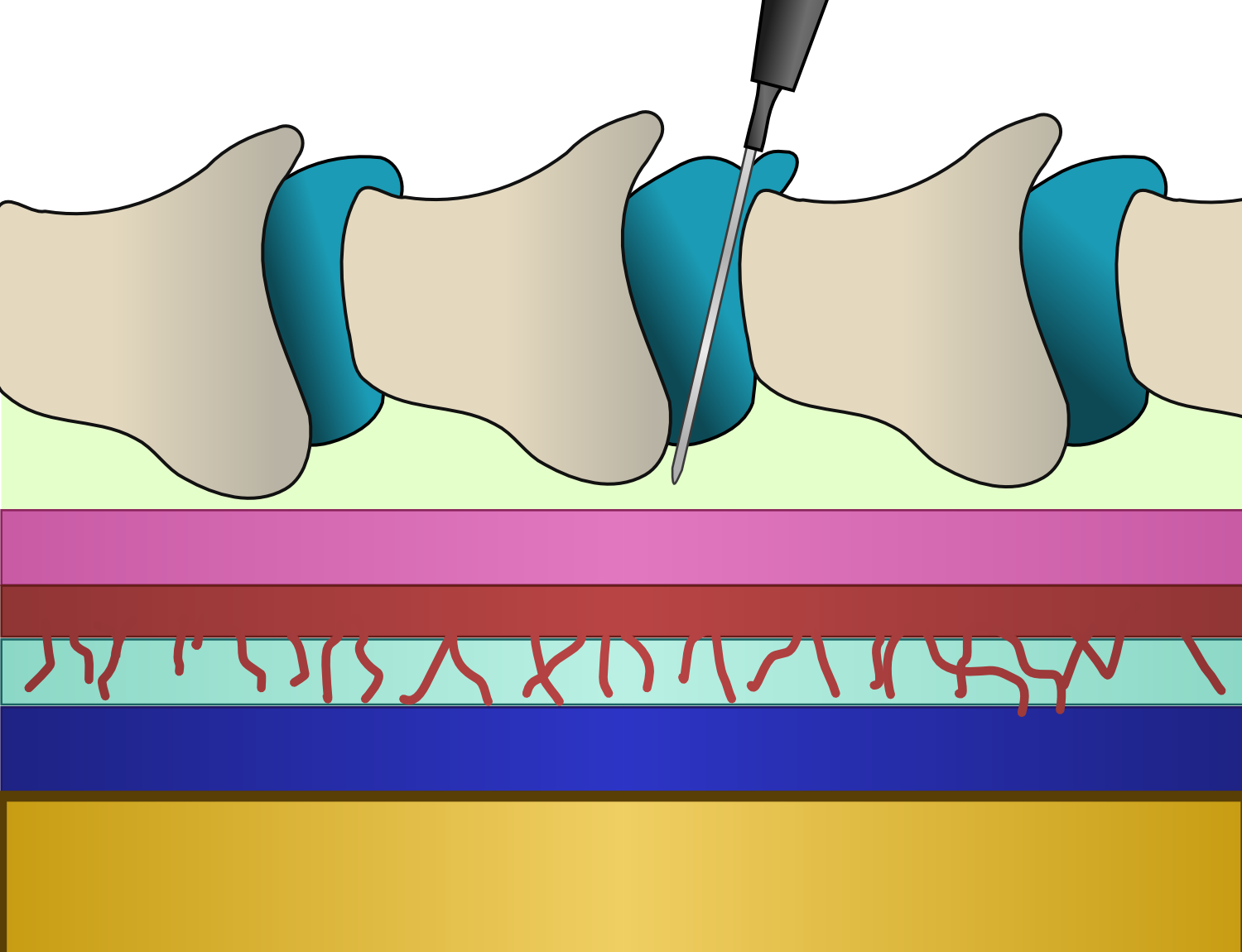
Sagittal section of the spinal column (not drawn to scale). Yellow: spinal cord; blue: pia mater; light blue: subarachnoid space; red: arachnoid; pink: dura mater; pale green: epidural space; taupe: vertebral bones; teal: interspinous ligaments.

An epidural is injected into the epidural space, inside the bony spinal canal but just outside the dura. In contact with the inner surface of the dura is another membrane called the arachnoid mater, which contains the cerebrospinal fluid. In adults, the spinal cord terminates around the level of the disc between L1 and L2, while in neonates it extends to L3 but can reach as low as L4. Below the spinal cord there is a bundle of nerves known as the cauda equina or "horse's tail". Hence, lumbar epidural injections carry a low risk of injuring the spinal cord. Insertion of an epidural needle involves threading a needle between the bones, through the ligaments and into the epidural space without puncturing the layer immediately below containing CSF under pressure.

=== Insertion ===
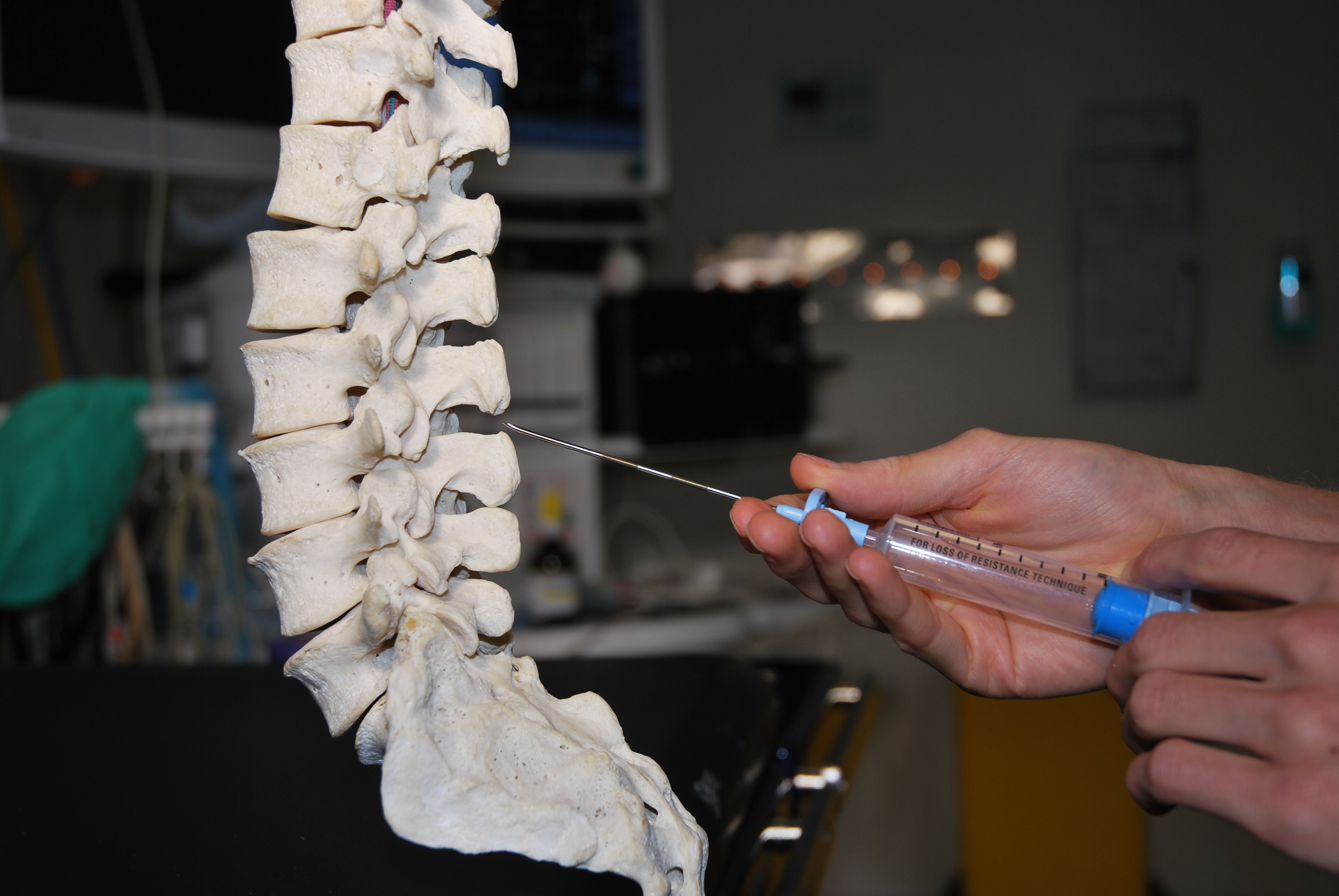
Simulation of the insertion of an epidural needle between the spinous processes of the lumbar vertebrae. A syringe is connected to the epidural needle and the epidural space is identified by a technique to assess loss of resistance.

Epidural administration is a procedure which requires the person performing the insertion to be technically proficient in order to avoid complications. Proficiency may be trained using bananas or other fruits as a model.

The person receiving the epidural may be seated, or lying on their side or stomach. The level of the spine at which the catheter is placed depends mainly on the site of intended operation – based on the location of the pain. The iliac crest is a commonly used anatomical landmark for lumbar epidural injections, as this level roughly corresponds with the fourth lumbar vertebra, which is usually well below the termination of the spinal cord. The Tuohy needle, designed with a 90-degree curved tip and side hole to redirect the inserted catheter vertically along the axis of the spine, may be inserted in the midline, between the spinous processes. When using a paramedian approach, the tip of the needle passes along a shelf of vertebral bone called the lamina until just before reaching the ligamentum flavum and the epidural space.

Along with a sudden loss of resistance to pressure on the plunger of the syringe, a slight clicking sensation may be felt by the operator as the tip of the needle breaches the ligamentum flavum and enters the epidural space. Saline or air may be used to identify placement in the epidural space. A systematic review from 2014 showed no difference in terms of safety or efficacy between the use of saline and air for this purpose. In addition to the loss of resistance technique, direct imaging of the placement may be used. This may be conducted with a portable ultrasound scanner or fluoroscopy (moving X-ray pictures). After placement of the tip of the needle, a catheter or small tube is threaded through the needle into the epidural space. The needle is then withdrawn over the catheter. The catheter is generally inserted 4–6 cm into the epidural space, and is typically secured to the skin with adhesive tape, similar to an intravenous line.

=== Use and removal ===
If a short duration of action is desired, a single dose of medication called a bolus may be administered. Thereafter, this bolus may be repeated if necessary provided the catheter remains undisturbed. For a prolonged effect, a continuous infusion of medication may be used. There is some evidence that an automated intermittent bolus technique may provide better pain control than a continuous infusion technique even when the total doses administered are identical. Typically, the effects of the epidural block are noted below a specific level or portion of the body, determined by the site of injection. A higher injection may result in sparing of nerve function in the lower spinal nerves. For example, a thoracic epidural performed for upper abdominal surgery may not have any effect on the area surrounding the genitals or pelvic organs.

=== Combined spinal-epidural techniques ===
For some procedures where both the rapid onset of a spinal anesthetic and the post-operative analgesic effects of an epidural are desired, both techniques may be used in combination. This is called combined spinal and epidural anesthesia (CSE). The spinal anesthetic may be administered in one location, and the epidural at an adjacent location. Alternatively, after locating the epidural space with the Tuohy needle, a spinal needle may be inserted through the Tuohy needle into the subarachnoid space. The spinal dose is then given, the spinal needle withdrawn, and the epidural catheter inserted as normal. This method, known as the "needle-through-needle" technique, may be associated with a slightly higher risk of placing the catheter into the subarachnoid space.

== Recovery ==
Epidural analgesia is generally well tolerated, with recovery time quick after administration is complete and the epidural is removed. The epidural catheter is usually removed when it is possible to safely switch to oral administration of medications, though catheters can safely remain in place for several days with little risk of bacterial infection, particularly if the skin is prepared with a chlorhexidine solution. Subcutaneously tunneled epidural catheters may be safely left in place for longer periods, with a low risk of infection or other complications. Regardless of the length of use, the effects of a medicine administered epidurally, including numbness if used for analgesia, usually wear off within a few hours of the epidural being stopped, with full recovery of normal function within 24 hours.

The use of epidural analgesia during a birth does not have any effect on whether a caesarean section must be performed during future births. Epidural analgesia during childbirth also generally has no negative effects on the long-term health of the mother or child. Use of epidural analgesia versus oral analgesia or no analgesia has no effect on the normal length of hospital stay after childbirth, the only difference being that care must be performed around the epidural insertion site to prevent infection. Following epidural analgesia used for gastrointestinal surgery, the time to recovery of normal gastrointestinal function is not significantly different from recovery time after intravenous analgesia. The use of epidural analgesia during cardiac surgeries may shorten the amount of time a person requires ventilator support following surgery, but it is unknown whether it shortens the overall post-surgery hospital stay overall.

== History ==
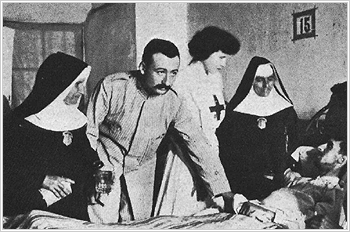
Spanish doctor Fidel Pagés visiting injured soldiers at the Docker Hospital in Melilla in 1909

The first record of an epidural injection is from 1885, when American neurologist James Corning of Acorn Hall in Morristown, New Jersey, used the technique to perform a neuraxial blockade. Corning inadvertently injected 111 mg of cocaine into the epidural space of a healthy male volunteer, although at the time he believed he was injecting it into the subarachnoid space. Following this, in 1901 Fernand Cathelin first reported intentionally blocking the lowest sacral and coccygeal nerves through the epidural space by injecting local anesthetic through the sacral hiatus. The loss of resistance technique was first described by Achile Dogliotti in 1933, following which Alberto Gutiérrez described the hanging drop technique. Both techniques are now used to identify when the needle has correctly been placed in the epidural space.

In 1921 Fidel Pagés, a military surgeon from Spain, developed the technique of "single-shot" lumbar epidural anesthesia, which was later popularized by Italian surgeon Achille Mario Dogliotti. Later, in 1931 Eugen Aburel described using a continuous epidural catheter for pain relief during childbirth. In 1941, Robert Hingson and Waldo Edwards recorded the use of continuous caudal anesthesia using an indwelling needle, following which they described the use of a flexible catheter for continuous caudal anesthesia in a woman in labor in 1942. In 1947, Manuel Curbelo described placement of a lumbar epidural catheter, and in 1979, Behar reported the first use of an epidural to administer narcotics.

== Society and culture ==
Some people continue to be concerned that women who are administered epidural analgesia during labor are more likely to require a cesarean delivery, based on older observational studies. However, evidence has shown that the use of epidural analgesia during labor does not have any statistically significant effect on the necessity to perform a cesarean delivery. A 2018 Cochrane review found no increase in the rate of Caesarean delivery when epidural analgesia was employed. However, epidural analgesia does lengthen the second stage of labor by 15 to 30 minutes, which may increase the risk that a delivery must be assisted by instruments.

In the United States in 1998, it was reported that over half of childbirths involved the use of epidural analgesia, and by 2008 this had increased to 61% of births. In the United Kingdom, epidurals have been offered through the National Health Service for all women during childbirth since 1980. By 1998, epidural analgesia was used in the UK for almost 25% of childbirths. In Japan, most childbirths take place in primary or secondary hospitals in which epidural analgesia is not offered.

In some developed countries, over 70% of childbirths involve epidural analgesia. Other studies have shown that minority women and immigrants are less likely to receive epidural analgesia during childbirth. Even in countries with universal healthcare coverage such as Canada, socioeconomic factors such as race, financial stability, and education influence the rate at which women receive epidural analgesia. One survey in 2014 found that over half of pregnant women in a Nigerian antenatal clinic (79.5%) did not know what epidural analgesia was or what it was used for, while 76.5% of them would utilize epidural analgesia if offered after it was explained to them.
