= List of local anesthetics =

This is a list of local anesthetic agents. Not all of these drugs are still used in clinical practice and in research. Some are primarily of historical interest.

| Drug | Other common names | Image | First synthesis | Dates of clinical use | Chemical/structural class | Duration of effect |
|---|---|---|---|---|---|---|
| amylocaine | Stovaine | | 1904 (Ernest Fourneau) | | ester- benzoic | |
| ambucaine | | | | | diester - aminosalicylic | |
| articaine | Astracaine, Septanest, Septocaine, Ultracaine, Zorcaine | | | | Amide | |
| benzocaine | Anbesol, Orajel | | | | Ester - Aminobenzoic | Short |
| benzonatate | Tessalon | | | | | |
| bupivacaine | Marcaine, Sensorcaine, Vivacaine | | 1957 (Ekenstam) | 1963 (Widman and Telivuo) | Amide | Moderate |
| butacaine | | | | | ester- aminobenzoic | |
| butanilicaine | | | | | Amide | |
| chloroprocaine | Nesacaine | | | | Ester - Aminobenzoic | |
| cinchocaine (INN) | dibucaine (USAN), Cincain, Cinchocaine, Nupercainal, Nupercaine, Sovcaine | | 1925 (Meischer) | 1930 (Uhlmann) | Ester - Aminobenzoic | |
| cocaine | | | 1855 (first isolation by Friedrich Gaedcke), 1898 (first synthesis by Richard Willstätter) | 1884 (Karl Koller, William Stewart Halsted) | Ester - Benzoic | |
| cyclomethycaine | | | | | Ester - hydroxybenzoic | |
| dibucaine | | | | | Amide | |
| diperodon | | | | | | |
| dimethocaine | larocaine | | | | | |
| eucaine | α-Eucaine, β-eucaine | α-eucaine / β-eucaine | 1900. α β | | | |
| etidocaine | Duranest | | 1971 (Takman) | 1972 (Lund) | | |
| hexylcaine | Cyclaine, Osmocaine | | | | | |
| fomocaine | | | | | ester - phenyl | |
| fotocaine | | | | | | |
| hydroxyprocaine | | | | | ester - aminosalicylic | |
| isobucaine | | | | | Ester - benzoic | |
| levobupivacaine | Chirocaine | | 1990s (Mather and Tucker) | 1995 | | |
| lidocaine (lignocaine) | Xylocaine | | 1943 (Nils Löfgren and Bengt Lundqvist) | 1947 (Torsten Gordh) | | |
| mepivacaine | Carbocaine, Polocaine | | 1956 (Ekenstam and Egner) | 1957 (Dhuner) | | |
| meprylcaine | Epirocain | | | | | |
| metabutoxycaine | | | | | | |
| nitracaine | | | | | Ester- Aminobenzoic | |
| orthocaine | | | | | | |
| oxetacaine (oxethazaine) | | | | | | |
| oxybuprocaine | benoxinate, Novesine | | | | | |
| Paraethoxycaine | | | | | | |
| phenacaine | Holocaine | | | | | |
| piperocaine | metycaine | | | | | |
| piridocaine | | | | | | |
| pramocaine | pramoxine | | | | | |
| prilocaine | Citanest | | 1959 (Nils Löfgren and Egner) | 1960 (Wielding) | | |
| Primacaine | | | | | | |
| procaine | Novocain, borocaine (procaine borate), ethocaine | | 1904 (Alfred Einhorn) | 1905 (Heinrich Braun) | | |
| procainamide | | | | | | |
| proparacaine | proxymetacaine | | | | | |
| propoxycaine | | | | | | |
| Pyrrocaine | | | | | | |
| quinisocaine (INN) | dimethisoquin (USAN) | | | | | |
| ropivacaine | Naropin | | 1957 (Ekenstam) | 1997 | | |
| trimecaine | Mesdicain, Mesocain, Mesokain | | | | | |
| tetracaine | amethocaine, Dicaine, Pontocaine | | 1928 (O. Eisleb) | 1931 | | |
| Tolycaine | | | | | | |
| Tropacocaine | | | | | | |

== See also ==
- 4-Aminobenzoic acid
- Amino amide
- Amino esters
- Anesthesia
- Anesthetic
- Brachial plexus block
- Cocaine analogues: local anesthetics
- Dental anesthesia
- Dibucaine number
- Epidural
- Intravenous regional anesthesia
- Local anesthesia
- Local anesthetic with vasoconstrictor
- Local anesthetic toxicity
- Methemoglobin
- Sodium channel blocker
- Spinal anesthesia
- Topical anesthesia
- Veterinary anesthesia
