= Articaine =

Chemical compound

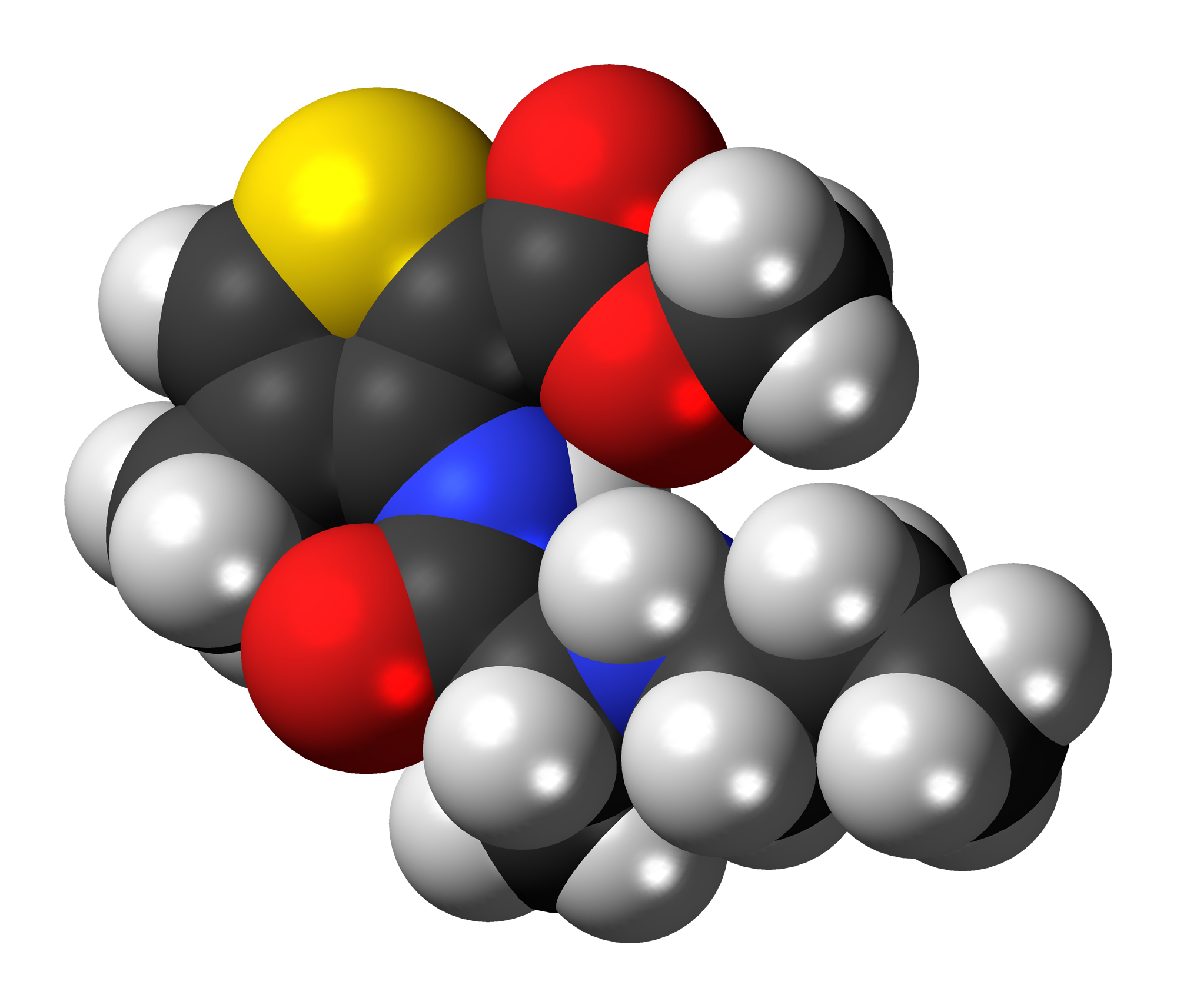

Clinical data
- Other names: Carticaine
- AHFS/Drugs.com: Monograph
- License data: US DailyMed: Articaine
- Routes of administration: Subcutaneous, submucosal, parenteral, epidural, intravenous, eye drop
- ATC code: N01BB08 (WHO) N01BB58 (WHO)

Legal status
- Legal status: US: ℞-only

Pharmacokinetic data
- Metabolism: Liver, plasma
- Elimination half-life: 30 min
- Excretion: Liver and unspecific plasma estearases

Identifiers
- IUPAC name: (RS)-Methyl 4-methyl-3-(2-propylaminopropanoylamino)thiophene-2-carboxylate
- CAS Number: 23964-58-1; HCl: 23964-57-0
- PubChem CID: 32170; HCl: 32169
- DrugBank: DB09009
- ChemSpider: 29837
- UNII: D3SQ406G9X; HCl: QS9014Q792
- KEGG: D07468
- ChEMBL: ChEMBL1093
- CompTox Dashboard (EPA): DTXSID7048536
- ECHA InfoCard: 100.115.711

Chemical and physical data
- Formula: C_{13}H_{20}N_{2}O_{3}S
- Molar mass: 284.37 g·mol^{−1}
- 3D model (JSmol): Interactive image
- Chirality: Racemic mixture
- SMILES: O=C(Nc1c(scc1C)C(=O)OC)C(NCCC)C
- InChI: InChI=1S/C13H20N2O3S/c1-5-6-14-9(3)12(16)15-10-8(2)7-19-11(10)13(17)18-4/h7,9,14H,5-6H2,1-4H3,(H,15,16); Key:QTGIAADRBBLJGA-UHFFFAOYSA-N

Articaine is a dental amide-type local anesthetic. It is the most widely used local anesthetic in a number of European countries and is available in many countries. It is the only local anaesthetic to contain a thiophene ring, meaning it can be described as 'thiophenic'; this conveys lipid solubility.

== Medical uses ==
Articaine is used for pain control. Articaine causes a transient and completely reversible state of anesthesia (loss of sensation) during (dental) procedures.

Articaine (as Cyklx) is indicated for ocular surface anesthesia prior to ocular procedures and/or intraocular injections.

In dentistry, articaine is used mainly for infiltration injections. Articaine, while not proven, has been associated with higher risk of nerve damage when used as a block technique. However, articaine is able to penetrate dense cortical bone — as found in the lower jaw (mandible) — more than most other local anaesthetics.

In people with hypokalemic sensory overstimulation, lidocaine is not very effective, but articaine works well.

Studies comparing lidocaine and articaine found that articaine is more effective than lidocaine in anaesthetising the posterior first molar region. Articaine has been found to be 3.81 times more likely than lidocaine to produce successful anaesthesia when used for infiltration injections. However, there is no evidence to support the use of articaine over lidocaine for inferior alveolar nerve blocks. Furthermore, articaine has been demonstrated to be superior to lidocaine for use of supplementary infiltration following persistent pain despite a successful inferior dental nerve block with lidocaine.

A recent systematic review with meta-analysis has showed that buccal infiltration of articaine for mandibular first molars with symptomatic irreversible pulpitis can be employed effectively in clinical practice.

== Contraindications ==
- Allergy to amide-type anesthetics
- Allergy to metabisulfites
- Idiopathic or congenital methemoglobinemia (not a concern in dental practice due to the small volumes of articaine used)
- Hemoglobinopathy, such as sickle cell disease

Articaine is not contraindicated in people with sulfa allergies, as there is no cross-allergenicity between articaine's sulphur-bearing thiophene ring and sulfonamides.

Methylparaben is no longer present in any dental local anesthetic formula available in North America.

== Structure and metabolism ==
The amide structure of articaine is similar to that of other local anesthetics, but its molecular structure differs through the presence of a thiophene ring instead of a benzene ring. Articaine is exceptional because it contains an additional ester group that is metabolized by esterases in blood and tissue. The elimination of articaine is exponential with a half-life of 20 minutes. Since articaine is hydrolized very quickly in the blood, the risk of systemic intoxication seems to be lower than with other anesthetics, especially if repeated injection is performed.

== History ==
This drug was synthesized by pharmacologist Roman Muschaweck and chemist Robert Rippel. Muschaweck received a "O. Schmiedeberg" medal by the German Society for Experimental and Clinical Pharmacology and Toxicology for his work in 2002. It was brought to the German market in 1976 by Hoechst AG, a life-sciences German company (now Sanofi-Aventis), under the brand name Ultracain. This drug was also referred to as "carticaine" until 1984.

In 1983, it was brought into the North American market, to Canada, under the name Ultracaine for dental use, manufactured in Germany and distributed by Hoechst-Marion-Roussel. This brand is manufactured in Germany by Sanofi-Aventis and distributed in North America by Hansamed Limited (since 1999). After Ultracaine's patent protection expired, generic versions arrived to the Canadian market: (in order of appearance) Septanest (Septodont), Astracaine, (originally by AstraZeneca and now a Dentsply product), Zorcaine (Carestream Health/Kodak) and Orabloc (Pierrel).

It was approved by the FDA in April 2000, and became available in the United States two months later under the brand name Septocaine, an anesthetic/vasoconstrictor combination with Epinephrine 1:100,000 (brand name Septodont). Zorcaine became available there a few years later, also. Articadent (Dentsply) became available in the United States in October 2010. The three brands available in the United States are all manufactured for these companies by Novocol Pharmaceuticals Inc. (Canada). Ubistesin and Ubistesin Forte (3M ESPE) are also widely used in the United States and Europe. Orabloc (Pierrel) is aseptically manufactured and was approved by the FDA in 2010, became available in Canada in 2011, and in Europe from 2013.

== Society and culture ==
=== Paresthesia controversy ===
Paresthesia (pins and needles), a short-to-long-term numbness or altered sensation affecting a nerve, is a well-known complication of injectable local anesthetics and has been present even before articaine was available.

An article by Haas and Lennon published in 1993 seems to be the original source for the controversy surrounding articaine. This paper analyzed 143 cases reported in to the Royal College of Dental Surgeons of Ontario (RCDSO) over a 21-year period. The results from their analysis seemed to indicate that 4% local anesthetics had a higher incidence of causing paresthesia, an undesirable temporary or permanent complication, after the injection. The authors concluded that “...the overall incidence of paresthesia following local anesthetic administration for non-surgical procedures in dentistry in Ontario is very low, with only 14 cases being reported out of an estimated 11,000,000 injections in 1993. However if paresthesia does occur, the results of this study are consistent with the suggestion that it is significantly more likely to do so if either articaine or prilocaine is used.”

In another paper by the same authors, 19 reported paresthesia cases in Ontario for 1994 were reviewed, concluding that the incidence of paresthesia was 2.05 per million injections of 4% anesthetic drugs. Another follow up study by Miller and Haas published in 2000, concluded that the incidence of paresthesia from either prilocaine or articaine (the only two 4% drugs in the dental market) was close to 1:500,000 injections. (An average dentist gives around 1,800 injections in a year).

Almost all recorded cases of long-term numbness or altered sensation (paresthesia) seem only to be present when this anesthetic is used for dental use (no PubMed references for paresthesia with articaine for other medical specialties). Also, in the vast majority of the reports, only the lingual nerve was affected.

Nonetheless, direct damage to the nerve caused by 4% drugs has never been scientifically proven.

Some research points to needle trauma as the cause of the paresthesia events.

=== Brand names ===
Articaine is available for the North American dental market:

- In Canada:
  - As articaine hydrochloride 4% with epinephrine 1:100,000 (0,01 mg/ml)
    - Ubistesin Forte
    - Ultracaine DSF
    - Septanest SP
    - Astracaine Forte
    - Zorcaine
    - Orabloc (articaine hydrochloride 4% and epinephrine 1:100,000)
  - As articaine hydrochloride 4% with epinephrine 1:200,000 (0,005 mg/ml)
    - Ubistesin
    - Ultracaine DS
    - Septanest N
    - Astracaine
    - Orabloc (articaine hydrochloride 4% and epinephrine 1:200,000)
- In the US:
  - As articaine hydrochloride 4% with epinephrine 1:100,000
    - Septocaine with epinephrine 1:100,000
    - Zorcaine
    - Articadent with epinephrine 1:100,000
    - Orabloc (articaine hydrochloride 4% and epinephrine 1:100,000)
  - As articaine hydrochloride 4% with epinephrine 1:200,000
    - Septocaine with epinephrine 1:200,000
    - Articadent with epinephrine 1:200,000
    - Orabloc (articaine hydrochloride 4% and epinephrine 1:200,000)

An epinephrine-free (adrenaline-free) version is available in Europe under the brand name Ultracain D. However, version with epinephrine (adrenaline) is available in Europe under the brand name Supracain 4% with epinephrine concentration of 1:200,000.
