= Pyrrocaine =

Names
- Preferred IUPAC name N-(2,6-Dimethylphenyl)-2-(pyrrolidin-1-yl)acetamide

Identifiers
CAS Number	2210-77-7
3D model (JSmol)	Interactive image
ChEMBL	ChEMBL1895219
ChemSpider	22776
EC Number	218-642-7
KEGG	D05665
PubChem CID	24361
UNII	9D47L94CPW
CompTox Dashboard (EPA)	DTXSID9046150
- InChI: InChI=1S/C14H20N2O/c1-11-6-5-7-12(2)14(11)15-13(17)10-16-8-3-4-9-16/h5-7H,3-4,8-10H2,1-2H3,(H,15,17) Key: OYCGKECKIVYHTN-UHFFFAOYSA-N
- SMILES: Cc1cccc(c1NC(=O)CN2CCCC2)C

Properties
Chemical formula	C_{14}H_{20}N_{2}O
Molar mass	232.327
- Except where otherwise noted, data are given for materials in their standard state (at 25 °C [77 °F], 100 kPa). Infobox references

Pyrrocaine is a local anesthetic drug. The cogency of pyrrocaine is equivalent to lidocaine in blocking the motor nerve and sensory. Pyrrocaine was proven to be somewhat harmless compared to lidocaine. No signs of methemoglobinemia was found while observing. It was considered unsafe for acute porphyria treatment. No evidence is found that it is profitly used now.

== History ==
In the 1960s it was most of the time used as a nerve blocker dental anesthetic and dentists recommended it due to its fast commencement.

== Adverse effects ==
Pyrrocaine has very similar side effects on blood pressure and heart rate compared to lidocaine.

== Synthesis ==
Selfsame as lidocaine, albeit interposing pyrrolidine for diethylamine.

Synthesis: Patents:

Amide formation between 2,6-Dimethylaniline (1) and Chloroacetyl chloride (2) gives [1131-01-7] (3). Displacement of the remaining halogen by pyrrolidine (4) completed the synthesis of Pyrrocaine (5).

== See also ==
- Procaine
- Trimecaine
- Local anesthetic
- List of local anesthetics
