= RAC 421-II =

Anaesthetic drug

- 2-Dimensional structure of RAC 421-II

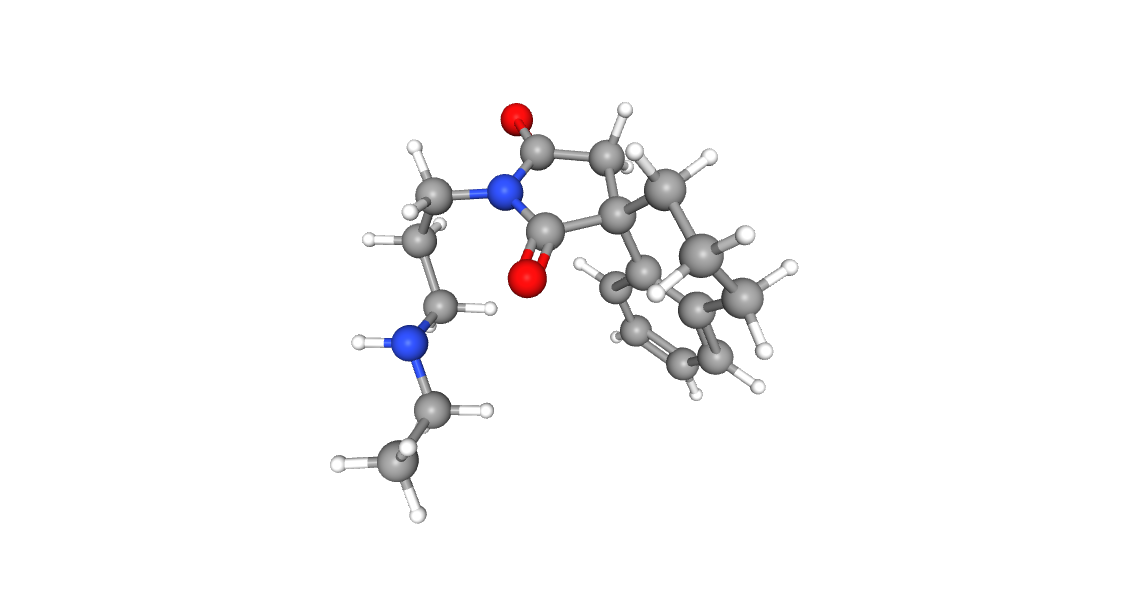
- 3-Dimensional structure of RAC 421-II

Identifiers
- IUPAC name: 1'-[3-(Ethylamino)propyl]spiro[2,3-dihydro-1H-naphthalene-4,3'-pyrrolidine]-2',5'-dione
- CAS Number: 139085-58-8; HCl: 17502-62-4
- PubChem CID: 173268; HCl: 173267
- ChemSpider: 151278; HCl: 151277
- CompTox Dashboard (EPA): DTXSID401336876

Chemical and physical data
- Formula: C_{18}H_{24}N_{2}O_{2}
- Molar mass: 300.402 g·mol^{−1}
- 3D model (JSmol): Interactive image
- SMILES: CCNCCCN1C(=O)CC2(C1=O)CCCC3=CC=CC=C23
- InChI: InChI=InChI=1S/C18H24N2O2/c1-2-19-11-6-12-20-16(21)13-18(17(20)22)10-5-8-14-7-3-4-9-15(14)18/h3-4,7,9,19H,2,5-6,8,10-13H2,1H3; Key:NNCLGAIWSCXVEX-UHFFFAOYSA-N

RAC 421-II, also referred to simply as RAC 421, is a quaternary local anesthetic that acts through intracellular blockage of the NaKATPase channel.

== Function ==
As a quaternary ammonium analogue of another local anesthetic, RAC 109, RAC 421-II is permanently charged and so cannot cross the hydrophobic phospholipid cell membrane. As it cannot diffuse across the cell membrane, it cannot exert its inhibitory effects on the intracellular surface of NaKATPase. As such, it can only exert its anesthetic properties if it is injected into the cytosol of the nerve fibre. Inhibition occurs through allowing the sodium and potassium gradients across the cell membrane to dissipate. NaKATPase blockage preferentially inhibits firing of nociceptive nerve fibres due to their relatively low cell diameter and so low tolerance to NaKATPase inhibitors.

This is in contrast to non-quaternary anesthetics like benzocaine and tetracaine which cross the cell membrane in their uncharged states and so they can induce anesthetic effects upon application to the extracellular side of the membrane. They subsequently become charged and so activated within the cytosol to exert their inhibitory effects on NaKATPase (NaKATPase inhibiting anesthetics must be in their charged state to become active).
