= C16H26N2O3 =

The molecular formula C_{16}H_{26}N_{2}O_{3} (molar mass: 294.389 g/mol, exact mass: 294.1943 u) may refer to:

- Propoxycaine
- Proxymetacaine
