= C8H9NO3 =

The molecular formula C_{8}H_{9}NO_{3} (molar mass: 167.16 g/mol) may refer to:

- Glycin, a photographic developing agent
- 4-Hydroxyphenylglycine, an amino acid
- Orthocaine, an anesthetic
- Pyridoxal, one of the three natural forms of vitamin B_{6}
