= C14H20N2O2 =

The molecular formula C_{14}H_{20}N_{2}O_{2} (molar mass: 248.32 g/mol, exact mass: 248.1525 u) may refer to:

- Bunitrolol
- Pindolol
- Piridocaine
