= C17H28N2O3 =

The molecular formula C_{17}H_{28}N_{2}O_{3} (molar mass: 308.41 g/mol) may refer to:

- Metabutoxycaine
- Oxybuprocaine, also known as benoxinate
