= ATC code N01 =

ATC code N01 Anesthetics is a therapeutic subgroup of the Anatomical Therapeutic Chemical Classification System, a system of alphanumeric codes developed by the World Health Organization (WHO) for the classification of drugs and other medical products. Subgroup N01 is part of the anatomical group N Nervous system.

Codes for veterinary use (ATCvet codes) can be created by placing the letter Q in front of the human ATC code: for example, QN01. ATCvet codes without corresponding human ATC codes are cited with the leading Q in the following list.
National versions of the ATC classification may include additional codes not present in this list, which follows the WHO version.

== N01A Anesthetics, general ==
=== N01AA Ethers ===
N01AA01 Diethyl ether
N01AA02 Vinyl ether

=== N01AB Halogenated hydrocarbons ===
N01AB01 Halothane
N01AB02 Chloroform
N01AB04 Enflurane
N01AB05 Trichloroethylene
N01AB06 Isoflurane
N01AB07 Desflurane
N01AB08 Sevoflurane

=== N01AF Barbiturates, plain ===
N01AF01 Methohexital
N01AF02 Hexobarbital
N01AF03 Thiopental sodium

=== N01AG Barbiturates in combination with other drugs ===
N01AG01 Pronarcon

=== N01AH Opioid anesthetics ===
N01AH01 Fentanyl
N01AH02 Alfentanil
N01AH03 Sufentanil
N01AH04 Phenoperidine
N01AH05 Anileridine
N01AH06 Remifentanil
N01AH51 Fentanyl, combinations

=== N01AX Other general anesthetics ===
N01AX03 Ketamine
N01AX04 Propanidid
N01AX05 Alfaxalone
N01AX07 Etomidate
N01AX10 Propofol
N01AX11 Sodium oxybate
N01AX13 Nitrous oxide
N01AX14 Esketamine
N01AX15 Xenon
N01AX63 Nitrous oxide, combinations

== N01B Anesthetics, local ==
=== N01BA Esters of aminobenzoic acid ===
N01BA01 Metabutethamine
N01BA02 Procaine
N01BA03 Tetracaine
N01BA04 Chloroprocaine
N01BA05 Benzocaine
N01BA06 Oxybuprocaine
N01BA52 Procaine, combinations
N01BA53 Tetracaine, combinations

=== N01BB Amides ===
N01BB01 Bupivacaine
N01BB02 Lidocaine
N01BB03 Mepivacaine
N01BB04 Prilocaine
N01BB05 Butanilicaine
N01BB06 Cinchocaine
N01BB07 Etidocaine
N01BB08 Articaine
N01BB09 Ropivacaine
N01BB10 Levobupivacaine
N01BB20 Combinations
N01BB51 Bupivacaine, combinations
N01BB52 Lidocaine, combinations
N01BB53 Mepivacaine, combinations
N01BB54 Prilocaine, combinations
N01BB57 Etidocaine, combinations
N01BB58 Articaine, combinations
N01BB59 Bupivacaine and meloxicam

=== N01BC Esters of benzoic acid ===
N01BC01 Cocaine

=== N01BH Homeopathic and anthroposophical local anesthetic ===
N01BH20 Combinations

=== N01BX Other local anesthetics ===
N01BX01 Chloroethane
N01BX02 Dyclonine
N01BX03 Phenol
N01BX04 Capsaicin
N01BX05 Propipocaine
N01BX06 Diphenhydramine
N01BX50 Combinations
