= Butacaine =

Chemical compound

Names
- Preferred IUPAC name 3-(Dibutylamino)propyl 4-aminobenzoate

Identifiers
CAS Number	149-16-6
3D model (JSmol)	Interactive image
ChEMBL	ChEMBL129529
ChemSpider	2386
ECHA InfoCard	100.005.214
PubChem CID	2480
UNII	Z84S23CGJJ
CompTox Dashboard (EPA)	DTXSID3045300
- InChI: InChI=1/C18H30N2O2/c1-3-5-12-20(13-6-4-2)14-7-15-22-18(21)16-8-10-17(19)11-9-16/h8-11H,3-7,12-15,19H2,1-2H3 Key: HQFWVSGBVLEQGA-UHFFFAOYAZ
- SMILES: O=C(OCCCN(CCCC)CCCC)c1ccc(N)cc1

Properties
Chemical formula	C_{18}H_{30}N_{2}O_{2}
Molar mass	306.450 g·mol^{−1}
- Except where otherwise noted, data are given for materials in their standard state (at 25 °C [77 °F], 100 kPa). Infobox references

Butacaine is a white crystalline ester used as a local anesthetic. It was first marketed in the 1920s.

== Synthesis ==
The addition of metallic sodium to a mixture of allyl alcohol (1) and dibutylamine (2) gives the conjugate addition product 3-dibutylamino-1-propanol (3). Reaction of this intermediate with p-nitrobenzoyl chloride (4) gives the ester 5. A Béchamp reduction of the nitro group completes the synthesis of butacaine (6).

Synthesis of butacaine

== See also ==
- Isobucaine
