= Metabutethamine =

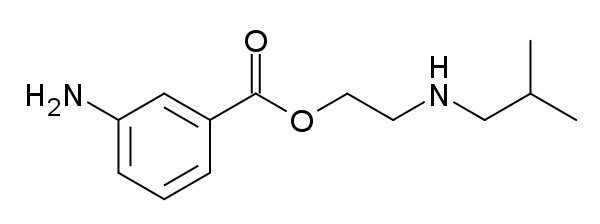

Names
- Preferred IUPAC name 2-[(2-Methylpropyl)amino]ethyl 3-aminobenzoate

Identifiers
CAS Number	4439-25-2
3D model (JSmol)	Interactive image
ChemSpider	10644
KEGG	C17723
PubChem CID	11115
UNII	PSJ9VIF3RV
CompTox Dashboard (EPA)	DTXSID60196150
- InChI: InChI=1S/C13H20N2O2/c1-10(2)9-15-6-7-17-13(16)11-4-3-5-12(14)8-11/h3-5,8,10,15H,6-7,9,14H2,1-2H3 Key: BXMFKNRZTLNAFY-UHFFFAOYSA-N
- SMILES: CC(C)CNCCOC(=O)C1=CC(=CC=C1)N

Properties
Chemical formula	C_{13}H_{20}N_{2}O_{2}
Molar mass	236.3101

Pharmacology
ATC code	N01BA01 (WHO)
- Except where otherwise noted, data are given for materials in their standard state (at 25 °C [77 °F], 100 kPa). verify (what is ?) Infobox references

Metabutethamine is a local anesthetic once used in dentistry.
