= Numby =

Numby may refer to:

- Numby, brand name for the medication Iontocaine
- Numby Numby, a sinkhole in Australia
