= Lidocaine/prilocaine =

Eutectic mixture of local anesthetics

Combination of
- Lidocaine: Local anesthetic
- Prilocaine: Local anesthetic

Clinical data
- Trade names: Emla, Fortacin, Senstend, others
- AHFS/Drugs.com: Micromedex Detailed Consumer Information
- License data: EU EMA: by INN; US DailyMed: Lidocaine_and_prilocaine
- Routes of administration: Topical
- ATC code: None

Legal status
- Legal status: UK: P (Pharmacy medicines); US: ℞-only; EU: Rx-only

Identifiers
- CAS Number: 101362-25-8
- PubChem CID: 9911821
- ChemSpider: 8087472
- KEGG: D02740
- CompTox Dashboard (EPA): DTXSID60893697

Lidocaine/prilocaine is a topical anesthetic which can be used to numb the skin for medical or cosmetic purposes; it is a eutectic mixture of equal quantities (by weight) of lidocaine and prilocaine.

A 5% emulsion preparation, containing 2.5% each of lidocaine/prilocaine, is marketed by APP Pharmaceuticals under the trade name EMLA (an abbreviation for Eutectic Mixture of Local Anesthetics). As a spray, it is marketed under the name Tempe (topical eutectic-like mixture for premature ejaculation) (PSD502) that can be used by men to help with premature ejaculation. The spray is manufactured by Plethora Solutions and branded as Fortacin in the UK and Recordati in the EU.

== Eutectic mixture ==
Separately, lidocaine and prilocaine are solid bases. When mixed in equal quantities by weight, however, they form a eutectic mixture – that is the melting point of the mixture is lower than the melting points of the individual components. The lidocaine/prilocaine eutectic mixture is an oil with a melting point of 18 °C, and can be formulated into preparations without the use of a non-aqueous solvent. This allows higher concentrations of anaesthetic to be formulated into the preparation and maintained during application.

== Clinical use ==
=== Indications ===
The lidocaine/prilocaine combination is indicated for dermal anaesthesia. Specifically it is applied to prevent pain associated with intravenous catheter insertion, blood sampling, superficial surgical procedures, and topical anaesthesia of leg ulcers for cleansing or debridement. Also, it can be used to numb the skin before tattooing as well as electrolysis and laser hair removal. It is also sometimes used in advance of injected local anaesthetics for minor surgery and biopsies.

A topical spray consisting of an aerosol formulation of lidocaine and prilocaine was evaluated under the name PSD502 for use in treating premature ejaculation. The spray is applied on the penile skin prior to intercourse. While this formulation was not approved by the FDA, a similar product, Promescent, is available over-the-counter in the U.S.

=== Dosage forms ===
Lidocaine/prilocaine eutectic mixture is marketed as a 5% oil-in-water emulsion incorporated in a cream base (EMLA cream) or a cellulose disk (EMLA patch). The cream is applied under an occlusive dressing, while the patch incorporates an occlusive dressing to facilitate absorption of lidocaine and prilocaine into the area where anaesthesia is required. Local dermal anaesthesia is achieved after approximately 60 minutes, whereupon the occlusive dressing (or patch) is removed. The duration of anaesthesia is approximately two hours following removal of the occlusive dressing.

E. Fougera & Co., makers of the generic cream widely used in the United States as Lidocaine and Prilocaine Cream, 2.5%/2.5%, recommends different timing for application of the cream as well as length of anesthesia. They state the cream must be applied at least one hour before the start of a routine procedure and for two hours before the start of a painful procedure. Additionally, they state that the duration of effective skin anesthesia will be at least one hour after removal of the occlusive dressing.

=== Circumcision ===
Lidocaine/prilocaine eutectic mixture has been used during circumcision in newborn boys and has been considered efficacious and safe to lessen pain from circumcision.

The European Medicines Agency concludes in its latest (2014) statement on Emla: "Safety and efficacy for the use of EMLA on genital skin and genital mucosa have not been established in children younger than 12 years. Available paediatric data do not demonstrate adequate efficacy for circumcision."

The Patient Information Leaflet of EMLA in the UK states: "EMLA Cream should not be applied to the genital skin (e.g. penis) and genital mucosa (e.g. in the vagina) of children (below 12 years of age) owing to insufficient data on absorption of active substances."

== Tempe ==
The spray is a combination of local anaesthetics lidocaine and prilocaine in a metered-dose aerosol that is sprayed directly on the penis to numb sensations. It was developed by the same group that invented the erectile dysfunction drug sildenafil. The drug was approved in Europe and was released in the UK market in November 2016 and within the EU will be marketed by, early in 2017 In the United States, the Food and Drug Administration (FDA) is expected to approve the drug in 2018.

== Compendial status ==
- United States Pharmacopeia 31

== See also ==
- Dosage form
- Eutectic point
- Lidocaine
- Prilocaine
