= Amino esters =

Class of chemical compounds

Amino esters are a class of local anesthetics. They are named for their ester bond and are unlike amide local anaesthetics.

== Structure ==
Structurally, amino esters consist of three molecular components:

- a lipophilic part (ester)
- an intermediate aliphatic chain
- a hydrophilic part (amine)

The chemical linkage between the lipophilic part and the intermediate chain can be of the amide-type or the ester-type, and is the general basis for the current classification of local anesthetics.

Amino esters, in reference to anesthetic agents, are rapidly metabolized in the plasma by butyrylcholinesterase to para-aminobenzoic acid derivatives, then excreted in the urine. This suggests their very short half lives. Allergy is more likely to occur with ester-type agents, as opposed to amide-type.

== Examples ==
Amino ester-type include:

- Cocaine
- Procaine (Novocain)
- Tetracaine (Pontocaine)
- Benzocaine
- Chloroprocaine
