= Ayds =

Appetite-suppressant candy

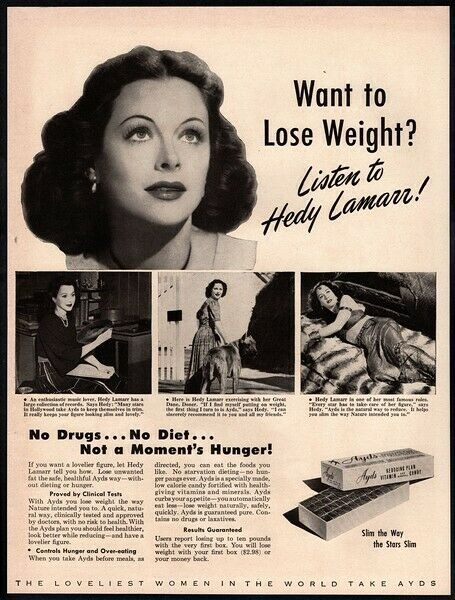
- 1952 Ayds advertisement with Hedy Lamarr.
- Product type: Appetite-suppressant candy
- Produced by: Purex
- Country: United States
- Introduced: 1940
- Discontinued: Late-1980’s

Ayds Reducing Plan Candy (/eɪdz/) was an appetite-suppressant candy introduced around 1940 in the United States.

== Flavors ==
Ayds was available in chocolate, chocolate mint, butterscotch, and caramel flavors, and later a peanut butter flavor was introduced. The original packaging used the phrase "Ayds Reducing Plan vitamin and mineral Candy"; a later version used the phrase "appetite suppressant candy". The active ingredient was originally benzocaine, presumably to reduce the sense of taste to reduce eating, later changed in the candy (as reported by The New York Times) to phenylpropanolamine.

== History ==
The product was introduced by the Carlay Company of Chicago. In 1944, the U.S. Federal Trade Commission objected to the claim that the product could cause the user to "lose up to 10 pounds in 5 days, without dieting or exercising". A U.S. trademark was registered in 1946 claiming its first use in commerce was in 1937. Carlay was eventually sold on to Purex. Bob Hope, his wife Dolores Hope, Tyrone Power, and his wife Linda Christian promoted Ayds.

In 1981, Purex sold the rights to the Ayds name to Jeffrey Martin Inc. In 1987, Jeffrey Martin, Inc. and its product line (including Ayds Appetite Suppressant and Compoz Sleep Aid) were acquired by the Dep Corporation (sometimes written DEP).

By the mid-1980s, public awareness of AIDS brought notoriety to the brand due to the phonetic similarity of names and the fact that the disease caused immense weight loss (cachexia) in patients. In a September 1985 newspaper interview titled "AIDS has aided Ayds", the president of Ayds' manufacturing company stated that sales had actually increased as a result of the connection, and that "people who suffer from that disease (AIDS) are not the same people who are trying to lose weight". Another executive was quoted in early 1986: "The product has been around for 45 years. Let the disease change its name." Ayds announced it was seeking a new name in 1988, as sales had fallen by as much as 50%. The first rebrand debuted in the UK. "Slim" was appended to Ayds to create a new name, "Aydslim". Marketing strategists quickly criticized the choice since it still contained the name of a disease. Sales did not improve despite new flavors (apple and black currant), advertising, renaming efforts, and a subsequent US-focused campaign as "Diet Ayds" was unsuccessful.
