= Hexobarbital =

Chemical compound

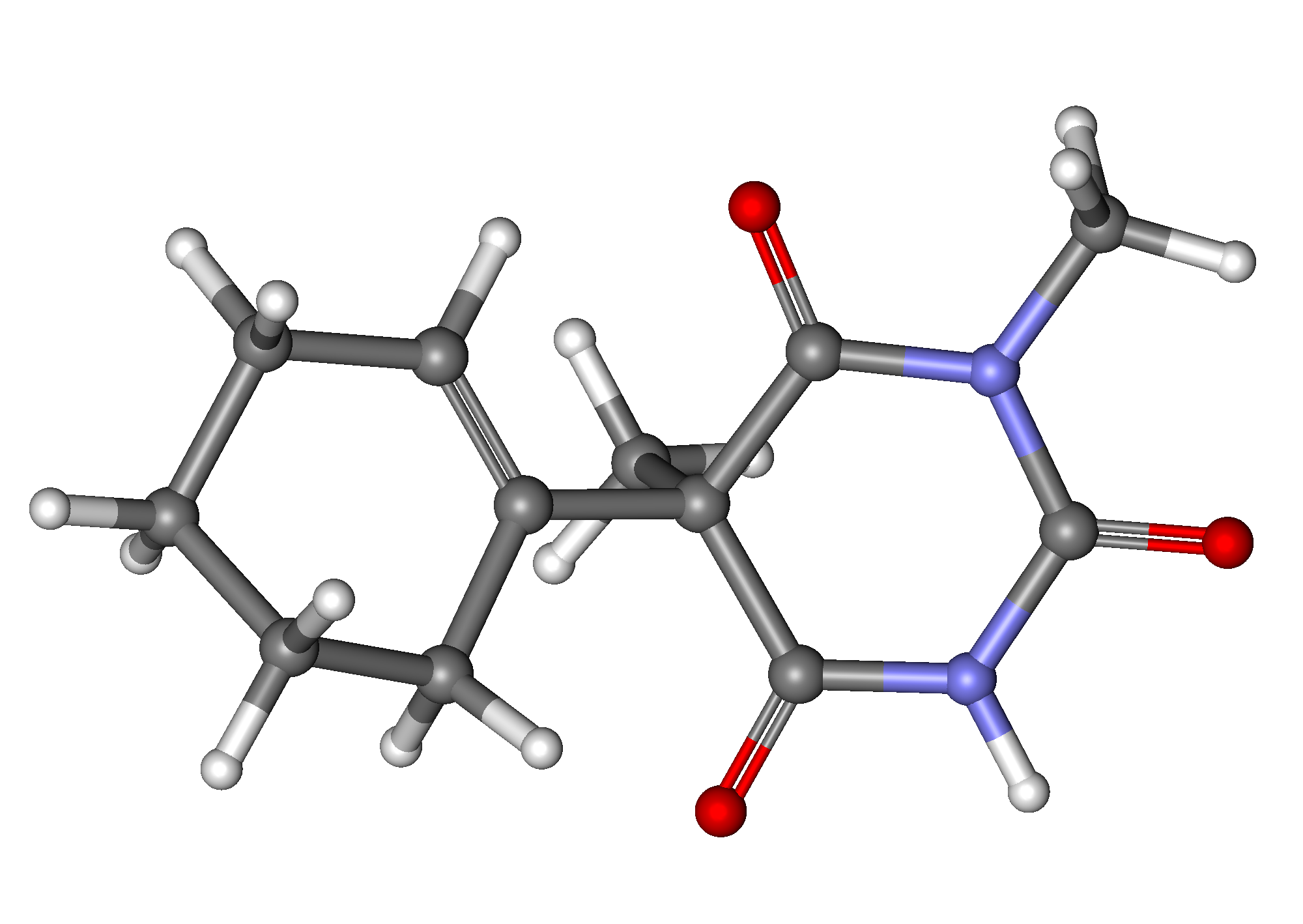

Clinical data
- Trade names: Hexobarbital, Hexobarbitone, Methylhexabital, Methexenyl, Evipal
- ATC code: N01AF02 (WHO) N05CA16 (WHO)

Legal status
- Legal status: CA: Schedule IV; US: Schedule III

Pharmacokinetic data
- Protein binding: 25%

Identifiers
- IUPAC name: 5-(cyclohex-1-en-1-yl)-1,5-dimethylpyrimidine-2,4,6(1H,3H,5H)-trione
- CAS Number: 56-29-1 50-09-9 (sodium salt)
- PubChem CID: 3608
- DrugBank: DB01355
- ChemSpider: 3482
- UNII: AL8Z8K3P6S
- KEGG: D01071
- ChEBI: CHEBI:5706
- ChEMBL: ChEMBL7728
- CompTox Dashboard (EPA): DTXSID9023122
- ECHA InfoCard: 100.000.241

Chemical and physical data
- Formula: C_{12}H_{16}N_{2}O_{3}
- Molar mass: 236.271 g·mol^{−1}
- 3D model (JSmol): Interactive image
- Chirality: Racemic mixture
- Density: 1.1623 g/cm^{3}
- Melting point: 146.5 °C (295.7 °F)
- Boiling point: 378.73 °C (713.71 °F)
- Solubility in water: 0.435 mg/mL (20 °C)
- SMILES: O=C1N(C(=O)NC(=O)C1(/C2=C/CCCC2)C)C
- InChI: InChI=1S/C12H16N2O3/c1-12(8-6-4-3-5-7-8)9(15)13-11(17)14(2)10(12)16/h6H,3-5,7H2,1-2H3,(H,13,15,17); Key:UYXAWHWODHRRMR-UHFFFAOYSA-N

Hexobarbital or hexobarbitone, sold both in acid and sodium salt forms as Citopan, Evipan, and Tobinal, is a barbiturate derivative having hypnotic and sedative effects. It was used in the 1940s and 1950s as an agent for inducing anesthesia for surgery, as well as a rapid-acting, short-lasting hypnotic for general use, and has a relatively fast onset of effects and short duration of action. Modern barbiturates (such as Thiopental) have largely supplanted the use of hexobarbital as an anesthetic, as they allow for better control of the depth of anesthesia. Hexobarbital is still used in some scientific research.

== History ==
The chemical class of barbiturates are one of the oldest sedative-hypnotic agents known, dating back from the introduction of barbital in the early 20th century. In Hungary, hexobarbital (and other barbiturates) were regularly used as drugs by pregnant women attempting suicide. Hexobarbital was long thought to have potentially teratogenic and fetotoxic effects. The FDA has classified them as Pregnancy Category D or C. Some research however, indicate that ingestion of Hexobarbital might cause congenital abnormalities.

During World War II, Herta Oberheuser was a Nazi physician and convicted war criminal, investigating the effects of hexobarbital. The experiments were mostly performed on woman prisoners in the Ravensbrück concentration camp.

== Application in research ==
Hexobarbital is used as the narcotic in the Hexobarbital Sleep Test (HST). HST identifies rodents with high or low intensity of microsomal oxidation, so fast (FM) or slow metabolizers (SM). The sleep test is for example used to predict the susceptibility and resistance to post-traumatic stress disorder (PTSD) or to determine the effect of toxic compounds on sleep time.

== Synthesis ==
Hexobarbital can be synthesized by reacting cyclohex-1-enyl 2-cyanopropanoate with guanidine and sodium methylate. A hexobarbital sodium intermediate is then formed which can be methylated with dimethyl sulfate.

Another pathway for hexobarbital synthesis is reacting ethyl 2-cyano-2-(cyclohex-1-enyl)propanoate with N-methylurea. This reaction is done in two stages, in the first stage the reactants are added with tert-butylate in tert-butyl alcohol at 20-50 °C. In the second stage hydrogen chloride is added with ethanol and water as solvent.

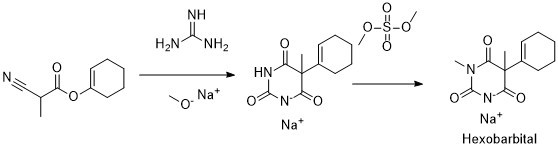
Synthesis of hexobarbital by reacting cyclohex-1-enyl 2-cyanopropanoate with guanidine and sodium ethylate, afterwards another methyl group is added through dimethyl sulfate

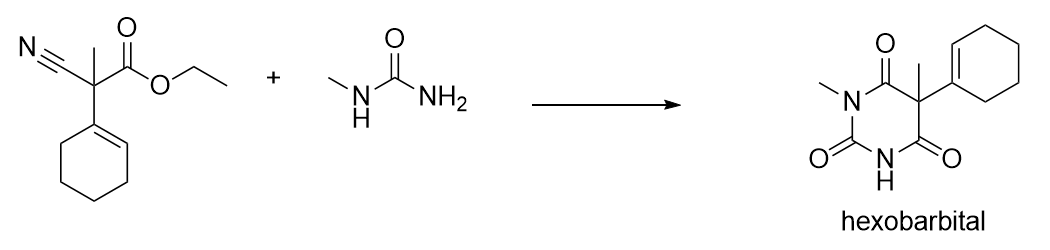
Alternative pathway for synthesis of hexobarbital by reacting ethyl 2-cyano-2-(cyclohex-1-enyl)propanoate with N-methylurea.

== Reactivity ==
One of the cytochrome P450 isozymes is coded by the gene CYP2B1, where hexobarbital is the substrate. Hexobarbital and the isozyme can form an enzyme-substrate-complex through a hydroxylation reaction, which is involved in the metabolism of xenobiotics. the concentration of hexobarbital also plays a role in oxygenase and oxidase activity of hepatic microsomal cytochrome P450.

Triacetyl oleandomycin, an inhibitor for isozyme CYP3A4, also inhibits hexobarbital metabolism and biological activity, indicating a close relationship between hexobarbital and cytochrome P450.

== Toxicity ==
=== Mechanism of actions ===
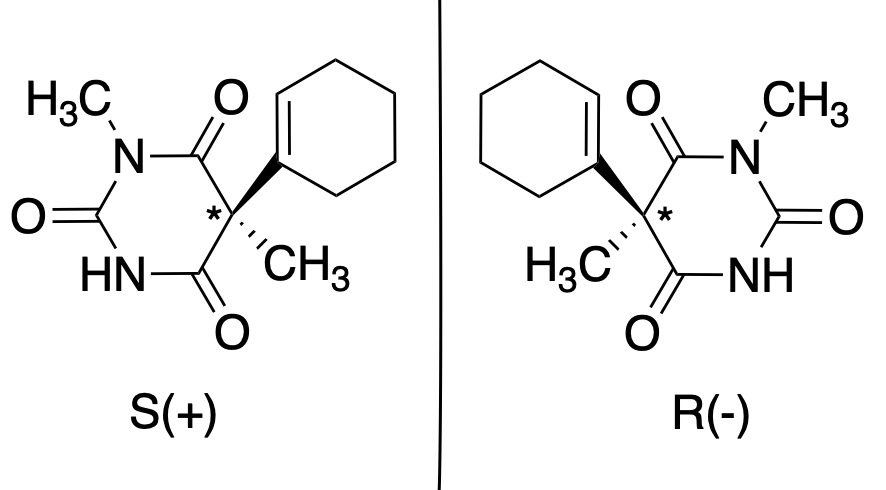
Molecular structure of S(+) and R(-) enantiomers of hexobarbital

The biological effects of hexobarbital depend primarily on its ability to penetrate the central nervous system. Hexobarbital can potentiate GABA_{A} receptors, like all barbiturates. It has been found over the years that the S(+) enantiomer of hexobarbital potentiates GABA_{A} receptors more effectively than its R(-) enantiomer. When GABA binds to the GABA_{A} receptor, the chloride ion channels open such that chloride ions can flow into the neuron. This causes a hyperpolarization in the membrane potential of the neuron, which makes it less likely for the neuron to start an action potential. Therefore, this type of receptor is the major inhibitory neurotransmitter receptor in the mammalian central nervous system. As a GABA_{A} receptor potentiator, hexobarbital binds to the barbiturate binding site localized in the chloride ion channel, thereby increasing the binding of GABA and benzodiazepines to their respective binding site, allosterically. Moreover, hexobarbital causes the chloride ion channel opening to their longest open state of 9 milli seconds, thereby causing the postsynaptic inhibitory effect to be extended. In contrast to GABA, glutamate is the major excitatory neurotransmitter in the mammalian brain. In addition to the inhibitory effect, hexobarbital blocks, like all barbiturates, AMPA receptors, kainate receptors, neural acetylcholine receptors. And above all, barbiturates inhibit glutamate release by causing an open channel block on P/Q‐type high‐voltage activated calcium channels. All in all, hexobarbital causes an CNS-depressant effect on the brain by inhibiting the glutamate release and potentiating the GABA-effect.

=== Metabolism ===
The hepatic metabolism of hexobarbital (HB) can be divided into different pathways all forming different metabolites. The S(+) enantiomer of HB preferentially metabolizes into β-3'-hydroxyhexobarbital and the R(-) enantiomer preferentially metabolizes into α-3'-hydroxyhexobarbital, the reaction thus is stereoselective. Both enantiomers, however, form both α- and β-isomers. In total four enantiomers for 3'-hydroxyhexobarbital (3HHB) can be metabolized. This reaction is catalyzed by a cytochrome P450, CYP2B1. All 3HHB isomers formed can undergo further metabolism via glucuronidation or dehydrogenation.

If 3HHB undergoes a glucuronidation reaction, via UDP-glucuronosyl transferases (UGTs), it is readily excreted. 3HHB can also undergo dehydrogenation, forming a reactive ketone, 3'-oxohexobarbital (3OHB). The biotransformation of 3HHB into 3OHB is via the enzyme 3HHB dehydrogenase (3HBD), a NAD(P)+ linked oxidation. This enzyme is part of the aldo-keto reductase (AKR) superfamily. In humans, 3HBD has a high preference for NAD^{+}. These reactions are also stereospecific, the R(-) conformation preferentially forms 3OHB as 3HBD has the highest activity for this enantiomer in both alpha and beta form.

New evidence proved the further metabolism of 3OHB into 1,5-dimethylbarbituric acid and a cyclohexenone glutathione adduct. This biotransformation step takes place via an epoxide-diol mechanism. The formation of a reactive epoxide, leads to the formation of the compounds mentioned.

Experiments in man indicated the major metabolites to be 3HHB, 3OHB and 1,5-dimethylbarbituric acid.

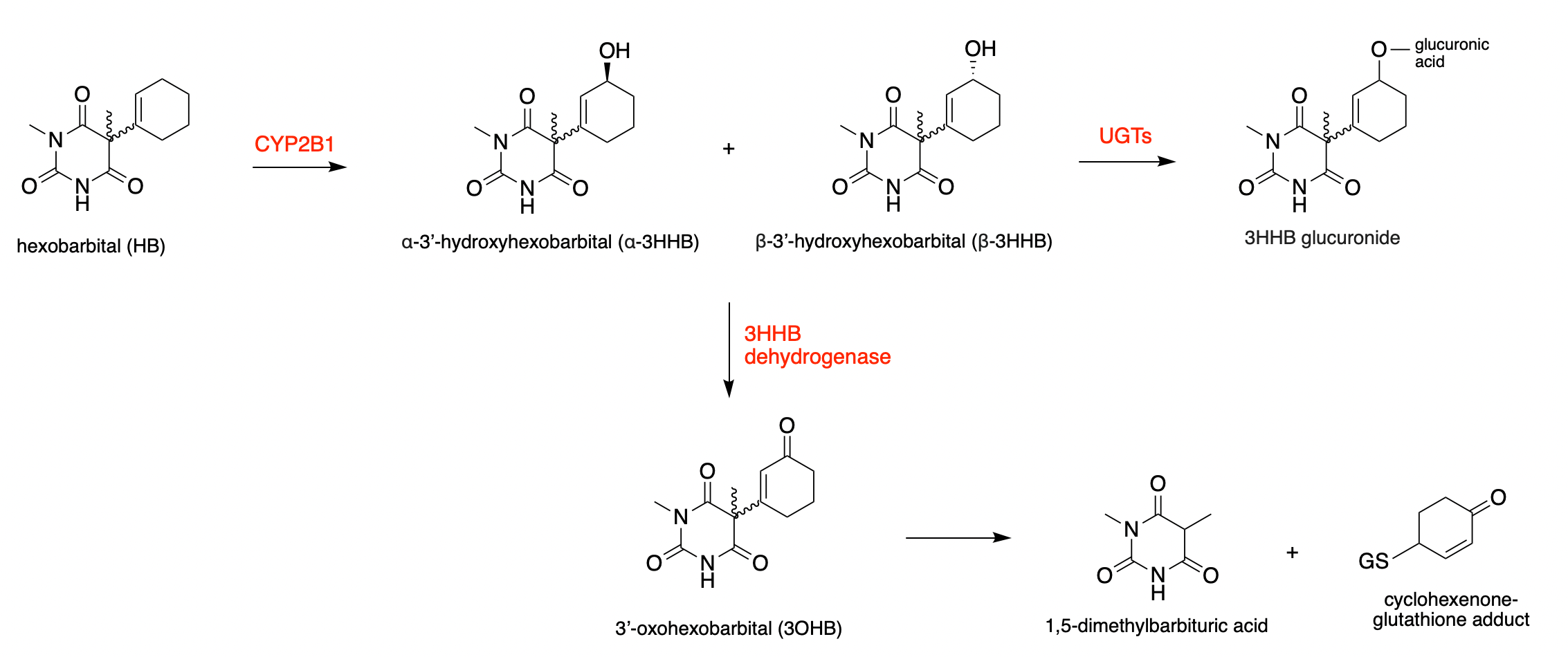
Metabolic pathway of hexobarbital

=== Health effects in man ===
==== Excretion ====
The plasma half-life of HB in man is estimated at 222±54 min. The clearance of HB differs between the two enantiomers and the age of the human subject. The clearance of the R(-) enantiomer is almost 10-fold greater than the clearance of the S(+) enantiomer. Clearance on average in elderly people, compared to young subjects, is slower. Excretion is mainly via urine, for the three major metabolites. The cyclohexenone glutathione adduct is excreted in the bile.

==== Symptoms ====
An intoxication in man with hexobarbital can result in sluggishness, incoordination, difficulty in thinking, slowness of speech, faulty judgment, drowsiness or coma, shallow breathing and staggering. In some severe cases coma and death can be the result of an overdose.

=== Effects on animals ===
The following table presents the studies about the effects of hexobarbital on animals, which are done in the 1900s. Most of these studies showed that hexobarbital has short-term toxicity effects and that it can induce hypnotic effects in mice, rabbits and frogs.

Table 1: Effects of hexobarbital on animals
| Organism | Testtype | Route | Dose | Effect | Reference |
|---|---|---|---|---|---|
| rat | LD50 | intraperitoneal | 330 mg/kg (330 mg/kg) | | |
| rat | LDLo | subcutaneous | 400 mg/kg (400 mg/kg) | | |
| mouse | LD50 | oral | 468 mg/kg (468 mg/kg) | Prolongation of sleeping time | |
| mouse | LD50 | intraperitoneal | 270 mg/kg (270 mg/kg) | Prolongation of sleeping time and immobility time, which are potentiated by L-asparagine | |
| mouse | LDLo | subcutaneous | 250 mg/kg (250 mg/kg) | | |
| mouse | LD50 | intravenous | 133 mg/kg (133 mg/kg) | Behavioural: somnolence (general depressed activity) | Archives Internationales de Pharmacodynamie et de Therapie., 163(11), 1966 |
| mouse | LDLo | intrapleural | 340 mg/kg (340 mg/kg) | Hypnotic effect, which is potentiated by 4,5-dihydro-6-methyl-2[2-(4-pyridyl)-ethyl]-3-pyridazinone (U-320) | |
| mouse | LD50 | parenteral | 160 mg/kg (160 mg/kg) | | Pharmacology and Toxicology. English translation of FATOAO., 20(569), 1957 |
| rabbit | LDLo | oral | 1200 mg/kg (1200 mg/kg) | Ultra-short actors; hypnotic effect Minimal lethal dose: 1200 mg/kg Minimal hypnotic dose: 15 mg/kg | |
| rabbit | LDLo | intravenous | 80 mg/kg (80 mg/kg) | Ultra-short actors; hypnotic effect Minimal lethal dose: 80 mg/kg Minimal hypnotic dose: 15 mg/kg | |
| rabbit | LDLo | rectal | 175 mg/kg (175 mg/kg) | Ultra-short actors; hypnotic effect Minimal lethal dose: 175 mg/kg Minimal hypnotic dose: 15 mg/kg | |
| frog | LDLo | intraperitoneal | 30 mg/kg (30 mg/kg) | | |
| frog | LD50 | parenteral | 148 mg/kg (148 mg/kg) | | Pharmacology and Toxicology. English translation of FATOAO., 20(569), 1957 |

== In popular culture ==
In Agatha Christie's 1937 mystery Cards on the Table, Hexobarbital is used in conjunction with Veronal to induce overdose. It is referred to by Hercule Poirot as both N-methyl-cyclo-hexenyl-methyl-malonyl urea and Evipan. It was also used in Graham Greene's The Heart of the Matter (1948) Evipan was prescribed for a main character in tablet form to use as a sleeping aid.
