= Cēpacol =

Brand

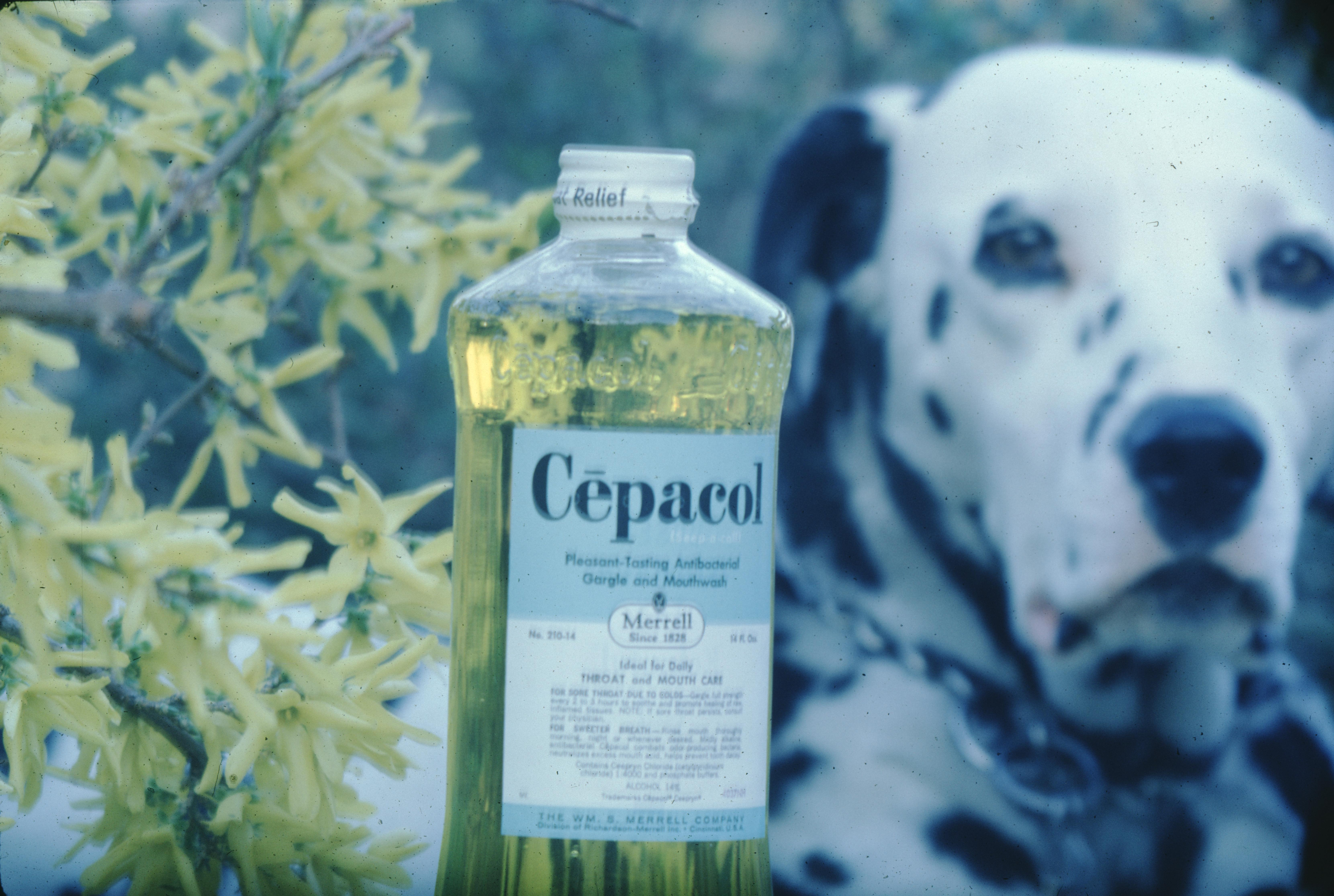
Cēpacol

Cepacol (/ˈsiːpəkɒl/ SEE-pə-kol styled Cēpacol) is an American brand of personal hygiene products, as well as for relief of sore throat. It is distributed in the US by Reckitt. The brand was originally owned by J.B. Williams. Following acquisition by Combe Incorporated, Combe Incorporated sold Cepacol to Reckitt Benckiser in 2011.

They were originally recognized for their yellow mouthwash, the active ingredient of which is Ceepryn (cetylpyridinium chloride), hence the name. The distinctive flavor and color is known as "Original Gold". Cēpacol claims that their mouthwash is the most-used brand in hospitals.

Cēpacol also makes oral anesthetics, such as its cherry flavored throat spray and soother that provides temporary pain relief for an "itchy" or sore throat as it lubricates the throat and makes it feel better. Cēpacol has released different health and hygiene products including throat lozenges. The major active ingredients of the sugar-free lozenges are cetylpyridinium chloride, benzocaine (which produces the numbing sensation), and menthol. The major active ingredient in the sore throat sprays is dyclonine hydrochloride.

In Australia, Cēpacol lozenges contain cetylpyridinium chloride and benzyl alcohol. Cepacaine lozenges contain lignocaine and cetylpyridinium chloride, and Cepacaine mouthwash contains benzocaine and cetylpyridinium chloride. The Australian brand is owned by Bayer, having been sold by Merrell Dow to Roche, who then divested their Australian and New Zealand over-the-counter drug business to Bayer.

In the US, the Cēpacol lozenges have benzocaine while the mouthwash has cetylpyridinium chloride.
