= Piridocaine =

Names
- IUPAC name 2-(2-Piperidinyl)ethyl 2-aminobenzoate

Identifiers
CAS Number	87-21-8
3D model (JSmol)	Interactive image
ChEBI	CHEBI:135011
ChEMBL	ChEMBL2110989
ChemSpider	6613
PubChem CID	6875
UNII	488S0H4SQF
CompTox Dashboard (EPA)	DTXSID601024704
- InChI: InChI=BMIJYAZXNZEMLI-UHFFFAOYSA-N Key: InChI=1S/C14H20N2O2/c15-13-7-2-1-6-12(13)14(17)18-10-8-11-5-3-4-9-16-11/h1-2,6-7,11,16H,3-5,8-10,15H2
- SMILES: c1ccc(c(c1)C(=O)OCCC2CCCCN2)N

Properties
Chemical formula	C_{14}H_{20}N_{2}O_{2}
Molar mass	248.326 g·mol^{−1}
- Except where otherwise noted, data are given for materials in their standard state (at 25 °C [77 °F], 100 kPa). Infobox references

Piridocaine is a local anesthetic.

== See also ==
- Piperocaine
