= Dyclonine =

Anesthetic

Clinical data
- Trade names: Sucrets
- AHFS/Drugs.com: Monograph
- Routes of administration: Lozenge
- ATC code: N01BX02 (WHO) R02AD04 (WHO)

Legal status
- Legal status: US: OTC

Identifiers
- IUPAC name: 1-(4-butoxyphenyl)-3-(1-piperidyl)propan-1-one
- CAS Number: 586-60-7
- PubChem CID: 3180
- IUPHAR/BPS: 7173
- DrugBank: DB00645
- ChemSpider: 3068
- UNII: 078A24Q30O
- KEGG: D07881
- ChEBI: CHEBI:4724
- ChEMBL: ChEMBL1201217
- CompTox Dashboard (EPA): DTXSID6047864

Chemical and physical data
- Formula: C_{18}H_{27}NO_{2}
- Molar mass: 289.419 g·mol^{−1}
- 3D model (JSmol): Interactive image
- SMILES: O=C(c1ccc(OCCCC)cc1)CCN2CCCCC2
- InChI: InChI=1S/C18H27NO2/c1-2-3-15-21-17-9-7-16(8-10-17)18(20)11-14-19-12-5-4-6-13-19/h7-10H,2-6,11-15H2,1H3; Key:BZEWSEKUUPWQDQ-UHFFFAOYSA-N

Dyclonine (Dyclocaine) is an oral anaesthetic that is the active ingredient of Sucrets, an over-the-counter throat lozenge. It is also found in some varieties of the Cepacol sore throat spray. It is a local anesthetic, used topically as the hydrochloride salt.

== History ==
The product Sucrets was introduced in Baltimore, Maryland, by Sharp & Dohme in 1932.

In 1966 the Federal Trade Commission ordered Merck and Company to discontinue the false claims of germ-killing and pain-relieving properties for its Sucrets and Children's Sucrets throat lozenges. In 1977, it was acquired by Beecham, later merging with SmithKline Beckman in 1989 to form SmithKline Beecham. Also in 1977, Sucrets released a memorable TV commercial starring Harry Goz as a miserable husband who wakes his wife up to remedy his sore throat. The ad ran for many years and helped increase the brand's sales. By 1994 the brand switched from a metal container to a plastic container. SmithKline Beecham, after announcing a merger with GlaxoWellcome to form GlaxoSmithKline, sold the brand in 2000 to Insight Pharmaceuticals. In 2011, Sucrets reintroduced their product back into the familiar tin due to popular demand and nostalgia.

== See also ==
- Hexylresorcinol
