= Isobucaine =

Chemical compound

Identifiers
- IUPAC name: [2-methyl-2-(2-methylpropylamino)propyl] benzoate
- CAS Number: 14055-89-1
- PubChem CID: 26427
- ChemSpider: 24619
- UNII: 2XV8GIV746
- CompTox Dashboard (EPA): DTXSID20161440

Chemical and physical data
- Formula: C_{15}H_{23}NO_{2}
- Molar mass: 249.354 g·mol^{−1}
- 3D model (JSmol): Interactive image
- SMILES: CC(C)CNC(C)(C)COC(=O)c1ccccc1
- InChI: InChI=1S/C15H23NO2/c1-12(2)10-16-15(3,4)11-18-14(17)13-8-6-5-7-9-13/h5-9,12,16H,10-11H2,1-4H3; Key:YGSFZBYOMFZJPV-UHFFFAOYSA-N

Isobucaine is a local anesthetic.

== Synthesis ==
Synthesis:

The reductive amination between aminomethyl propanol (1) and Isobutyraldehyde (2) afforded N-Isobutyl-1,1-dimethyl-2-hydroxyethanamine, CID:18315986 (3). Acylation of the amine with benzoyl chloride [98-88-4] hypothetically goes initially to the amide (4'). The acid catalysis used in the reaction leads to an N to O acyl migration to afford isobucaine (5).

== See also ==
- List of local anesthetics
