= Narcobarbital =

Chemical compound

Clinical data
- Trade names: Eunarcon
- ATC code: N01AG01 (WHO)

Identifiers
- IUPAC name: 5-(2-bromoprop-2-en-1-yl)-5-isopropyl-1-methylpyrimidine-2,4,6(1H,3H,5H)-trione
- CAS Number: 125-55-3
- PubChem CID: 18735
- ChemSpider: 17691
- UNII: A77U8G9H84
- KEGG: C17722
- ChEMBL: ChEMBL92963
- CompTox Dashboard (EPA): DTXSID30871609

Chemical and physical data
- Formula: C_{11}H_{15}BrN_{2}O_{3}
- Molar mass: 303.156 g·mol^{−1}
- 3D model (JSmol): Interactive image
- SMILES: O=C1N(C(=O)NC(=O)C1(CC(\Br)=C)C(C)C)C
- InChI: InChI=1S/C11H15BrN2O3/c1-6(2)11(5-7(3)12)8(15)13-10(17)14(4)9(11)16/h6H,3,5H2,1-2,4H3,(H,13,15,17); Key:WGMASVSHOSNKMF-UHFFFAOYSA-N

Narcobarbital (Pronarcon) is a barbiturate derivative developed in 1932 by Carl Heinrich Friedrich Boedecker and Heinrich Gruber Schoneberg, assignors to the firm J. D. Riedel-E. de Haën AG, Berlin, Germany. Later, in 1937, may, was patented in United States. It is an N-methylated derivative of propallylonal and has similar sedative effects. It is still used in veterinary medicine for inducing surgical anaesthesia.
