= Butanilicaine =

Names
- IUPAC name N^{2}-Butyl-N^{1}-(2-chloro-6-methylphenyl)glycinamide
- Systematic IUPAC name 2-(Butylamino)-N-(2-chloro-6-methylphenyl)acetamide

Identifiers
CAS Number	3785-21-5
3D model (JSmol)	Interactive image
ChEBI	CHEBI:55518
ChEMBL	ChEMBL2104238
ChemSpider	21004
PubChem CID	22379
UNII	7X3WV51F4N
CompTox Dashboard (EPA)	DTXSID90191279
- InChI: InChI=1S/C13H19ClN2O/c1-3-4-8-15-9-12(17)16-13-10(2)6-5-7-11(13)14/h5-7,15H,3-4,8-9H2,1-2H3,(H,16,17) Key: VWYQKFLLGRBICZ-UHFFFAOYSA-N; InChI=1/C13H19ClN2O/c1-3-4-8-15-9-12(17)16-13-10(2)6-5-7-11(13)14/h5-7,15H,3-4,8-9H2,1-2H3,(H,16,17) Key: VWYQKFLLGRBICZ-UHFFFAOYAQ
- SMILES: CCCCNCC(=O)NC1=C(C=CC=C1Cl)C

Properties
Chemical formula	C_{13}H_{19}ClN_{2}O
Molar mass	254.76 g·mol^{−1}

Pharmacology
ATC code	N01BB05 (WHO)
- Except where otherwise noted, data are given for materials in their standard state (at 25 °C [77 °F], 100 kPa). Infobox references

Butanilicaine is a local anesthetic. It is also known by the name Hostacaine.

== Synthesis ==

An amide is formed by reacting 2-chloro-6-methylaniline (1) with chloroacetyl chloride (2), yielding intermediate (3), which is reacted with alkylate N-butylamine (4) to yield butanilicaine.
