= Septodont =

French pharmaceutical and medical device company

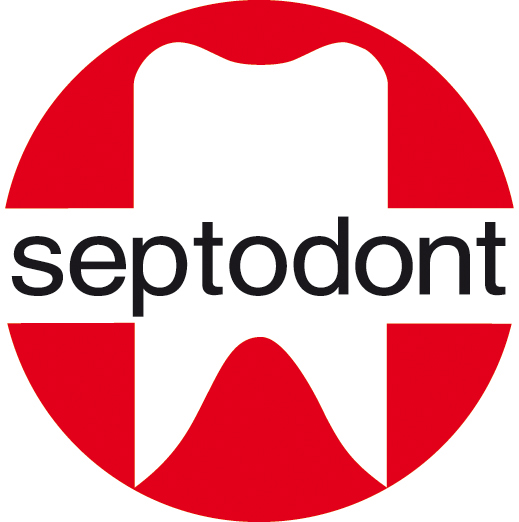
- Industry: Dental, Medical Devices
- Founded: 1932
- Founder: Annie & Nestor Schiller
- Headquarters: Saint-Maur-des-Fossés, France
- Number of employees: 2500
- Website: www.septodont.com

Septodont is a French pharmaceutical and medical device company mainly dedicated to developing, manufacturing and distributing dental consumables. It is headquartered in Saint-Maur-des-Fossés (France)

== History ==
Septodont was founded in France in 1932 by Annie & Nestor Schiller. In the 1950s and 1960s, under the leadership of Henri Schiller, Septodont started to introduce dental therapeutics and to focus on dental anesthesia with local anesthetics in single use cartridges. Beyond the focus on dental anesthesia, Septodont invested in Research and Development towards bioactive and biocompatible therapeutic solutions.

Between 2014 and 2016, Septodont made three acquisitions outside France. In 2014, the company acquired TDV, a restorative-products manufacturer based in Pomerode, Santa Catarina, Brazil. In October 2015, its Canadian subsidiary Novocol Healthcare acquired a majority stake in Duoject Medical Systems, a Quebec-based designer of injection devices. In February 2016, Septodont acquired DLA, an injectable dental-anesthetic manufacturing plant in Catanduva, São Paulo, Brazil, from Dentsply International. The company also opened a new manufacturing unit for injectable anesthetics at its headquarters in Saint-Maur-des-Fossés in 2016.

Beyond the dental field, through its subsidiary Novocol Healthcare, Septodont partners with pharmaceutical and medical device companies.

Septodont remains a 100% family-owned business. In June 2025, Olivier Schiller transitioned from Chief Executive Officer to Chairman of the Board, with Karim Khadr succeeding him as CEO.

== Products ==
- Dental anesthesia: topical and local anesthetics, safety devices, needles, syringes and reversals
- Endodontics & restorative products
- Regeneration & surgery
