= Iontocaine =

Chemical compound

Combination of
- Lidocaine: Local anesthetic
- Epinephrine: Vasoconstrictor

Clinical data
- Routes of administration: Topical

Legal status
- Legal status: US: Approved in 1995, discontinued in 2005

Identifiers
- CAS Number: 54958-67-7
- CompTox Dashboard (EPA): DTXSID10970306

Iontocaine was an anesthetic medication, marketed under the two brand names Numby and Phoresor PM900 by IOMED inc. It is a local anesthetic with vasoconstrictor, administered via iontophoresis through the skin. It can numb up to 10 mm of skin in as little as 10 minutes. It is a 2% lidocaine, 0.01 mg/ml epinephrine solution. It was manufactured by IOMED, Inc.

Iontocaine was approved by the United States Food and Drug Administration on 21 December 1995. It was discontinued by the manufacturer in 2005.
