= Metabutoxycaine =

Chemical compound

Clinical data
- Routes of administration: Dental syringe (as novocaine is administered)

Pharmacokinetic data
- Metabolism: Lasts for at least 12 hours after injection.

Identifiers
- IUPAC name: 2-diethylaminoethyl 3-amino-2-butoxybenzoate
- CAS Number: 3624-87-1
- PubChem CID: 19247
- ChemSpider: 18160
- UNII: AMV9L2WT8K
- CompTox Dashboard (EPA): DTXSID40189787

Chemical and physical data
- Formula: C_{17}H_{28}N_{2}O_{3}
- Molar mass: 308.422 g·mol^{−1}
- 3D model (JSmol): Interactive image
- SMILES: CCCCOC1=C(C=CC=C1N)C(=O)OCCN(CC)CC
- InChI: InChI=1S/C17H28N2O3/c1-4-7-12-21-16-14(9-8-10-15(16)18)17(20)22-13-11-19(5-2)6-3/h8-10H,4-7,11-13,18H2,1-3H3; Key:LJQWYEFHNLTPBZ-UHFFFAOYSA-N

Metabutoxycaine, marketed under the trade name Primacaine, is a local anesthetic. It is used in dentistry. It has the U.S. patent number 2,882,296.
