= Cyclomethycaine =

Local anesthetic

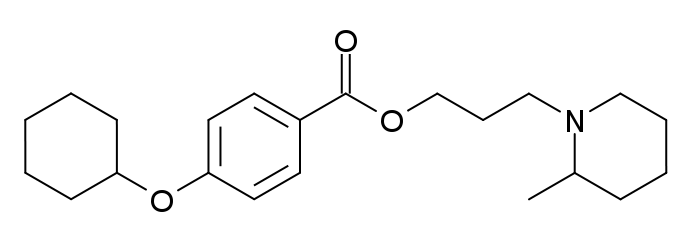

Names
- IUPAC name 4-(cyclohexoxy)benzoic acid 3-(2-methyl-1-piperidinyl)propyl ester

Identifiers
CAS Number	139-62-8
3D model (JSmol)	Interactive image
ChEMBL	ChEMBL127487
ChemSpider	10382
PubChem CID	10839
UNII	15E9I74NZ8
CompTox Dashboard (EPA)	DTXSID8057643
- InChI: InChI=1/C22H33NO3/c1-18-8-5-6-15-23(18)16-7-17-25-22(24)19-11-13-21(14-12-19)26-20-9-3-2-4-10-20/h11-14,18,20H,2-10,15-17H2,1H3 Key: YLRNESBGEGGQBK-UHFFFAOYAS
- SMILES: O=C(OCCCN1C(CCCC1)C)c3ccc(OC2CCCCC2)cc3

Properties
Chemical formula	C_{22}H_{33}NO_{3}
Molar mass	359.50232
- Except where otherwise noted, data are given for materials in their standard state (at 25 °C [77 °F], 100 kPa). Infobox references

Cyclomethycaine is a local anesthetic. It was first approved for use by the United States Food and Drug Administration in 1948.
