= Infiltration analgesia =

Deposition of a painkiller near the apex of a tooth root

Infiltration analgesia is deposition of an analgesic (pain-relieving) drug close to the apex of a tooth so that it can diffuse to reach the nerve entering the apical foramina. It is the most routinely used in dental local treatment.

== Nerves for dental infiltration analgesia ==
In the maxillary arch nerves for infiltration are branches of the superior alveolar, the greater palatine and the nasopalatine nerve

- Posterior superior alveolar nerve supplies the molars (not including the mesiobuccal root of the maxillary first molar), the surrounding bone, periodontal ligament, periosteum and buccal soft tissues
- Middle superior alveolar nerve supplies the premolars and the mesiobuccal root of the maxillary first molar, the surrounding bone, periodontal ligament, periosteum and buccal soft tissues
- Anterior superior alveolar nerve supplies the anterior canines and incisors, the surrounding bone, periodontal ligament, periosteum and buccal soft tissues

Anaesthetising the greater palatine nerve would allow loss of sensation to the tissues of the hard palate distally to the anterior most distal aspect of the canine and the nasopalatine nerve to the palatal aspect of the anterior teeth or premaxilla

In the mandibular arch the nerves used in infiltration are:

- The inferior alveolar nerve to anaesthetise all of the teeth in the mandibular arch
- The long buccal nerve which supplies the soft tissue buccally to the mandibular molars
- The lingual nerve which anaesthetising stops sensation to the lingual aspect of the gingiva, floor of the mouth and the tongue to the midline on that particular side

Local anaesthetic is used routinely for dental procedures in oral surgery, restorative, periodontal, and prosthetic dentistry. Infiltration injections are a safe and effective method for dealing with daily dental procedures and dental pain.

Nevertheless, some complications can arise from infiltrations. Complications can be divided in to two groups:

- Local complications
- Systemic Complications

=== Local Complication ===
Needle Breakage – rare since the introduction of disposable needles. If it happens, remove with tweezers if needle end is visible. If the end is not visible, patient must be referred to the maxillofacial unit immediately, and instructed not to talk in the meantime, to avoid needle movement.

Pain during administering – avoid injecting too quickly. If injected in to the nerve, retract needle slightly to prevent nerve damage.

Insufficient anaesthesia – usually happens due to injection to the blood vessels or injections in inflamed tissues. Avoid injection into the blood vessels by using the aspirating technique. If the tissues around are inflamed, try depositing solution at a distance or give a block injection.

Excessive spread of anaesthesia – occurs when local anaesthetic spreads to the other nerves in close proximity. It is more common in the maxillary region affecting external eye muscles after injecting into the maxillary tuberosity, or Horner's syndrome if cervical sympathetic fibres are involved. Symptoms usually subside in a few hours after anaesthetic affect disappears.

Iatrogenic damage and self-inflicted damage of anaesthetised tissues – soft tissues are also anaesthetised during infiltration. Patients are needed to be warned of self-care while numb.

Skin paleness – usually disappear in few minutes to half an hour.

Tissue necrosis – usually seen in the hard palate. Avoid too much pressure and limit amount of anaesthetic for palatal infiltrations.

Haematoma formation – is formed due to prickle of the blood vessels. It rarely results in serious complications. However, care should be taken for lingual infiltrations and infiltrations closed to maxillary tuberosity area.

Infection – usually only affects immunocompromised patients. Consider disinfecting injection area prior to injection.

=== Systemic complication ===
Vasovagal collapse – most frequent systemic complication. Cause for vasovagal collapse is due to the activation of parasympathetic nervous system and inhibition of the parasympathetic nervous system. These lead to a reduction in heart frequency and dilation of arterioles in the muscle causing reduced blood circulation in the brain. If vasovagal collapse occurs, put patient in the supine position with the feet higher than the head.

Hyperventilation syndrome – caused by shallow breathing and a reduction of carbon dioxide level in the blood which leads to an increased pH in blood. Patient can feel tingling sensation in the hands and feet, and sometimes experience chest pressure and light-headedness. Prevention can be achieved by reassuring patient and dictating the rhythm of breathing.

Toxicity – usually caused by overdose or intravascular injection which causes a short-lived toxic concentration in the blood circulation. Prevention required to prevent toxicity includes the calculation of maximum dosage for the individual, and a self-aspirating syringe to prevent intravascular injection.

Systemic effect of vasoconstrictors – only relevant if intravascular infiltration has been administered. Adrenaline containing local anaesthetic solution can increase heart rate and blood pressure. Avoid by using self-aspirating syringe.

Allergic reaction – was more common with the use of ester anaesthetic solution. Since the use of amide anaesthetic, the allergic reactions are extremely rare. However, if patient has developed hypotension, tachycardia, respiratory difficulties, or loss of consciousness after administering anaesthetic, emergency measures must be taken.

== See also ==
- Regional analgesia
- Local analgesia
