= Orthocaine =

Names
- Preferred IUPAC name Methyl 3-amino-4-hydroxybenzoate
- Other names aminobenz

Identifiers
CAS Number	536-25-4
3D model (JSmol)	Interactive image
Beilstein Reference	3-14-00-01477
ChemSpider	10358
ECHA InfoCard	100.007.845
EC Number	208-627-3
KEGG	C14171
PubChem CID	10815
UNII	JK16YI13QK
CompTox Dashboard (EPA)	DTXSID2060208
- InChI: InChI=1S/C8H9NO3/c1-12-8(11)5-2-3-7(10)6(9)4-5/h2-4,10H,9H2,1H3 Key: VNQABZCSYCTZMS-UHFFFAOYSA-N
- SMILES: COC(=O)C1=CC(N)=C(O)C=C1

Properties
Chemical formula	C_{8}H_{9}NO_{3}
Molar mass	167.16196
- Except where otherwise noted, data are given for materials in their standard state (at 25 °C [77 °F], 100 kPa). Infobox references

Orthocaine is a local anesthetic. Developed in the 1890s, it was found to be of limited use due to its low solubility in water, but it has been used in powdered form to dust onto painful wounds.
