= Topical tac =

Topical tac is a topical anesthetic solution introduced by Pryor et al. in 1980. It is a mixture of 5 to 12% tetracaine, 0.05% adrenaline, and 4 or 10% cocaine hydrochloride (hence the "TAC" nomenclature). It has been used in ear, nose, and throat surgery and in the emergency department where numbing of the surface is needed rapidly. Use in the pediatric patient cohort has been documented, including when children have been injured in the eye, ear, or other sensitive locations.

Due to drug diversion concerns surrounding the use of cocaine in medicine, along with concern regarding toxicity and expense, the cocaine was replaced with lidocaine and a new anesthetic was created - lidocaine, epinephrine, and tetracaine (LET).
