= Propoxycaine =

Names
- Preferred IUPAC name 2-(Diethylamino)ethyl 4-amino-2-propoxybenzoate

Identifiers
CAS Number	86-43-1
3D model (JSmol)	Interactive image
ChEBI	CHEBI:8496
ChEMBL	ChEMBL1195
ChemSpider	6582
ECHA InfoCard	100.001.519
EC Number	201-670-9
KEGG	C07895
MeSH	D011430
PubChem CID	6843
UNII	EPD1EH7F53
CompTox Dashboard (EPA)	DTXSID6047866
- InChI: InChI=1S/C16H26N2O3/c1-4-10-20-15-12-13(17)7-8-14(15)16(19)21-11-9-18(5-2)6-3/h7-8,12H,4-6,9-11,17H2,1-3H3 Key: CAJIGINSTLKQMM-UHFFFAOYSA-N; InChI=1/C16H26N2O3/c1-4-10-20-15-12-13(17)7-8-14(15)16(19)21-11-9-18(5-2)6-3/h7-8,12H,4-6,9-11,17H2,1-3H3 Key: CAJIGINSTLKQMM-UHFFFAOYAD
- SMILES: CCCOC1=C(C=CC(=C1)N)C(=O)OCCN(CC)CC

Properties
Chemical formula	C_{16}H_{26}N_{2}O_{3}
Molar mass	294.38924
- Except where otherwise noted, data are given for materials in their standard state (at 25 °C [77 °F], 100 kPa). verify (what is ?) Infobox references

Propoxycaine (INN) is a local anesthetic.
