= Prilocaine =

Local anesthetic of the amino amide type

Clinical data
- Trade names: Citanest
- AHFS/Drugs.com: Monograph
- MedlinePlus: a603026
- License data: EU EMA: by INN; US DailyMed: Prilocaine
- Pregnancy category: AU: A
- Routes of administration: Subcutaneous
- ATC code: N01BB04 (WHO)

Legal status
- Legal status: AU: S4 (Prescription only); US: ℞-only

Pharmacokinetic data
- Protein binding: 55%
- Metabolism: Liver and kidney
- Elimination half-life: 10-150 minutes, longer with impaired liver or kidney function

Identifiers
- IUPAC name: (RS)-N-(2-methylphenyl)-N^{2}-propylalaninamide
- CAS Number: 721-50-6
- PubChem CID: 4906
- IUPHAR/BPS: 7276
- DrugBank: DB00750
- ChemSpider: 4737
- UNII: 046O35D44R
- KEGG: D00553; as HCl: D01243
- ChEBI: CHEBI:8404
- ChEMBL: ChEMBL1194
- CompTox Dashboard (EPA): DTXSID7031955
- ECHA InfoCard: 100.010.871

Chemical and physical data
- Formula: C_{13}H_{20}N_{2}O
- Molar mass: 220.316 g·mol^{−1}
- 3D model (JSmol): Interactive image
- Chirality: Racemic mixture
- Melting point: 37 to 38 °C (99 to 100 °F)
- SMILES: O=C(Nc1ccccc1C)C(NCCC)C
- InChI: InChI=1S/C13H20N2O/c1-4-9-14-11(3)13(16)15-12-8-6-5-7-10(12)2/h5-8,11,14H,4,9H2,1-3H3,(H,15,16); Key:MVFGUOIZUNYYSO-UHFFFAOYSA-N

Prilocaine (/ˈpraɪləˌkeɪn/) is a local anesthetic of the amino amide type first prepared by Claes Tegner and Nils Löfgren. In its injectable form (trade name Citanest), it is often used in dentistry. It is also often combined with lidocaine as a topical preparation for dermal anesthesia (lidocaine/prilocaine or EMLA), for treatment of conditions like paresthesia. As it has low cardiac toxicity, it is commonly used for intravenous regional anaesthesia (IVRA).

== Contraindications ==
In some patients, ortho-toluidine, a metabolite of prilocaine, may cause methemoglobinemia, which may be treated with methylene blue. Prilocaine may also be contraindicated in people with sickle cell anemia, anemia, or symptomatic hypoxia.

== Combinations ==
It is given as a combination with the vasoconstrictor epinephrine under the trade name Citanest Forte. It is used as a eutectic mixture with lidocaine, 50% w/w, as lidocaine/prilocaine. The mixture is an oil with a melting point of 18 °C (64 °F). A 5% emulsion preparation, containing 2.5% each of lidocaine/prilocaine, is marketed by APP Pharmaceuticals under the trade name EMLA (an abbreviation for eutectic mixture of local anesthetics).

== Compendial status ==
- United States Pharmacopeia 31

== Synthesis ==
Synthesis: Patents: Revised: Sino:

The amidation between o-toluidine [95-53-4] (1) and 2-bromopropionyl bromide [563-76-8] (2) leads to 2-bromo-N-(2-methylphenyl)propanamide [19397-79-6] (3). Displacement of the remaining halide with propylamine [107-10-8] (4) completed the synthesis of prilocaine (5).

== See also ==
- Lidocaine/prilocaine
