= Piperocaine =

Chemical compound

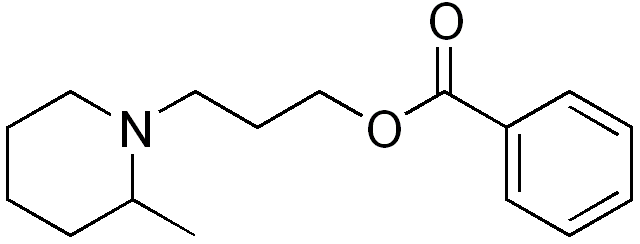

Clinical data
- ATC code: none

Identifiers
- IUPAC name: 3-(2-Methylpiperidin-1-yl)propyl benzoate
- CAS Number: 136-82-3
- PubChem CID: 10782
- ChemSpider: 10326
- UNII: F66XUI6GZL
- ChEMBL: ChEMBL127865
- CompTox Dashboard (EPA): DTXSID8048315
- ECHA InfoCard: 100.004.784

Chemical and physical data
- Formula: C_{16}H_{23}NO_{2}
- Molar mass: 261.365 g·mol^{−1}
- 3D model (JSmol): Interactive image
- SMILES: CC1CCCCN1CCCOC(C2=CC=CC=C2)=O
- InChI: InChI=1S/C16H23NO2/c1-14-8-5-6-11-17(14)12-7-13-19-16(18)15-9-3-2-4-10-15/h2-4,9-10,14H,5-8,11-13H2,1H3; Key:YQKAVWCGQQXBGW-UHFFFAOYSA-N

Piperocaine is a local anesthetic drug developed in the 1920s and used as its hydrochloride salt for infiltration and nerve blocks.

== Synthesis ==
Synthesis: Patent:

Alkylation between 3-chloropropyl benzoate [942-95-0] (1) and Pipicoline [109-05-7] (2) provides piperocaine (3).

== See also ==
- Hexylcaine
