= Trimecaine =

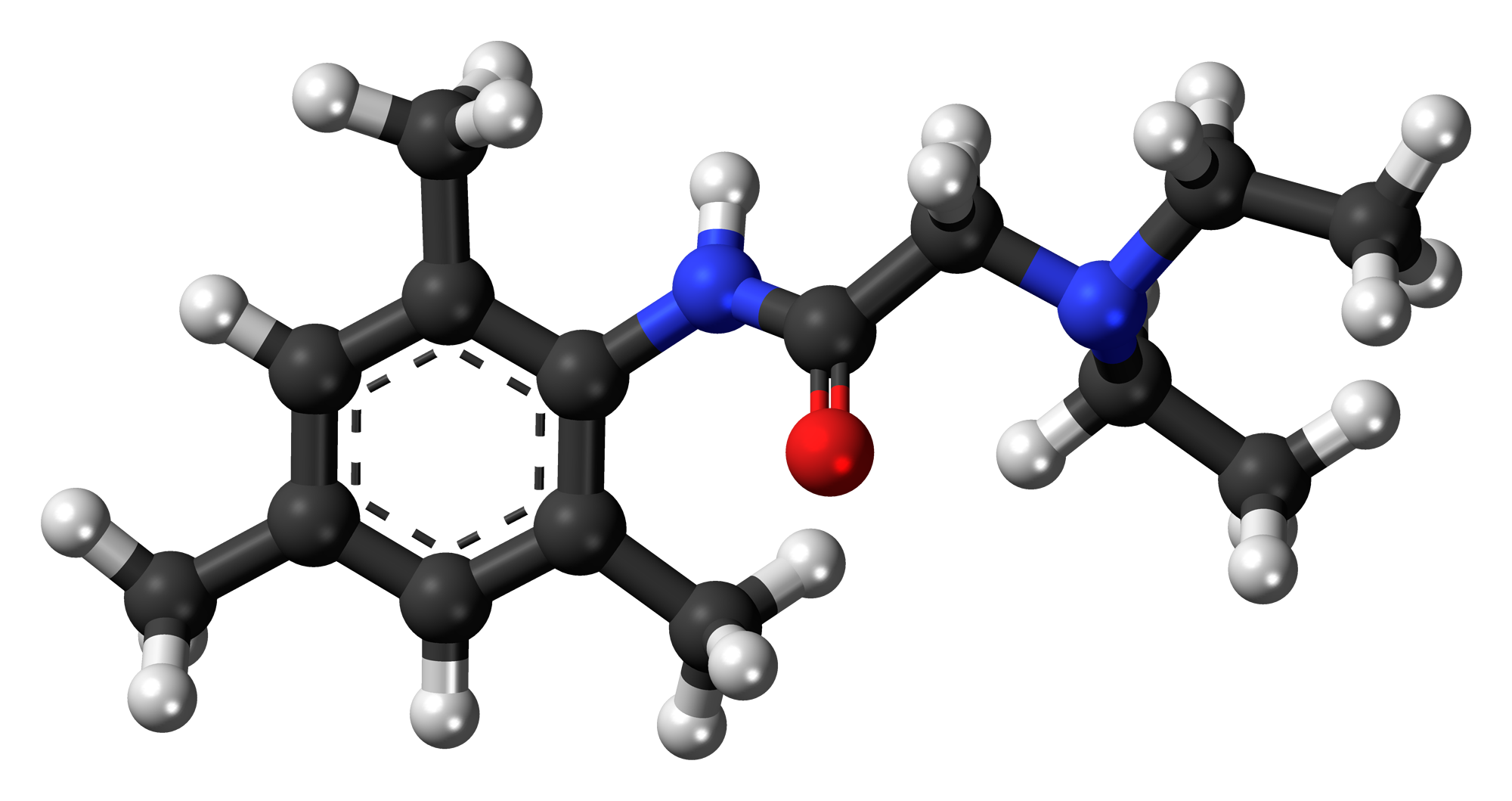

Names
- IUPAC name N^{2},N^{2}-Diethyl-N^{1}-(2,4,6-trimethylphenyl)glycinamide
- Systematic IUPAC name 2-(Diethylamino)-N-(2,4,6-trimethylphenyl)acetamide
- Other names N^{2},N^{2}-diethyl-N-mesitylglycinamide

Identifiers
CAS Number	616-68-2
3D model (JSmol)	Interactive image
ChemSpider	11533
ECHA InfoCard	100.009.535
EC Number	210-487-3
KEGG	D08640
MeSH	D014288
PubChem CID	12028
UNII	IN1233R0JO
CompTox Dashboard (EPA)	DTXSID6048410
- InChI: InChI=1S/C15H24N2O/c1-6-17(7-2)10-14(18)16-15-12(4)8-11(3)9-13(15)5/h8-9H,6-7,10H2,1-5H3,(H,16,18) Key: GOZBHBFUQHMKQB-UHFFFAOYSA-N
- SMILES: CCN(CC)CC(=O)NC1=C(C=C(C=C1C)C)C

Properties
Chemical formula	C_{15}H_{24}N_{2}O
Molar mass	248.36386
- Except where otherwise noted, data are given for materials in their standard state (at 25 °C [77 °F], 100 kPa). verify (what is ?) Infobox references

Trimecaine (systematic name (2,4,6-trimethylphenylcarbamoylmethyl)diethylammonium chloride, chemical formula C_{15}H_{25}ClN_{2}O) is an organic compound used as a local anesthetic and cardial antiarrhythmic. It is white crystalline powder readily soluble in water and ethanol. It is an active ingredient in products available under trademarks Mesdicain, Mesocain, Mesokain and others.

== History ==
Trimecaine is probably a Czech discovery (in light of complex pharmacological and clinical evaluation and practical deployment) although its preparation was published by Löfgren in 1946.

== Action mechanism, pharmacokinetics ==
Like other local anesthetics belonging in the amide group trimecaine decreases the cell membrane permeability, causes depolarization and shortens the action potential. Anesthetic effect starts within 15 minutes and remains 60–90 minutes. Its biological half-life is ca. 90 minutes. 10% of trimecaine is excreted unchanged (90% as its metabolites). It passes through the hematoencephalic and placental barriers.

== Indication ==
Trimecaine has two main application fields. The first one is local anesthesia (topical, infiltrational, topical mucosal and inhalational, spinal and Bier's intravenous). It is used in concentrations 0.4 up to 4%, in some cases (e.g. in stomatology) in mixtures with adrenaline. The other field is prophylaxis and therapy of ventriculous arrhythmia on myocardial infarction and in cardiosurgery. It is used also for prophylaxis of sympathetic reaction during tracheal intubations.

== Contraindication ==
Trimecaine must not be used at hypersensitivity on amide anesthetics, hypervolemia, hypotension, cardial conduction defects, asystole, cardiogenic shock and malignant hyperthermia in anamnesis.

== Adverse effects ==
Rarely allergic reactions may occur (from dermal or mucosal symptoms to anaphylactic shock). At overdosing a toxical reaction arises - excitation, agitation, dishevelment, visual defects, buzzing in ears, muscle thrill to tremor, in more severe cases somnolence, hyporeflexia, breathing defects to apnea, convulsions.
