= Local anesthetic =

Medications to reversibly block pain

Many local anesthetics fall into two general chemical classes, amino esters (top) and amino amides (bottom).

A local anesthetic (LA) is a medication that causes absence of all sensation (including pain) in a specific body part without loss of consciousness, providing local anesthesia, as opposed to a general anesthetic, which eliminates all sensation in the entire body and causes unconsciousness. Local anesthetics are most commonly used to eliminate pain during or after surgery. During local anesthesia, pain and temperature are the first senses to disappear, while pressure and motor function are the last to go. When it is used on specific nerve pathways (local anesthetic nerve block), paralysis (loss of muscle function) also can be induced.

== Classification ==
LAs are of 2 types:

- Clinical LAs:
  - amino amide LAs
  - amino ester LAs
- Synthetic LAs
  - Cocaine derivatives

Synthetic cocaine-derived LAs differ from cocaine because they have a much lower abuse potential and do not cause hypertension vasoconstriction (with few exceptions).

The suffix "-caine" at the ends of these medication names is derived from the word "cocaine", because cocaine was formerly used as a local anesthetic.

== Examples ==
Short Duration of Action and Low Potency

- Benzocaine
- Chloroprocaine
- Cocaine
- Procaine

Medium Duration of Action and Medium Potency

- Articaine
- Lidocaine
- Prilocaine

High Duration and High Potency

- Bupivacaine
- Cinchocaine
- Ropivacaine
- Tetracaine

== Medical uses ==
Local anesthetics may be used to prevent and/or treat acute pain, to treat chronic pain, and as a supplement to general anesthesia.

They are used in various techniques of local anesthesia such as:

- Topical anesthesia (surface anesthesia)
- Topical administration of cream, gel, ointment, liquid, or spray of anesthetic dissolved in DMSO or other solvents/carriers for deeper absorption
- Infiltration
- Brachial plexus block
- Epidural block (extradural)
- Spinal anesthesia (subarachnoid block)
- Iontophoresis
- Diagnostic purposes (e.g. dibucaine)
- Anti-arrhythmic agents (e.g. lidocaine).

=== Acute pain ===
Even though acute pain can be managed using analgesics, conduction anesthesia may be preferable because of superior pain control and fewer side effects. For purposes of pain therapy, LA drugs are often given by repeated injection or continuous infusion through a catheter. LA drugs are also often combined with other agents such as opioids for synergistic analgesic action. Low doses of LA drugs can be sufficient so that muscle weakness does not occur and patients may be mobilized.

Some typical uses of conduction anesthesia for acute pain are:

Type of pain	Possible treatments
Labor pain	Epidural anesthesia, Pudendal nerve blocks
Postoperative pain	Peripheral nerve blocks, epidural anesthesia
Trauma	Peripheral nerve blocks, intravenous regional anesthesia, epidural anesthesia

=== Chronic pain ===
Chronic pain is a complex and often serious condition that requires diagnosis and treatment by an expert in pain medicine. LAs can be applied repeatedly or continuously for prolonged periods to relieve chronic pain, usually in combination with medication such as opioids, NSAIDs, and anticonvulsants. Though it can be easily performed, repeated local anesthetic blocks in chronic pain conditions are not recommended as there is no evidence of long-term benefits.

=== Surgery ===
Virtually every part of the body can be anesthetized using conduction anesthesia. However, only a limited number of techniques are in common clinical use. Sometimes, conduction anesthesia is combined with general anesthesia or sedation for the patient's comfort and ease of surgery. However, many anesthetists, surgeons, patients and nurses believe that it is safer to perform major surgeries under local anesthesia than general anesthesia. Typical operations performed under conduction anesthesia include:

Type of surgery	Purposes or procedures
Dentistry	topical anesthesia (surface anesthesia), infiltration anesthesia and intraligamentary anesthesia during restorative operations such as fillings, crowns, and root canals, or extractions, and regional nerve blocks during extractions and surgeries
Podiatry (surgery of feet, ankles, and legs)	cutaneous anesthesia, nail avulsions, matricectomy, bunionectomy, hammertoe repair and various other podiatric procedures
Eye surgery	surface anesthesia with topical anesthetics or retrobulbar block during cataract removal or other ophthalmic procedures
Head and neck surgery (ENT operations)	infiltration anesthesia, field blocks, or peripheral nerve blocks, plexus anesthesia
Shoulder surgery Arm surgery	plexus anesthesia or intravenous regional anesthesia
Cardiac surgery (heart surgery); Pulmonary surgery (lung surgery)	epidural anesthesia combined with general anesthesia
Abdominal surgery	epidural anesthesia or spinal anesthesia, often combined with general anesthesia during inguinal hernia repair or other abdominal surgery
Gynecological surgery Obstetric surgery Urological surgery	spinal anesthesia or epidural anesthesia
Bone surgery and joint surgery of the pelvis, hip, and leg	spinal anaesthesia or epidural anesthesia, peripheral nerve blocks, or intravenous regional anesthesia
Skin surgery and peripheral vascular surgery	topical anesthesia, field blocks, peripheral nerve blocks, spinal anesthesia or epidural anesthesia

=== Diagnostic tests ===
Diagnostic tests such as bone marrow aspiration, lumbar puncture (spinal tap) and aspiration of cysts or other structures are made to be less painful upon administration of local anesthetic before insertion of larger needles.

=== Other uses ===
Local anesthesia is also used during insertion of IV devices, such as pacemakers and implantable defibrillators, ports used for giving chemotherapy medications and hemodialysis access catheters.

Topical anesthesia, in the form of lidocaine/prilocaine (EMLA) is most commonly used to enable relatively painless venipuncture (blood collection) and placement of intravenous cannulae. It may also be suitable for other kinds of punctures such as ascites drainage and amniocentesis.

Surface anesthesia also facilitates some endoscopic procedures such as bronchoscopy (visualization of the lower airways) or cystoscopy (visualization of the inner surface of the bladder)

== Side effects ==
=== Localized side effects ===
Edema of tongue, pharynx and larynx may develop as a side effect of local anesthesia. This could be caused by a variety of reasons including trauma during injection, infection, an allergic reaction, haematoma or injection of irritating solutions such as cold-sterilization solutions. Usually there is tissue swelling at the point of injection. This is due to puncturing of the vein which allows the blood to flow into loose tissues in the surrounding area. Blanching of the tissues in the area where the local anesthetic is deposited is also common. This gives the area a white appearance as the blood flow is prevented due to vasoconstriction of arteries in the area. The vasoconstriction stimulus gradually wears off and subsequently the tissue returns to normal in less than two hours.

The side effects of inferior alveolar nerve block include feeling tense, clenching of the fists and moaning.

The duration of soft tissue anesthesia is longer than pulpal anesthesia and is often associated with difficulty eating, drinking and speaking.

==== Risks ====
The risk of temporary or permanent nerve damage varies between different locations and types of nerve blocks.

There is risk of accidental damage to local blood vessels during injection of the local anesthetic solution. This is referred to as haematoma and could result in pain, trismus, swelling and/or discoloration of the region. The density of tissues surrounding the injured vessels is an important factor for hematoma. There is greatest chance of this occurring in a posterior superior alveolar nerve block or in a pterygomandibular block.

Giving local anesthesia to patients with liver disease can have significant consequences. Thorough evaluation of the disease should be carried out to assess potential risk to the patient as in significant liver dysfunction, the half-life of amide local anesthetic agents may be drastically increased thus increasing the risk of overdose.

Local anesthetics and vasoconstrictors may be administered to pregnant patients however it is very important to be extra cautious when giving a pregnant patient any type of drug. Lidocaine can be safely used but bupivacaine and mepivacaine should be avoided. Consultation with the obstetrician is vital before administering any type of local anesthetic to a pregnant patient.

==== Recovery ====
Permanent nerve damage after a peripheral nerve block is rare. Symptoms are likely to resolve within a few weeks. The vast majority of those affected (92–97%) recover within four to six weeks; 99% of these people have recovered within a year. An estimated one in 5,000 to 30,000 nerve blocks results in some degree of permanent persistent nerve damage.

Symptoms may continue to improve for up to 18 months following injury.

=== Potential side effects ===
General systemic adverse effects are due to the pharmacological effects of the anesthetic agents used. The conduction of electric impulses follows a similar mechanism in peripheral nerves, the central nervous system, and the heart. The effects of local anesthetics are, therefore, not specific for the signal conduction in peripheral nerves. Side effects on the central nervous system and the heart may be severe and potentially fatal. However, toxicity usually occurs only at plasma levels which are rarely reached if proper anesthetic techniques are adhered to. High plasma levels might arise, for example, when doses intended for epidural or intrasupport tissue administration are accidentally delivered as intravascular injection.

==== Emotional reactions ====
When patients are emotionally affected in the form of nervousness or fear, it can lead to vasovagal collapse. This is the anticipation of pain during administration that activates the parasympathetic nervous system while inhibiting the orthosympathetic nervous system. What results is a dilation of arteries in muscles which can lead to a reduction in circulating blood volume inducing a temporary shortness of blood flow to the brain. Notable symptoms include restlessness, visibly looking pale, perspiration and possible loss of consciousness. In severe cases, clonic cramps resembling an epileptic insult may occur.

On the other hand, fear of administration can also result in accelerated, shallow breathing, or hyperventilation. The patient may feel a tingling sensation in hands and feet or a sense of light-headedness and increased chest pressure.

Hence, it is crucial for the medical professional administrating the local anesthesia, especially in the form of an injection, to ensure that the patient is in a comfortable setting and has any potential fears alleviated in order to avoid these possible complications.

==== Central nervous system ====
Depending on local tissue concentrations of local anesthetics, excitatory or depressant effects on the central nervous system may occur.

Initial symptoms of systemic toxicity include ringing in the ears (tinnitus), a metallic taste in the mouth, tingling or numbness of the mouth, dizziness and/or disorientation.

At higher concentrations, a relatively selective depression of inhibitory neurons results in cerebral excitation, which may lead to more advanced symptoms include motor twitching in the periphery followed by grand mal seizures. It is reported that seizures are more likely to occur when bupivacaine is used, particularly in combination with chloroprocaine.

A profound depression of brain functions may occur at even higher concentrations which may lead to coma, respiratory arrest, and death. Such tissue concentrations may be due to very high plasma levels after intravenous injection of a large dose.

Another possibility is direct exposure of the central nervous system through the cerebrospinal fluid, i.e., overdose in spinal anesthesia or accidental injection into the subarachnoid space in epidural anesthesia.

==== Cardiovascular system ====
Cardiac toxicity can result from improper injection of agent into a vessel. Even with proper administration, it is inevitable for some diffusion of agent into the body from the site of application due to unforeseeable anatomical idiosyncrasies of the patient. This may affect the nervous system or cause the agent to enter into general circulation. However, infections are very seldom transmitted.

Cardiac toxicity associated with overdose of intravascular injection of local anesthetic is characterized by hypotension, atrioventricular conduction delay, idioventricular rhythms, and eventual cardiovascular collapse. Although all local anesthetics potentially shorten the myocardial refractory period, bupivacaine blocks the cardiac sodium channels, thereby making it most likely to precipitate malignant arrhythmias. Even levobupivacaine and ropivacaine (single-enantiomer derivatives), developed to ameliorate cardiovascular side effects, still harbor the potential to disrupt cardiac function. Toxicity from anesthetic combinations is additive.

==== Endocrine ====
Endocrine and metabolic systems only have slightly adverse effects with most cases being without clinical repercussions.

==== Immunologic allergy ====
Adverse reactions to local anesthetics (especially the esters) are not uncommon, but legitimate allergies are very rare. Allergic reactions to the esters is usually due to a sensitivity to their metabolite, para-aminobenzoic acid, and does not result in cross-allergy to amides. Therefore, amides can be used as alternatives in those patients. Nonallergic reactions may resemble allergy in their manifestations. In some cases, skin tests and provocative challenge may be necessary to establish a diagnosis of allergy. Also cases of allergy to paraben derivatives occur, which are often added as preservatives to local anesthetic solutions.

==== Methemoglobinemia ====
Methemoglobinemia is a process where iron in hemoglobin is altered, reducing its oxygen-carrying capability, which produces cyanosis and symptoms of hypoxia. Exposure to aniline group chemicals such as lidocaine, prilocaine, and especially benzocaine, can produce this effect. The systemic toxicity of prilocaine is comparatively low, but its metabolite, o-toluidine, is known to cause methemoglobinemia.

==== Second-generation effects ====
Application of local anesthetics during oocyte removal during in vitro fertilization has been up to debate. Pharmacological concentrations of anesthetic agents have been found in follicular fluid. Clinical trials have not concluded any effects on pregnant women. However, there is some concern with the behavioral effects of lidocaine on offspring in rats.

During pregnancy, it is not common for local anesthetics to have any adverse effect on the fetus. Despite this, risks of toxicity may be higher in pregnancy due to an increase in unbound fraction of local anesthetic and physiological changes increase the transfer of local anesthetic into the central nervous system. Hence, it is recommended that pregnant women use a lower dose of local anesthetic to reduce any potential complications.

==== Treatment of overdose: "Lipid rescue" ====
Lipid emulsion therapy or lipid rescue is a method of toxicity treatment that was invented by Dr. Guy Weinberg in 1998, and was not widely used until after the first published successful rescue in 2006. Evidence indicates Intralipid, a commonly available intravenous lipid emulsion, can be effective in treating severe cardiotoxicity secondary to local anesthetic overdose, including human case reports. However, the evidence at this point is still limited.

Though most case reports to date have recorded most common use of Intralipid, other emulsions, such as Liposyn and Medialipid, have also been shown effective.

Ample supporting animal evidence and human case reports show successful use of lipid rescue in this way. In the UK, efforts have been made to publicize lipid rescue more widely. In 2010, lipid rescue had been officially promoted as a treatment of local anesthetic toxicity by the Association of Anaesthetists of Great Britain and Ireland. One published case has been reported of successful treatment of refractory cardiac arrest in bupropion and lamotrigine overdose using lipid emulsion.

The design of a 'homemade' lipid rescue kit consisting of a standard lipid injection, IV tubing, syringes, and needles has been described.

Although lipid rescue mechanism of action is not completely understood, the added lipid in the blood stream may act as a sink, allowing for the removal of lipophilic toxins from affected tissues. This theory is compatible with two studies on lipid rescue for clomipramine toxicity in rabbits and with a clinical report on the use of lipid rescue in veterinary medicine to treat a puppy with moxidectin toxicosis.

== Mechanism of action ==
All LAs are membrane-stabilizing drugs; they reversibly decrease the rate of depolarization and repolarization of excitable membranes (like nociceptors). Though many other drugs also have membrane-stabilizing properties, not all are used as LAs (propranolol, for example, though it has LA properties). LA drugs act mainly by inhibiting sodium influx through sodium-specific ion channels in the neuronal cell membrane, in particular voltage-gated sodium channels. When the influx of sodium is interrupted, an action potential cannot arise and signal conduction is inhibited. The receptor site is thought to be located at the cytoplasmic (inner) portion of the sodium channel. Local anesthetic drugs bind more readily to sodium channels in an activated state, thus onset of neuronal blockade is faster in rapidly firing neurons. This is referred to as state-dependent blockade.

LAs are weak bases and are usually formulated as the hydrochloride salt to render them water-soluble. At a pH equal to the protonated base's pKa, the protonated (ionized) and unprotonated (un-ionized) forms of the molecule exist in equimolar amounts, but only the unprotonated base diffuses readily across cell membranes. Once inside the cell, the local anesthetic will be in equilibrium, with the formation of the protonated (ionized) form, which does not readily pass back out of the cell. This is referred to as "ion-trapping". In the protonated form, the molecule binds to the LA binding site on the inside of the ion channel near the cytoplasmic end. Most LAs work on the internal surface of the membrane - the drug has to penetrate the cell membrane, which is achieved best in the nonionised form. This is exemplified by the permanently ionised LA RAC 421-II which cannot diffuse across the cell membrane but, if injected into the cytosol of a nerve fibre, can induce NaKATPase blockage and anesthetic effects.

Acidosis such as caused by inflammation at a wound partly reduces the action of LAs. This is partly because most of the anesthetic is ionized and therefore unable to cross the cell membrane to reach its cytoplasmic-facing site of action on the sodium channel.

=== Sensitivity of nerve fibers to local anesthetics ===
For most patients, administration of local anesthetics causes the sensation of pain to be lost first, followed by temperature, touch, deep pressure, and finally motor function. The sensitivity of nerve fibers to blockade depends on a combination of diameter and myelination. Their different sensitivities to LA blockade is termed differential blockade. Myelinated fibers are more sensitive to blockade as they are interrupted by nodes of Ranvier, thus interruption of only consecutive nodes of Ranvier will prevent action potential propagation. In turn, in unmyelinated nerves, an entire length needs to be blocked. Regarding diameter, the generally accepted principle is that susceptibility to local anesthesia depends inversely on fiber diameter.

In general, autonomic fibers Type B fibers, small unmyelinated type C (pain sensation), and small myelinated Aδ fibers (pain and temperature sensations) are blocked before the larger myelinated Aγ, Aβ, and Aα fibers (mediating postural, touch, pressure, and motor information).

== Techniques ==
Local anesthetics can block almost every nerve between the peripheral nerve endings and the central nervous system. The most peripheral technique is topical anesthesia to the skin or other body surface. Small and large peripheral nerves can be anesthetized individually (peripheral nerve block) or in anatomic nerve bundles (plexus anesthesia). Spinal anesthesia and epidural anesthesia merge into the central nervous system.

Injection of LAs is often painful. A number of methods can be used to decrease this pain, including buffering of the solution with bicarbonate and warming.

Clinical techniques include:

- Surface anesthesia is the application of an LA spray, solution, or cream to the skin or a mucous membrane; the effect is short lasting and is limited to the area of contact.
- Infiltration anesthesia is infiltration of LA into the tissue to be anesthetized; surface and infiltration anesthesia are collectively topical anesthesia
- Field block is subcutaneous injection of an LA in an area bordering on the field to be anesthetized.
- Peripheral nerve block is injection of LA in the vicinity of a peripheral nerve to anesthetize that nerve's area of innervation.
- Plexus anesthesia is injection of LA in the vicinity of a nerve plexus, often inside a tissue compartment that limits the diffusion of the drug away from the intended site of action. The anesthetic effect extends to the innervation areas of several or all nerves stemming from the plexus.
- Epidural anesthesia is an LA injected into the epidural space, where it acts primarily on the spinal nerve roots; depending on the site of injection and the volume injected, the anesthetized area varies from limited areas of the abdomen or chest to large regions of the body.
- Spinal anesthesia is an LA injected into the cerebrospinal fluid, usually at the lumbar spine (in the lower back), where it acts on spinal nerve roots and part of the spinal cord; the resulting anesthesia usually extends from the legs to the abdomen or chest.
- Intravenous regional anesthesia (Bier's block) is when blood circulation of a limb is interrupted using a tourniquet (a device similar to a blood-pressure cuff), then a large volume of LA is injected into a peripheral vein. The drug fills the limb's venous system and diffuses into tissues, where peripheral nerves and nerve endings are anesthetized. The anesthetic effect is limited to the area that is excluded from blood circulation and resolves quickly once circulation is restored.
- Local anesthesia of body cavities includes intrapleural anesthesia and intra-articular anesthesia.

- Transincision (or transwound) catheter anesthesia uses a multilumen catheter inserted through an incision or wound and aligned across it on the inside as the incision or wound is closed, providing continuous administration of local anesthetic along the incision or wounds

Dental-specific techniques include:

=== Vazirani–Akinosi technique ===
The Vazirani–Akinosi technique is also known as the closed-mouth mandibular nerve block. It is mostly used in patients who have limited opening of the mandible or in those that have trismus; spasm of the muscles of mastication. The nerves which are anesthetised in this technique are the inferior alveolar, incisive, mental, lingual and mylohyoid nerves.

Dental needles are available in two lengths, short and long. As Vazirani–Akinosi is a local anesthetic technique which requires penetration of a significant thickness of soft tissues, a long needle is used. The needle is inserted into the soft tissue which covers the medial border of the mandibular ramus, in region of the inferior alveolar, lingual and mylohyoid nerves. The positioning of the bevel of the needle is very important as it must be positioned away from the bone of the mandibular ramus and instead towards the midline.

=== Intraligamentary Infiltration ===
Intraligamentary infiltration, also known as periodontal ligament injection or intraligamentary injection (ILI), is known as "the most universal of the supplemental injections". ILIs are usually administered when inferior alveolar nerve block techniques are inadequate or ineffective. ILIs are purposed for:

1. Single-tooth anesthesia
2. Low anesthetic dose
3. Contraindication for systemic anesthesia
4. Presence of systemic health problems

ILI utilization is expected to increase because dental patients prefer fewer soft tissue anesthesia and dentists aim to reduce administration of traditional inferior alveolar nerve block (INAB) for routine restorative procedures.

Injection methodology: The periodontal ligament space provides an accessible route to the cancellous alveolar bone, and the anesthetic reaches the pulpal nerve via natural perforation of intraoral bone tissue.

Advantages of ILI over INAB: rapid onset (within 30 seconds), small dosage required (0.2–1.0 mL), limited area of numbness, lower intrinsic risks such as neuropathy, hematoma, trismus/jaw sprain and self-inflicted periodontal tissue injury, as well as decreased cardiovascular disturbances. Its usage as a secondary or supplementary anesthesia on the mandible has reported a high success rate of above 90%.

Disadvantages: Risk of temporary periodontal tissue damage, likelihood of bacteriemia and endocarditis for at-risk populations, appropriate pressure and correct needle placement are imperative for anesthetic success, short duration of pulpal anesthesia limits the use of ILIs for several restorative procedures that require longer duration, postoperative discomfort, and injury on unerupted teeth such as enamel hypoplasia and defects.

Technique description:

- All plaque and calculus to be eradicated, optimally before the operative visit to assist gingival tissue healing.
- Before injection, disinfect gingival sulcus with 0.2% chlorhexidine solution.
- Administration of soft tissue anesthesia is recommended prior to ILI administration. This helps to enhance patient comfort.
- Needle gauges of sizes 27-gauge short or 30-gauge ultra-short needle are usually utilized.
- The needle is inserted along the long axis, at a 30 degree angle, of the mesial or distal root for single rooted teeth and on the mesial and distal roots of multi-rooted teeth. Bevel orientation toward the root provides easier advancement of the needle apically.
- When the needle reaches between the root and crestal bone, significant resistance is experience.
- Anesthetic deposition is recommended at 0.2 mL, per root or site, over minimally 20 seconds.
- For its success, the anesthetic must be administered under pressure. It must not leak out of the sulcus into the mouth.
- Withdraw needle for minimally 10–15 seconds to permit complete deposition of solution. This can be slower than other injections as there is pressure build-up from the anesthetic administration.
- Blanching of the tissue is observed and may be more evident when vasoconstrictors are used. It is caused by a temporary obstruction of blood flow to the tissue.

Syringes:

- Standard syringes can be used.
- The intraligamentary syringe offers mechanical advantage by using a trigger-grasp or click apparatus to employ a gear or lever that improves control and results in increased force to push the anesthetic cartridge's rubber stopper forward for medication deposition with greater ease.
- C-CLADs (computer controlled local anesthetic delivery devices) can be used. Its usage of computer microprocessors allows for control of fluid dynamics and anesthetic deposition. This minimizes subjective flow rates and variability in pressure. This thereby results in enhanced hydrodynamic diffusion of solution into bone or the target area of deposition, thus permitting larger amounts of anesthetic solution to be delivered during ILIs without increased tissue damage.

Things to note:

- ILIs are not recommended for patients with active periodontal inflammation.
- ILIs should not be administered at tooth sites with 5 mm or more of periodontal attachment loss.

=== Gow-Gates Technique ===
Gow-Gates technique is used to provide anesthetics to the mandible of the patient's mouth. With the aid of extra and intraoral landmarks, the needle is injected into the intraoral latero-anterior surface of the condyle, steering clear below the insertion of the lateral pterygoid muscle. The extraoral landmarks used for this technique are the lower border of the ear tragus, corners of the mouth and the angulation of the tragus on the side of the face.

Biophysical forces (pulsation of the maxillary artery, muscular function of jaw movement) and gravity will aid with the diffusion of anesthetic to fill the whole pterygomandibular space. All three oral sensory parts of the mandibular branch of the trigeminal nerve and other sensory nerves in the region will come in contact with the anesthetic and this reduces the need to anesthetise supplementary innervation.

In comparison to other regional block methods of anestheising the lower jaw, the Gow-Gates technique has a higher success rate in fully anesthetising the lower jaw. One study found that out of 1,200 patients receiving injections through the Gow-Gates technique, only 2 of them did not obtain complete anesthesia.

== Types ==
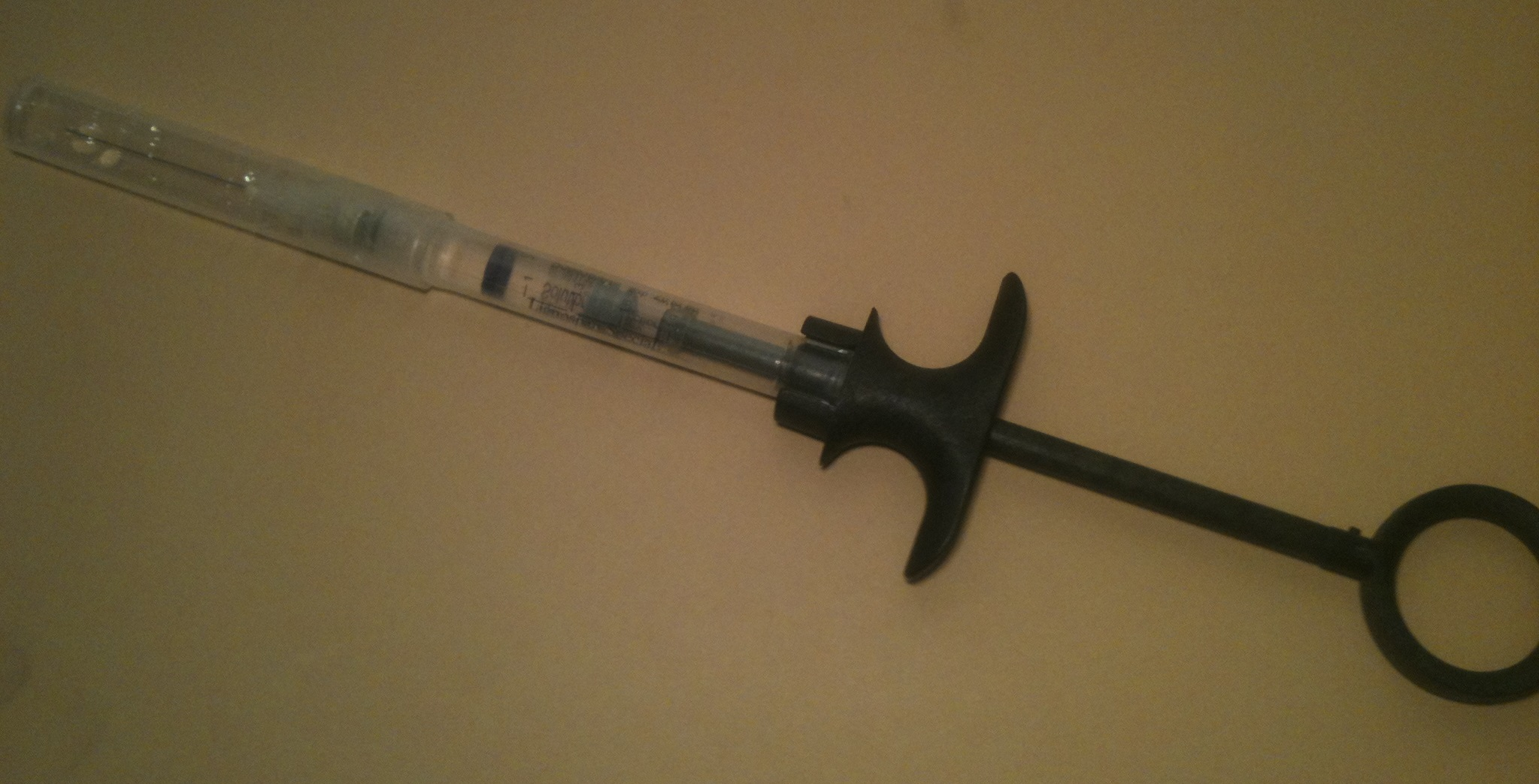
This LA system is designed to prevent needlestick injury. A cartridge of LA fits into the disposable needle, which can be locked when not in use and can be separated from the handle.

Local anesthetic solutions for injection typically consist of:

- The local anesthetic agent itself
- A vehicle, which is usually water-based or just sterile water
- Vasoconstrictor possibly (see below)
- Reducing agent (antioxidant), e.g. if epinephrine is used, then sodium metabisulfite is used as a reducing agent
- Preservative, e.g. methylparaben
- Buffer

Esters are prone to producing allergic reactions, which may necessitate the use of an amide. The names of each locally clinical anesthetic have the suffix "-caine". Most ester LAs are metabolized by pseudocholinesterase, while amide LAs are metabolized in the liver. This can be a factor in choosing an agent in patients with liver failure, although since cholinesterases are produced in the liver, physiologically (e.g. very young or very old individual) or pathologically (e.g. cirrhosis) impaired hepatic metabolism is also a consideration when using esters.

Sometimes, LAs are combined, e.g.:

- Lidocaine/prilocaine (EMLA, eutectic mixture of local anesthetic)
- Lidocaine/tetracaine (Rapydan)
- TAC

LA solutions for injection are sometimes mixed with vasoconstrictors (combination drug) to increase the duration of local anesthesia by constricting the blood vessels, thereby safely concentrating the anesthetic agent for an extended duration, as well as reducing hemorrhage. Because the vasoconstrictor temporarily reduces the rate at which the systemic circulation removes the local anesthetic from the area of the injection, the maximum doses of LAs when combined with a vasoconstrictor is higher compared to the same LA without any vasoconstrictor. Occasionally, cocaine is administered for this purpose. Examples include:

- Prilocaine hydrochloride and epinephrine (trade name Citanest Forte)
- Lidocaine, bupivacaine, and epinephrine (recommended final concentrations of 0.5, 0.25, and 0.5%, respectively)
- Iontocaine, consisting of lidocaine and epinephrine
- Septocaine (trade name Septodont), a combination of articaine and epinephrine

One combination product of this type is used topically for surface anaesthesia, TAC (5–12% tetracaine,^{1}/_{2000} (0.05%, 500 ppm, 1/2 per mille) adrenaline, 4 or 10% cocaine).

Using LA with vasoconstrictor is safe in regions supplied by end arteries. The commonly held belief that LA with vasoconstrictor can cause necrosis in extremities such as the nose, ears, fingers, and toes (due to constriction of end arteries), is invalidated, since no case of necrosis has been reported since the introduction of commercial lidocaine with epinephrine in 1948.

=== Ester group ===
Procaine

- Benzocaine
- Chloroprocaine
- Cocaine
- Cyclomethycaine
- Dimethocaine (Larocaine)
- Oxybuprocaine
- Piperocaine
- Propoxycaine
- Procaine (Novocaine)
- Proparacaine
- Tetracaine (Amethocaine)

=== Amide group ===
Lidocaine

- Articaine
- Bupivacaine
- Cinchocaine (Dibucaine)
- Etidocaine
- Levobupivacaine
- Lidocaine (Lignocaine)
- Mepivacaine
- Prilocaine
- Ropivacaine
- Trimecaine

=== Naturally derived ===
Tetrodotoxin

- Saxitoxin
- Neosaxitoxin
- Tetrodotoxin
- Menthol
- Eugenol
- Cocaine
- Spilanthol

Most naturally occurring local anesthetics with the exceptions of menthol, eugenol and cocaine are neurotoxins, and have the suffix -toxin in their names. Cocaine binds the intracellular side of the channels while saxitoxin, neosaxitoxin and tetrodotoxin bind to the extracellular side of sodium channels.

== History ==
In Peru, the ancient Incas are believed to have used the leaves of the coca plant as a local anesthetic in addition to its stimulant properties. It was also used for slave payment and is thought to play a role in the subsequent destruction of Incas culture when Spaniards realized the effects of chewing the coca leaves and took advantage of it. Cocaine was first used as a local anesthetic in 1884. The search for a less toxic and less addictive substitute led to the development of the aminoester local anesthetics stovaine in 1903 and procaine in 1904. Since then, several synthetic local anesthetic drugs have been developed and put into clinical use, notably lidocaine in 1943, bupivacaine in 1957, and prilocaine in 1959.

The invention of clinical use of local anaesthesia is credited to the Vienna School which included Sigmund Freud (1856-1939), Carl Koller (1857-1944) and Leopold Konigstein (1850–1942). They introduced local anaesthesia, using cocaine, through 'self-experimation' on their oral mucosa before introducing it to animal or human experimentation. The Vienna school first started using cocaine as local anaesthesia in ophthalmology and it was later incorporated into ophthalmologic practice. Dr. Halsted and Dr. Hall, in the United States in 1885 described an intraoral anesthetic technique of blocking the inferior alveolar nerve and the antero-superior dental nerve using 4% cocaine.

Shortly after the first use of cocaine for topical anesthesia, blocks on peripheral nerves were described. Brachial plexus anesthesia by percutaneous injection through axillary and supraclavicular approaches was developed in the early 20th century. The search for the most effective and least traumatic approach for plexus anesthesia and peripheral nerve blocks continues to this day. In recent decades, continuous regional anesthesia using catheters and automatic pumps has evolved as a method of pain therapy.

Intravenous regional anesthesia was first described by August Bier in 1908. This technique is still in use and is remarkably safe when drugs of low systemic toxicity such as prilocaine are used.

Spinal anesthesia was first used in 1885, but not introduced into clinical practice until 1899, when August Bier subjected himself to a clinical experiment in which he observed the anesthetic effect, but also the typical side effect of postpunctural headache. Within a few years, spinal anesthesia became widely used for surgical anesthesia and was accepted as a safe and effective technique. Although atraumatic (noncutting-tip) cannulae and modern drugs are used today, the technique has otherwise changed very little over many decades.

Epidural anesthesia by a caudal approach had been known in the early 20th century, but a well-defined technique using lumbar injection was not developed until 1921, when Fidel Pagés published his article "Anestesia Metamérica". This technique was popularized in the 1930s and 1940s by Achile Mario Dogliotti. With the advent of thin, flexible catheters, continuous infusion and repeated injections have become possible, making epidural anesthesia still a highly successful technique. Besides its many uses for surgery, epidural anesthesia is particularly popular in obstetrics for the treatment of labor pain.

== See also ==
- Amylocaine
- Anesthetic
- General anesthetic
- List of cocaine analogues
- List of local anesthetics
