= February 23 =

February 23 this year in various calendars
- Monday, 23 February 2026
Other calendars
Akan	Nwonadwo
Armenian	8 Areg 1475
Aztec	Tecuilhuitontli 4, 6 Malīnalli
Babylonian	5 Shabatu, 2336 SE
Balinese pawukon	Luang, Pepet, Beteng, Menala, Umanis, Aryang, Coma of Bala, Uma, Ogan, Raksasa
Bengali	10 Falgun, BS 1432
Chinese	Yang Earth Dragon・Net Mansion; 7 Zhēngyuè, Bǐngwǔnián (Yushui, 10 days until Jingzhe)
Common Era	23 February 2026 CE
Coptic	16 Meshir, AM 1742
Egyptian	13 Epiphi, 2774 NE
Ethiopian	16 Yakātit, 2018 Amätä Məhrät
French Republican	Décade I, Quintidi de Ventôse de l'Année 234 de la République
Gregorian	23 February, AD 2026
Hebrew	6 Adar, AM 5786
Hindu	Bharaṇī・Brahman; Solar: 11 Phālguna, 1947 SE; Lunisolar: Ṣaṣṭhī, Śukla pakṣa of Phālguna, 2082 VE; Rāudra・5126 KY・1,872,629
Icelandic	Mánudagur, 2 Góa 2025
Islamic	6 Ramadan, AH 1447 (using tabular method)
ISO week date	2026-W09-1
Japanese	7 Mutsuki, Reiwa 8 (Usui, 10 days until Keichitsu)
Julian	10 February, AD 2026 (AM 7534)
Julian day	2461095
Maya	13.0.13.6.12; 10 Kayab, 6 Eb
Roman	ante diem IV Idus Februarias, MMDCCLXXIX AUC
Solar Hijri	4 Esfand, SH 1404
Tibetan	6 mchu, me pho rta 2153 or 1772 or 1000

<<	February					>>
Su	Mo	Tu	We	Th	Fr	Sa
1	2	3	4	5	6	7
8	9	10	11	12	13	14
15	16	17	18	19	20	21
22	23	24	25	26	27	28
2026

February 23 in recent years
2026 (Monday)
2025 (Sunday)
2024 (Friday)
2023 (Thursday)
2022 (Wednesday)
2021 (Tuesday)
2020 (Sunday)
2019 (Saturday)
2018 (Friday)
2017 (Thursday)

February 23 is the 54th day of the year in the Gregorian calendar; 311 days remain until the end of the year (312 in leap years).

== Events ==
=== Pre-1600 ===
- 303 – Roman emperor Diocletian orders the destruction of the Christian church in Nicomedia, beginning eight years of Diocletianic Persecution.
- 532 – Byzantine emperor Justinian I lays the foundation stone of a new Orthodox Christian basilica in Constantinople – the Hagia Sophia.
- 628 – Khosrow II, Shahanshah of the Sasanian Empire, is overthrown.
- 705 – Empress Wu Zetian abdicates the throne, restoring the Tang dynasty.
- 1455 – Traditionally the date of publication of the Gutenberg Bible, the first Western book printed with movable type.

=== 1601–1900 ===
- 1725 – J. S. Bach leads his Tafel-Music Shepherd Cantata for the birthday of Christian, Duke of Saxe-Weissenfels.
- 1763 – Berbice slave uprising in Guyana: The first major slave revolt in South America.
- 1778 – American Revolutionary War: Baron von Steuben arrives at Valley Forge, Pennsylvania, to help train the Continental Army.
- 1820 – Cato Street Conspiracy: A plot to murder all the British cabinet ministers is exposed and the conspirators arrested.
- 1836 – Texas Revolution: The Siege of the Alamo (prelude to the Battle of the Alamo) begins in San Antonio, Texas.
- 1847 – Mexican–American War: Battle of Buena Vista: In Mexico, American troops under future president General Zachary Taylor defeat Mexican General Antonio López de Santa Anna.
- 1854 – The official independence of the Orange Free State, South Africa is declared.
- 1861 – President-elect Abraham Lincoln arrives secretly in Washington, D.C., after the thwarting of an alleged assassination plot in Baltimore, Maryland.
- 1870 – Reconstruction Era: Post-U.S. Civil War military control of Mississippi ends and it is readmitted to the Union.
- 1883 – Alabama becomes the first U.S. state to enact an anti-trust law.
- 1885 – Sino-French War: French Army gains an important victory in the Battle of Đồng Đăng in the Tonkin region of Vietnam.
- 1886 – Charles Martin Hall produced the first samples of aluminium from the electrolysis of aluminium oxide, after several years of intensive work. He was assisted in this project by his older sister, Julia Brainerd Hall.
- 1887 – The French Riviera is hit by a large earthquake, killing around 2,000.
- 1898 – Émile Zola is imprisoned in France after writing J'Accuse...!, a letter accusing the French government of antisemitism and wrongfully imprisoning Captain Alfred Dreyfus.
- 1900 – Second Boer War: During the Battle of the Tugela Heights, the first British attempt to take Hart's Hill fails.

=== 1901–present ===
- 1903 – Cuba leases Guantánamo Bay to the United States "in perpetuity".
- 1905 – Chicago attorney Paul Harris and three other businessmen meet for lunch to form the Rotary Club, the world's first service club.
- 1909 – The AEA Silver Dart makes the first powered flight in Canada and the British Empire.
- 1917 – First demonstrations in Saint Petersburg, Russia. The beginning of the February Revolution (March 8 in the Gregorian calendar).
- 1927 – U.S. President Calvin Coolidge signs a bill by Congress establishing the Federal Radio Commission (later replaced by the Federal Communications Commission) which was to regulate the use of radio frequencies in the United States.
- 1927 – German theoretical physicist Werner Heisenberg writes a letter to fellow physicist Wolfgang Pauli, in which he describes his uncertainty principle for the first time.
- 1934 – Leopold III becomes King of Belgium.
- 1941 – Plutonium is first produced and isolated by Dr. Glenn T. Seaborg.
- 1942 – World War II: Japanese submarines fire artillery shells at the coastline near Santa Barbara, California.
- 1943 – The Cavan Orphanage fire kills thirty-five girls and an elderly cook.
- 1943 – Greek Resistance: The United Panhellenic Organization of Youth is founded in Greece.
- 1944 – The Soviet Union begins the forced deportation of the Chechen and Ingush people from the North Caucasus to Central Asia.
- 1945 – World War II: During the Battle of Iwo Jima, a group of United States Marines reach the top of Mount Suribachi on the island and are photographed raising the American flag.
- 1945 – World War II: The 11th Airborne Division, with Filipino guerrillas, free all 2,147 captives of the Los Baños internment camp, in what General Colin Powell later would refer to as "the textbook airborne operation for all ages and all armies".
- 1945 – World War II: The capital of the Philippines, Manila, is liberated by combined Filipino and American forces.
- 1945 – World War II: Capitulation of German garrison in Poznań. The city is liberated by Soviet and Polish forces.
- 1945 – World War II: The German town of Pforzheim is annihilated in a raid by 379 British bombers.
- 1945 – American Airlines Flight 009 crashes near Rural Retreat, Virginia, killing 17.
- 1947 – International Organization for Standardization is founded.
- 1950 – General elections are held in the United Kingdom.
- 1954 – The first mass inoculation of children against polio with the Salk vaccine begins in Pittsburgh.
- 1958 – Five-time Argentine Formula One champion Juan Manuel Fangio is kidnapped by rebels involved in the Cuban Revolution, on the eve of the Cuban Grand Prix. He was released the following day after the race.
- 1966 – In Syria, Ba'ath Party member Salah Jadid leads an intra-party military coup that replaces the previous government of General Amin al-Hafiz, also a Baathist.
- 1971 – Operation Lam Son 719: South Vietnamese General Do Cao Tri was killed in a helicopter crash en route to taking control of the faltering campaign.
- 1974 – The Symbionese Liberation Army demands $4 million more to release kidnap victim Patty Hearst.
- 1980 – Iran hostage crisis: Supreme Leader Ayatollah Ruhollah Khomeini states that Iran's parliament will decide the fate of the American embassy hostages.
- 1981 – In Spain, Antonio Tejero attempts a coup d'état by capturing the Spanish Congress of Deputies.
- 1983 – The United States Environmental Protection Agency announces its intent to buy out and evacuate the dioxin-contaminated community of Times Beach, Missouri.
- 1987 – Supernova 1987a is seen in the Large Magellanic Cloud.
- 1988 – Saddam Hussein begins the Anfal genocide against Kurds and Assyrians in northern Iraq.
- 1991 – In Thailand, General Sunthorn Kongsompong leads a bloodless coup d'état, deposing Prime Minister Chatichai Choonhavan.
- 1998 – In the United States, tornadoes in central Florida destroy or damage 2,600 structures and kill 42 people.
- 1999 – Kurdish rebel leader Abdullah Öcalan is charged with treason in Ankara, Turkey.
- 1999 – An avalanche buries the town of Galtür, Austria, killing 31.
- 2002 – An Ariane 4 rocket is launched from the Guiana Space Centre carrying Intelsat 904.
- 2007 – A train derails on an evening express service near Grayrigg, Cumbria, England, killing one person and injuring 88. This results in hundreds of points being checked over the UK after a few similar accidents.
- 2008 – A United States Air Force B-2 Spirit bomber crashes on Guam, marking the first operational loss of a B-2.
- 2008 – The Japanese WINDS satellite is launched.
- 2010 – Unknown criminals pour more than 2 1/2 million liters of diesel oil and other hydrocarbons into the river Lambro, in northern Italy, sparking an environmental disaster.
- 2012 – A series of attacks across Iraq leave at least 83 killed and more than 250 injured.
- 2017 – The Turkish-backed Free Syrian Army captures Al-Bab from ISIL.
- 2018 – Parliamentary elections are held in Djibouti.
- 2019 – Atlas Air Flight 3591, a Boeing 767 freighter, crashes into Trinity Bay near Anahuac, Texas, killing all three people on board.
- 2020 – Ahmaud Arbery, a 25-year-old African-American citizen, is shot and murdered by three white men after visiting a house under construction while jogging at a neighborhood in Satilla Shores near Brunswick in Glynn County, Georgia.
- 2021 – Four simultaneous prison riots leave at least 62 people dead in Ecuador.
- 2025 – A snap election is held in Germany.

== Births ==
=== Pre-1600 ===
- 1133 – Al-Zafir, Fatimid caliph (died 1154)
- 1417 – Pope Paul II (died 1471)
- 1417 – Louis IX, Duke of Bavaria (died 1479)
- 1443 – Matthias Corvinus, Hungarian king (died 1490)
- 1529 – Onofrio Panvinio, Italian historian (died 1568)
- 1539 – Henry XI of Legnica, thrice Duke of Legnica (died 1588)
- 1539 – Salima Sultan Begum, Empress of the Mughal Empire (died 1612)
- 1583 – Jean-Baptiste Morin, French mathematician, astrologer, and astronomer (died 1656)
- 1592 – Balthazar Gerbier, Dutch painter (died 1663)

=== 1601–1900 ===
- 1606 – George Frederick of Nassau-Siegen, officer in the Dutch Army (died 1674)
- 1633 – Samuel Pepys, English diarist and politician (died 1703)
- 1646 – Tokugawa Tsunayoshi, Japanese shōgun (died 1709)
- 1680 – Jean-Baptiste Le Moyne, Sieur de Bienville, Canadian politician, 2nd Colonial Governor of Louisiana (died 1767)
- 1685 – George Frideric Handel, German-English organist and composer (died 1759)
- 1723 – Richard Price, Welsh-English minister and philosopher (died 1791)
- 1744 – Mayer Amschel Rothschild, German banker and businessman (died 1812)
- 1792 – José Joaquín de Herrera, Mexican politician and general (died 1854)
- 1805 – Johan Jakob Nervander, Finnish poet, physicist and meteorologist (died 1848)
- 1830 – Magdalene Osenbroch, Norwegian actress (died 1854)
- 1831 – Hendrik Willem Mesdag, Dutch painter (died 1915)
- 1833 – Alfons Grotowski, Polish sanitary engineer (died 1922)
- 1842 – Karl Robert Eduard von Hartmann, German philosopher and author (died 1906)
- 1850 – César Ritz, Swiss businessman, founded The Ritz Hotel, London and Hôtel Ritz Paris (died 1918)
- 1868 – W. E. B. Du Bois, American sociologist, historian, and activist (died 1963)
- 1868 – Anna Hofman-Uddgren, Swedish actress, singer, and director (died 1947)
- 1873 – Liang Qichao, Chinese journalist, philosopher, and scholar (died 1929)
- 1874 – Konstantin Päts, Estonian lawyer and politician, 1st President of Estonia (died 1956)
- 1878 – Kazimir Malevich, Ukrainian painter and theorist (died 1935)
- 1883 – Karl Jaspers, German-Swiss psychiatrist and philosopher (died 1969)
- 1883 – Guy C. Wiggins, American painter (died 1962)
- 1884 – Casimir Funk, Polish biochemist (died 1967)
- 1889 – Musidora, French actress and director (died 1957)
- 1889 – Cyril Delevanti, English-American actor (died 1975)
- 1889 – Victor Fleming, American director, cinematographer, and producer (died 1949)
- 1889 – John Gilbert Winant, American captain, pilot, and politician, 60th Governor of New Hampshire (died 1947)
- 1892 – Kathleen Harrison, English actress (died 1995)
- 1892 – Agnes Smedley, American journalist and writer (died 1950)
- 1894 – Harold Horder, Australian rugby league player and coach (died 1978)
- 1899 – Erich Kästner, German author and poet (died 1974)
- 1899 – Norman Taurog, American director and screenwriter (died 1981)

=== 1901–present ===
- 1904 – Terence Fisher, English director and screenwriter (died 1980)
- 1908 – William McMahon, Australian lawyer and politician, 20th Prime Minister of Australia (died 1988)
- 1915 – Jon Hall, American actor and director (died 1979)
- 1919 – Johnny Carey, Irish footballer and manager (died 1995)
- 1920 – Paul Gérin-Lajoie, Canadian lawyer and politician (died 2018)
- 1922 – Johnny Franz, English record producer (died 1977)
- 1923 – Rafael Addiego Bruno, Uruguayan jurist and politician, President of Uruguay (died 2014)
- 1923 – Harry Clarke, English footballer (died 2000)
- 1923 – Ioannis Grivas, Greek judge and politician, 176th Prime Minister of Greece (died 2016)
- 1923 – Dante Lavelli, American football player (died 2009)
- 1923 – Clarence D. Lester, American fighter pilot (died 1986)
- 1923 – Mary Francis Shura, American author (died 1991)
- 1924 – Allan McLeod Cormack, South-African-American physicist and academic, Nobel Prize laureate (died 1998)
- 1925 – Louis Stokes, American lawyer and politician (died 2015)
- 1927 – Régine Crespin, French soprano and actress (died 2007)
- 1927 – Jessica Huntley, Guyanese activist and publisher (died 2013)
- 1927 – Mirtha Legrand, Argentine actress and television presenter
- 1928 – Hans Herrmann, German racing driver (died 2026)
- 1928 – Vasily Lazarev, Russian colonel, physician, and astronaut (died 1990)
- 1929 – Patriarch Alexy II of Moscow (died 2008)
- 1929 – Elston Howard, American baseball player and coach (died 1980)
- 1930 – Paul West, English-American author, poet, and academic (died 2015)
- 1931 – Tom Wesselmann, American painter and sculptor (died 2004)
- 1932 – Majel Barrett, American actress and producer (died 2008)
- 1938 – Sylvia Chase, American broadcast journalist (died 2019)
- 1938 – Paul Morrissey, American director, producer, and screenwriter (died 2024)
- 1938 – Diane Varsi, American actress (died 1992)
- 1939 – Lee Shaffer, American basketball player
- 1940 – Jackie Smith, American football player
- 1941 – Ron Hunt, American baseball player
- 1943 – Bobby Mitchell, American golfer (died 2018)
- 1944 – Bernard Cornwell, English author and educator
- 1944 – Florian Fricke, German keyboard player and composer (died 2001)
- 1944 – Johnny Winter, American singer-songwriter, guitarist, and producer (died 2014)
- 1945 – Allan Boesak, South African cleric and politician
- 1946 – Rusty Young, American singer-songwriter and guitarist (died 2021)
- 1947 – Pia Kjærsgaard, Danish politician, Speaker of the Danish Parliament
- 1947 – Anton Mosimann, Swiss chef and author
- 1948 – Bill Alexander, English director and producer
- 1948 – Trevor Cherry, English footballer (died 2020)
- 1948 – Steve Priest, English singer-songwriter and bass player (died 2020)
- 1949 – César Aira, Argentine author and translator
- 1949 – Marc Garneau, Canadian engineer, astronaut, and politician (died 2025)
- 1950 – Rebecca Goldstein, American philosopher and author
- 1950 – John Greaves, Welsh bass guitarist and composer
- 1951 – Eddie Dibbs, American tennis player
- 1951 – Debbie Friedman, American singer-songwriter of Jewish melodies (died 2011)
- 1953 – Kenny Bee, Hong Kong singer-songwriter, guitarist, and actor
- 1953 – Satoru Nakajima, Japanese racing driver
- 1954 – Rajini Thiranagama, Sri Lankan physician and academic (died 1989)
- 1955 – Flip Saunders, American basketball player and coach (died 2015)
- 1955 – Francesca Simon, American-British author
- 1956 – Sandra Osborne, Scottish politician
- 1957 – Charlie Brandt, American serial killer (died 2004)
- 1958 – David Sylvian, English singer-songwriter
- 1959 – Clayton Anderson, American engineer and astronaut
- 1959 – Nick de Bois, English politician
- 1959 – Ian Liddell-Grainger, Scottish soldier and politician
- 1959 – Linda Nolan, Irish singer and actress (died 2025)
- 1963 – Bobby Bonilla, American baseball player
- 1963 – Radosław Sikorski, Polish journalist and politician, 11th Minister of Foreign Affairs of Poland
- 1964 – John Norum, Norwegian guitarist and songwriter
- 1965 – Michael Dell, American businessman
- 1965 – Helena Suková, Czech-Monacan tennis player
- 1967 – Steve Stricker, American golfer
- 1967 – Chris Vrenna, American drummer, songwriter, and producer
- 1969 – Michael Campbell, New Zealand golfer
- 1969 – Martine Croxall, English journalist and television news presenter
- 1969 – Bhagyashree, Indian actress
- 1971 – Carin Koch, Swedish golfer
- 1971 – Melinda Messenger, English model and television host
- 1971 – Joe-Max Moore, American soccer player
- 1972 – Alessandro Sturba, Italian footballer
- 1972 – Rondell White, American baseball player
- 1973 – Jeff Nordgaard, American-Polish basketball player
- 1974 – Herschelle Gibbs, South African cricketer
- 1974 – Robbi Kempson, South African rugby player
- 1975 – Michael Cornacchia, American actor, director, producer, and screenwriter
- 1976 – Kelly Macdonald, Scottish actress
- 1976 – Jeff O'Neill, Canadian ice hockey player
- 1977 – Kristina Šmigun-Vähi, Estonian skier
- 1978 – Dan Snyder, Canadian ice hockey player (died 2003)
- 1981 – Gareth Barry, English footballer
- 1981 – Charles Tillman, American football player
- 1982 – Jia Perkins, American basketball player and coach
- 1982 – Karan Singh Grover, Indian actor
- 1983 – Mido, Egyptian footballer, manager and sportscaster
- 1983 – Dijon Thompson, American basketball player
- 1986 – Emerson Conceição, Brazilian footballer
- 1986 – Skylar Grey, American singer-songwriter
- 1986 – Kazuya Kamenashi, Japanese singer-songwriter and actor
- 1986 – Jerod Mayo, American football player and coach
- 1986 – Ola Svensson, Swedish singer-songwriter
- 1987 – Ab-Soul, American rapper
- 1987 – Malik Hairston, American basketball player
- 1987 – Theophilus London, Trinidadian-American singer-songwriter and producer
- 1988 – Nicolás Gaitán, Argentine footballer
- 1989 – Evan Bates, American ice dancer
- 1989 – Jérémy Pied, French footballer
- 1989 – Wilin Rosario, Dominican baseball player
- 1990 – Kevin Connauton, Canadian ice hockey player
- 1990 – Marco Scandella, Canadian ice hockey player
- 1992 – Casemiro, Brazilian footballer
- 1992 – Kyriakos Papadopoulos, Greek footballer
- 1994 – Triptii Dimri, Indian actress
- 1994 – Neviana Vladinova, Bulgarian rhythmic gymnast
- 1995 – Andrew Wiggins, Canadian basketball player
- 1996 – D'Angelo Russell, American basketball player
- 1996 – Nick Schmaltz, American ice hockey player
- 1997 – Jamal Murray, Canadian basketball player
- 2000 – Femke Broeders-Bol, Dutch hurdler and sprinter
- 2002 – Alice Litman, English transgender woman

== Deaths ==
=== Pre-1600 ===
- 715 – Al-Walid I, Umayyad caliph (born 668)
- 908 – Li Keyong, Shatuo military governor during the Tang dynasty in China (born 856)
- 943 – Herbert II, Count of Vermandois, (born 884)
- 943 – David I, prince of Tao-Klarjeti (Georgia)
- 1011 – Willigis, German archbishop (born 940)
- 1100 – Emperor Zhezong of Song (born 1076)
- 1270 – Isabel of France (born 1225)
- 1447 – Humphrey, Duke of Gloucester (born 1390)
- 1447 – Pope Eugene IV (born 1383)
- 1464 – Emperor Yingzong of Ming (born 1427)
- 1473 – Arnold, Duke of Gelderland (born 1410)
- 1526 – Diego Colón, Spanish Viceroy of the Indies (born c. 1479)
- 1554 – Henry Grey, Duke of Suffolk, English politician, Lord Lieutenant of Leicestershire (born 1515)

=== 1601–1900 ===
- 1603 – Andrea Cesalpino, Italian philosopher, physician, and botanist (born 1519)
- 1603 – Franciscus Vieta, French mathematician (born 1540)
- 1620 – Nicholas Fuller, English politician (born 1543)
- 1704 – Georg Muffat, French organist and composer (born 1653)
- 1766 – Stanisław Leszczyński, Polish king (born 1677)
- 1781 – George Taylor, Founding Father of the United States (born 1716)
- 1792 – Joshua Reynolds, English painter and academic (born 1723)
- 1821 – John Keats, English poet (born 1795)
- 1844 – Martim Francisco Ribeiro de Andrada, Brazilian politician, twice Minister of Finance, brother of José Bonifácio and Antônio Carlos (born 1775)
- 1848 – John Quincy Adams, American politician, 6th President of the United States (born 1767)
- 1855 – Carl Friedrich Gauss, German mathematician, astronomer, and physicist (born 1777)
- 1859 – Zygmunt Krasiński, Polish poet and playwright (born 1812)
- 1871 – Amanda Cajander, Finnish medical reformer (born 1827)
- 1879 – Albrecht von Roon, Prussian soldier and politician, 10th Minister President of Prussia (born 1803)
- 1897 – Woldemar Bargiel, German composer and educator (born 1828)
- 1900 – Ernest Dowson, English poet, novelist, and short story writer (born 1867)

=== 1901–present ===
- 1908 – Friedrich von Esmarch, German surgeon and academic (born 1823)
- 1918 – Adolphus Frederick VI, Grand Duke of Mecklenburg-Strelitz (born 1882)
- 1930 – Horst Wessel, German SA officer (born 1907)
- 1931 – Nellie Melba, Australian soprano and actress (born 1861)
- 1932 – Hadley Williams, Canadian surgeon and educator (born 1864)
- 1934 – Edward Elgar, English composer and academic (born 1857)
- 1944 – Leo Baekeland, Belgian-American chemist and engineer (born 1863)
- 1946 – Tomoyuki Yamashita, Japanese general (born 1885)
- 1948 – John Robert Gregg, Irish-American publisher and educator (born 1866)
- 1955 – Paul Claudel, French poet and playwright (born 1868)
- 1965 – Stan Laurel, English actor and comedian (born 1890)
- 1969 – Madhubala, Indian actress and producer (born 1933)
- 1969 – Saud bin Abdulaziz Al Saud, 2nd King of Saudi Arabia (born 1902)
- 1973 – Dickinson W. Richards, American physician and physiologist, Nobel Prize laureate (born 1895)
- 1974 – Harry Ruby, American composer and screenwriter (born 1895)
- 1976 – L. S. Lowry, English painter (born 1887)
- 1979 – W. A. C. Bennett, Canadian businessman and politician, 25th Premier of British Columbia (born 1900)
- 1983 – Herbert Howells, English organist and composer (born 1892)
- 1990 – José Napoleón Duarte, Salvadoran engineer and politician, President of El Salvador (born 1925)
- 1995 – James Herriot, English veterinarian and author (born 1916)
- 1997 – Tony Williams, American drummer, composer, and producer (born 1945)
- 1998 – Philip Abbott, American actor and director (born 1924)
- 1999 – The Renegade, American wrestler (born 1965)
- 2000 – Ofra Haza, Israeli singer-songwriter and actress (born 1957)
- 2000 – Stanley Matthews, English footballer and manager (born 1915)
- 2003 – Howie Epstein, American bass player, songwriter, and producer (born 1955)
- 2003 – Robert K. Merton, American sociologist and academic (born 1910)
- 2004 – Vijay Anand, Indian director, producer, screenwriter, and actor (born 1934)
- 2004 – Sikander Bakht, Indian politician, Indian Minister of External Affairs (born 1918)
- 2006 – Muhammad Shamsul Huq, Bangladeshi academic and former Minister of Foreign Affairs (born 1912)
- 2006 – Telmo Zarra, Spanish footballer (born 1921)
- 2007 – Hanna Barysevich, the oldest female resident of Belarus not registered by the Guinness Book of World Records (born 1888)
- 2007 – John Ritchie, English footballer (born 1941)
- 2008 – Janez Drnovšek, Slovenian economist and politician, 2nd President of Slovenia (born 1950)
- 2008 – Paul Frère, Belgian racing driver and journalist (born 1917)
- 2010 – Orlando Zapata, Cuban plumber and activist (born 1967)
- 2011 – Nirmala Srivastava, Indian religious leader, founded Sahaja Yoga (born 1923)
- 2012 – William Raggio, American lawyer and politician (born 1926)
- 2012 – David Sayre, American physicist and mathematician (born 1924)
- 2012 – Kazimierz Żygulski, Polish sociologist and activist (born 1919)
- 2013 – Eugene Bookhammer, American soldier and politician, 18th Lieutenant Governor of Delaware (born 1918)
- 2013 – Joseph Friedenson, Holocaust survivor, Holocaust historian, Yiddish writer, lecturer and editor (born 1922)
- 2013 – Julien Ries, Belgian cardinal (born 1920)
- 2013 – Lotika Sarkar, Indian lawyer and academic (born 1945)
- 2014 – Alice Herz-Sommer, Czech-English Holocaust survivor, pianist and educator (born 1903)
- 2014 – Roger Hilsman, American soldier, academic, and politician (born 1919)
- 2015 – James Aldridge, Australian-English journalist and author (born 1918)
- 2015 – Rana Bhagwandas, Pakistani lawyer and judge, Chief Justice of Pakistan (born 1942)
- 2016 – Peter Lustig, German television host and author (born 1937)
- 2016 – Jacqueline Mattson, American baseball player (born 1928)
- 2019 – Katherine Helmond, American actress (born 1929)
- 2021 – Ahmed Zaki Yamani, Saudi Arabian politician (born 1930)
- 2023 – Tony Earl, American politician, 40th Governor of Wisconsin (born 1936)
- 2023 – John Motson, English football commentator (born 1945)
- 2024 – Flaco, Eurasian eagle-owl (born 2010)
- 2025 – Larry Dolan, American attorney (born 1931)
- 2025 – Chris Jasper, American singer, composer and producer (born 1951)
- 2025 – Al Trautwig, American sports commentator (born 1956)

== Holidays and observances ==
- Christian feast day:
  - Polycarp of Smyrna
  - Blessed Rafaela Ybarra de Vilallonga
  - Serenus the Gardener
  - Willigis
  - February 23 (Eastern Orthodox liturgics)
- The Emperor's Birthday, birthday of Naruhito, the current Emperor of Japan (Japan)
- Mashramani-Republic Day (Guyana)
- National Day (Brunei)
- Red Army Day or Day of Soviet Army and Navy in the former Soviet Union, also held in various former Soviet republics:
  - Defender of the Fatherland Day (Russia)
  - Defender of the Fatherland and Armed Forces day (Belarus)
  - Armed Forces Day (Tajikistan) (Tajikistan)
