= First aid =

Emergency first response medical treatment

The universal first aid symbol

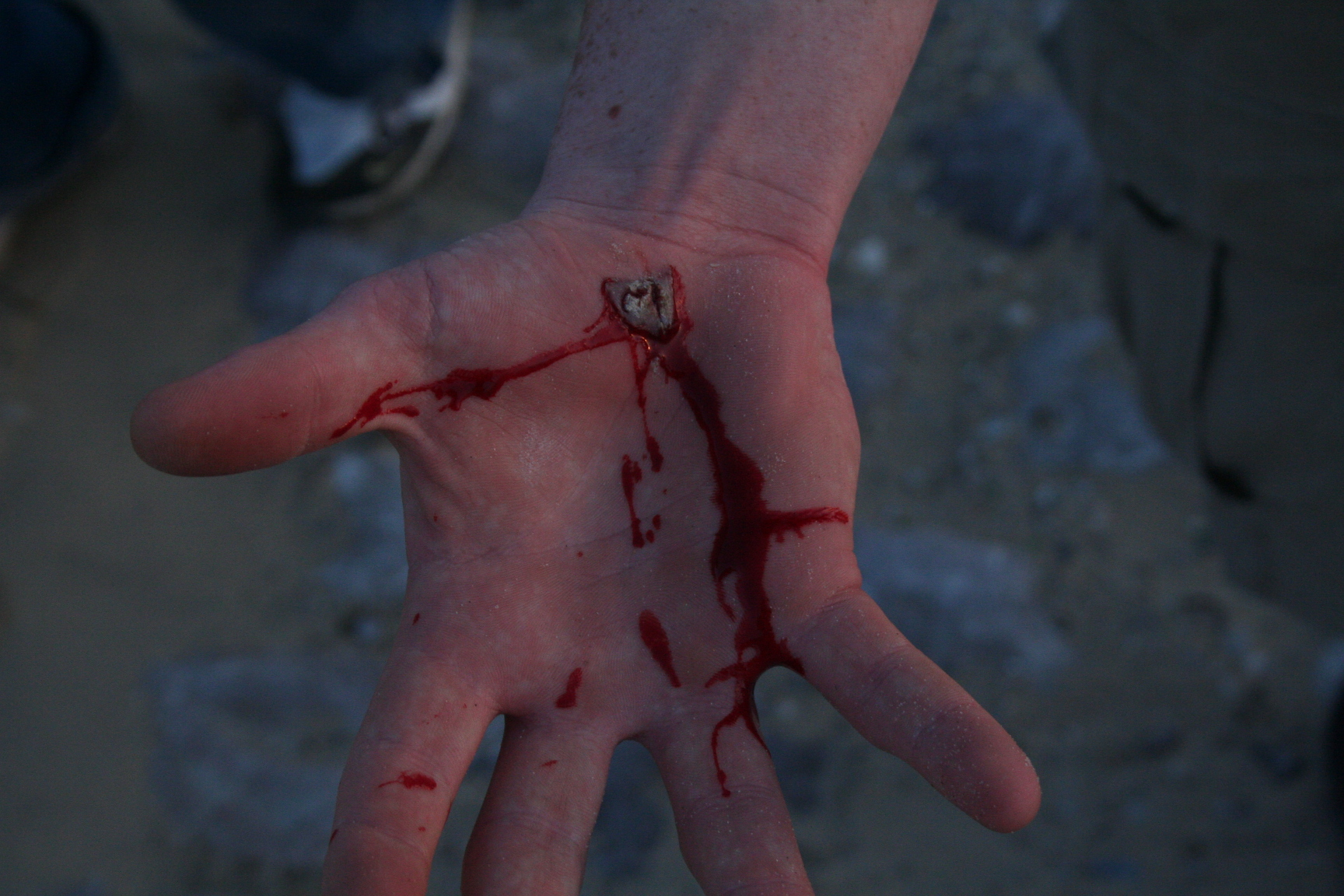
Skateboard fall resulting in a hand wound

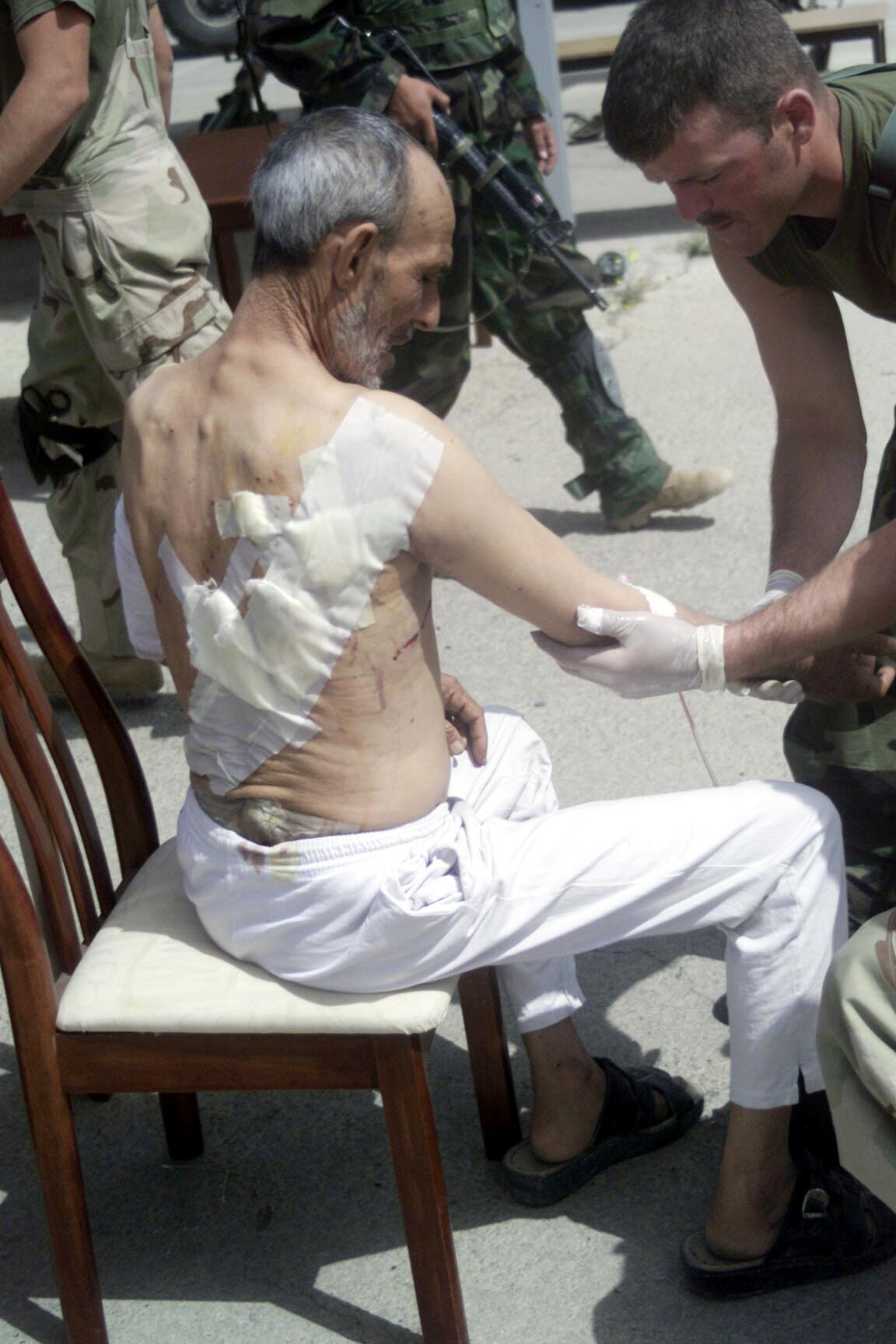
A US Navy corpsman gives first aid to an injured Iraqi citizen.

First aid is the first and immediate assistance given to any person with a medical emergency, with care provided to preserve life, prevent the condition from worsening, or to promote recovery until medical services arrive. First aid is generally performed by someone with basic medical or first response training. Mental health first aid is an extension of the concept of first aid to cover mental health, while psychological first aid is used as early treatment of people who are at risk for developing PTSD. Conflict first aid, focused on preservation and recovery of an individual's social or relationship well-being, is being piloted in Canada.

There are many situations that may require first aid, and many countries have legislation, regulation, or guidance, which specifies a minimum level of first aid provision in certain circumstances. This can include specific training or equipment to be available in the workplace (such as an automated external defibrillator), the provision of specialist first aid cover at public gatherings, or mandatory first aid training within schools. Generally, five steps are associated with first aid:

1. Assess the surrounding areas.
2. Move to a safe surrounding (if not already; for example, road accidents are unsafe to be dealt with on roads).
3. Call for help: both professional medical help and people nearby who might help in first aid such as the compressions of cardiopulmonary resuscitation (CPR).
4. Perform suitable first aid depending on the injury suffered by the casualty.
5. Evaluate the casualty for any fatal signs of danger, or possibility of performing the first aid again.

== Early history and warfare ==
Skills of what is now known as first aid have been recorded throughout history, especially in relation to warfare, where the care of both traumatic and medical cases is required in particularly large numbers. The bandaging of battle wounds is shown on Classical Greek pottery from c. 500 BC, whilst the parable of the Good Samaritan includes references to binding or dressing wounds. There are numerous references to first aid performed within the Roman army, with a system of first aid supported by surgeons, field ambulances, and hospitals. Roman legions had the specific role of capsarii, who were responsible for first aid such as bandaging, and are the forerunners of the modern combat medic.

Further examples occur through history, still mostly related to battle, with examples such as the Knights Hospitaller in the 11th century AD, providing care to pilgrims and knights in the Holy Land.

=== Formalization of life saving treatments ===
During the late 18th century, drowning as a cause of death was a major concern amongst the population. In 1767, a society for the preservation of life from accidents in water was started in Amsterdam, and in 1773, physician William Hawes began publicizing the power of artificial respiration as means of resuscitation of those who appeared drowned. This led to the formation, in 1774, of the Society for the Recovery of Persons Apparently Drowned, later the Royal Humane Society, who did much to promote resuscitation.

Napoleon's surgeon, Baron Dominique-Jean Larrey, is credited with creating an ambulance corps, the ambulance volantes, which included medical assistants, tasked to administer first aid in battle.

In 1859, Swiss businessman Jean-Henri Dunant witnessed the aftermath of the Battle of Solferino, and his work led to the formation of the Red Cross, with a key stated aim of "aid to sick and wounded soldiers in the field". The Red Cross and Red Crescent are still the largest provider of first aid worldwide.

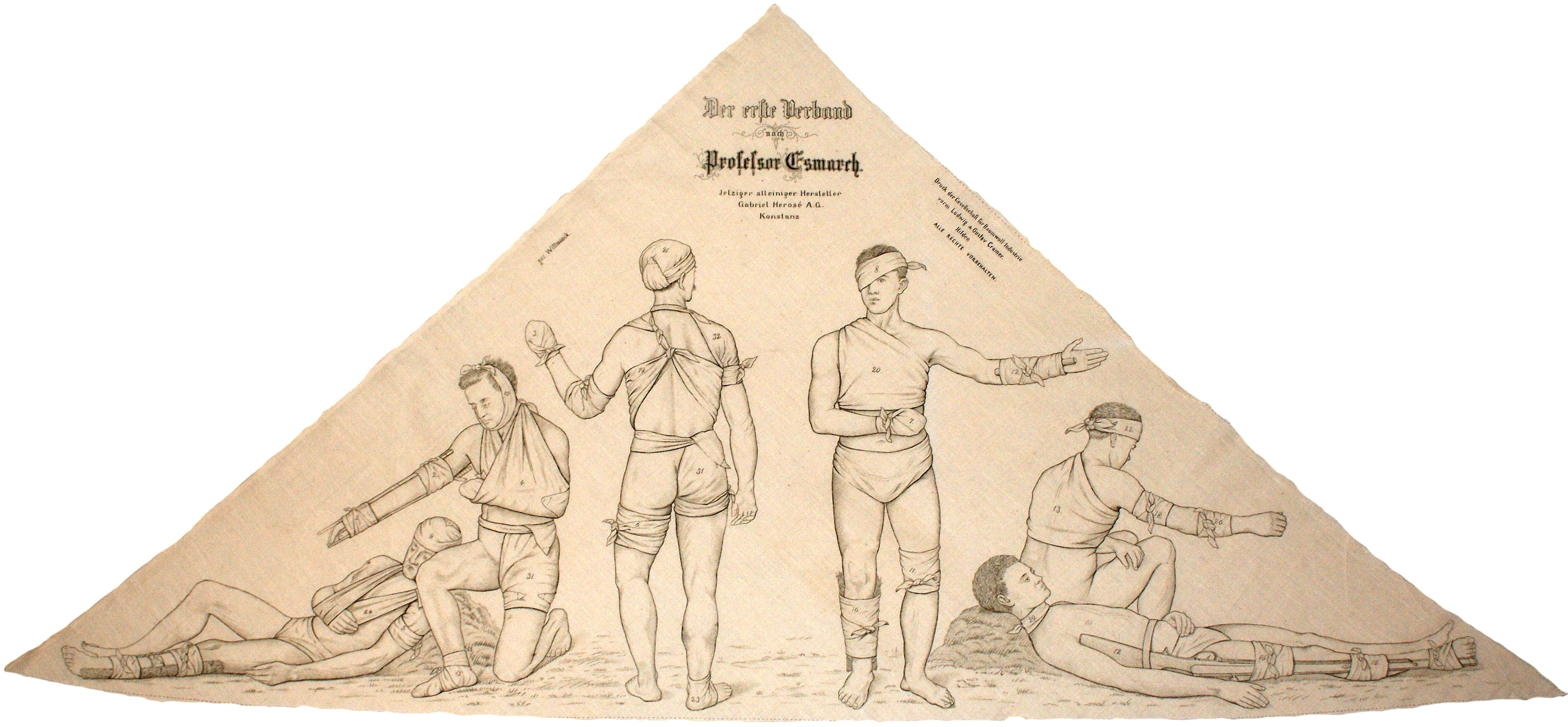
Esmarch bandage showing soldiers how to perform first aid

In 1870, Prussian military surgeon Friedrich von Esmarch introduced formalized first aid to the military, and first coined the term "erste hilfe" (translating to 'first aid'), including training for soldiers in the Franco-Prussian War on care for wounded comrades using pre-learnt bandaging and splinting skills, and making use of the Esmarch bandage which he designed. The bandage was issued as standard to the Prussian combatants, and also included aide-memoire pictures showing common uses.

In 1872, the Order of Saint John of Jerusalem in England changed its focus from hospice care, and set out to start a system of practical medical help, starting with making a grant towards the establishment of the UK's first ambulance service. This was followed by creating its own wheeled transport litter in 1875 (the St John Ambulance), and in 1877 established the St John Ambulance Association (the forerunner of modern-day St John Ambulance) "to train men and women for the benefit of the sick and wounded".

Also in the UK, Surgeon-Major Peter Shepherd had seen the advantages of von Esmarch's new teaching of first aid, and introduced an equivalent programme for the British Army, and so being the first user of "first aid for the injured" in English, disseminating information through a series of lectures. Following this, in 1878, Shepherd and Colonel Francis Duncan took advantage of the newly charitable focus of St John, and established the concept of teaching first aid skills to civilians. The first classes were conducted in the hall of the Presbyterian school in Woolwich (near Woolwich barracks where Shepherd was based) using a comprehensive first aid curriculum.

First aid training began to spread through the British Empire through organisations such as St John, often starting, as in the UK, with high risk activities such as ports and railways.

The first recorded first aid training in the United States took place in Jermyn, Pennsylvania in 1899.

== Common emergences that require first aid in humans ==
List of common situations that require first aid, and information about them (in alphabetical order):

=== Bleeding ===
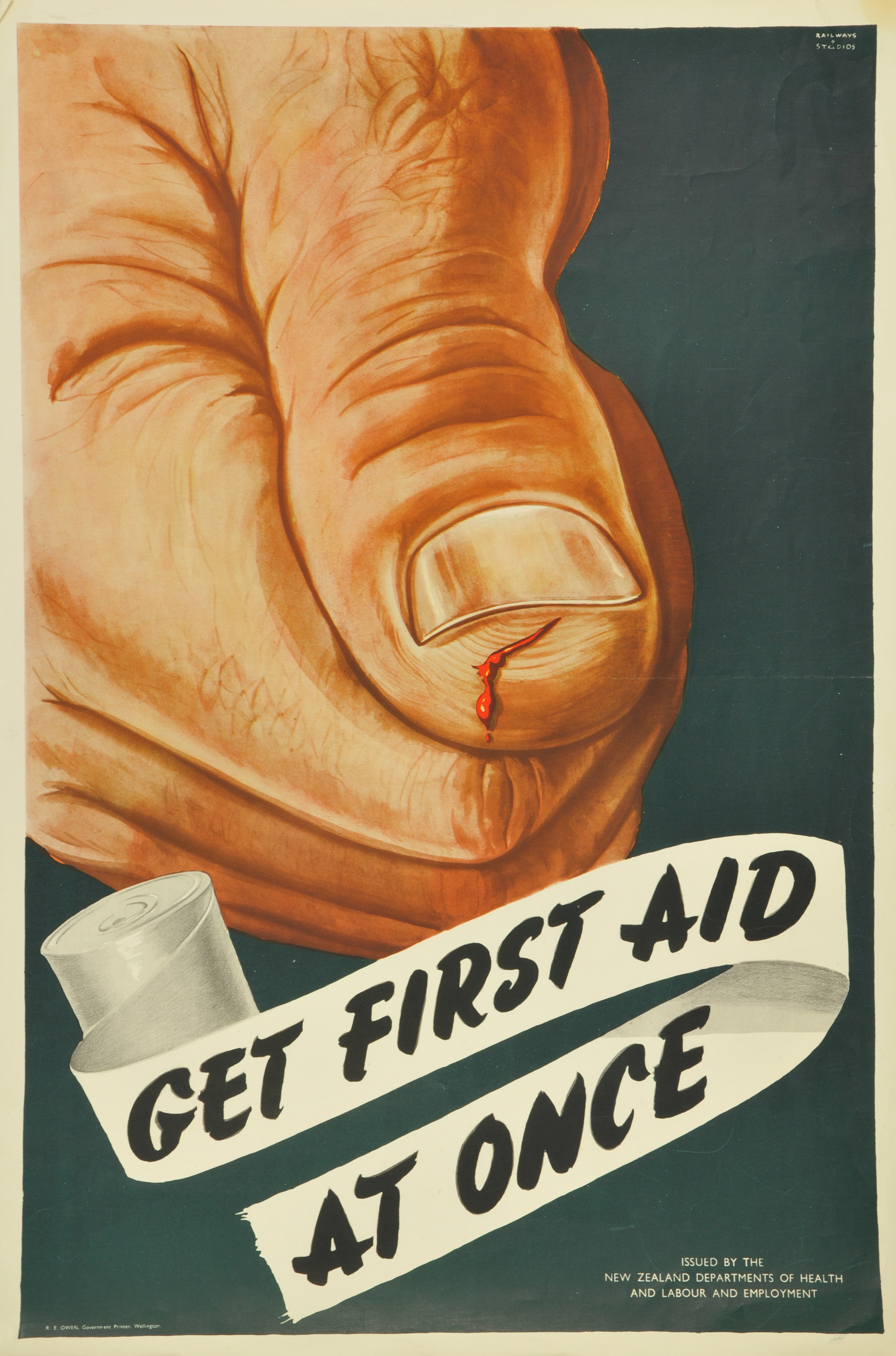
"Get first aid at once" prevention poster (New Zealand, 1950s).

Bleeding or hemorrhage is the escape of blood from veins or arteries.

=== Cardiac arrest (total stop of heartbeat) ===
Cardiac arrest is the complete stop of heart function.

=== Choking ===
Choking is the obstruction of breathing caused by a blockage in the respiratory tract.

=== Diabetes, hyperglycemia ===
Hyperglycemia or hyperglycaemia is a condition in which an excessive level of glucose is present in the blood.

=== Diabetes, hypoglycemia ===
Hypoglycemia or hypoglycaemia is a condition in which an excessively low level of glucose is present in the blood.

It typically occurs due to complications with medication used to reduce blood sugar levels in diabetic patients.

=== Drowning ===
Drowning in humans is a type of suffocation caused by both the nose and mouth being submerged in liquid.

The first aid for drowning is very similar to that of cardiorespiratory arrest

Heart Attack

A myocardial infarction, commonly known as a heart attack, is the sudden reduction in or lack of blood flow in one of the coronary arteries in the heart, causing infarction (tissue death due to inadequate blood supply). Risk factors for myocardial infarctions include living a sedentary lifestyle, age (being over 45 for men and 55 for women), tobacco and alcohol use, stress, obesity, high cholesterol, family history, and diabetes.

=== Stroke ===
A stroke is a sudden lack of blood supply to the brain caused by a burst or blocked artery.

== Aims of first aid ==
The primary goal of first aid is to prevent serious injury from worsening or resulting in death. The key aims of first aid can be summarized with the acronym of 'the three Ps':

- Preserve life: The overriding aim of all medical care which includes first aid, is to save lives and minimize the threat of death. First aid done correctly should help reduce the patient's level of pain and calm them down during the evaluation and treatment process.
- Prevent further harm: Prevention of further harm includes addressing both external factors, such as moving a patient away from any cause of harm, and applying first aid techniques to prevent worsening of the condition, such as applying pressure to stop a bleed from becoming dangerous.
- Promote recovery: First aid also involves trying to start the recovery process from the illness or injury, and in some cases might involve completing a treatment, such as in the case of applying a plaster to a small wound.

First aid is not medical treatment, and cannot be compared with what a trained medical professional provides. First aid involves making common sense decisions in the best interest of an injured person.

== Setting the priorities ==
A first aid intervention would follow an order, which would try to attend in the best manner the main threats for the life and mobility of the victim.

There are some first aid protocols (such as ATLS, BATLS and SAFE-POINT) that define which are the priorities and the correct execution of the steps for saving human life. A major benefit of the use of official protocols is that they require minimum resources, time and skills, and have a great degree of success.

=== ABCDE and csABCDE general protocol ===
The ABCDE method is the general protocol of first aid and implies a quite general view.

It was initially developed by Dr Peter Safar in the 1950s. But it has received some modifications, improvements and variations that were intended for more specific contexts. For example: it has been completed with improvements from the ATLS (Advanced Trauma Life Support) version of the American College of Surgeons and the BATLS (Battlefield Advanced Trauma Life Support) version of the British Army.

As a result, the mnemonic of the steps of this protocol is ABCDE, or its improved version (cs)ABCDE (sometimes called xABCDE, the words in the mnemonic may vary), which represent:
—An attached first part (named as "cs" or "x", or in any other way) that will always mention stopping the critical losses of blood and managing with a special and careful treatment to patients with serious damages at the spine that threaten their future mobility:

- catastrophic-bleeding (stopping urgently the massive external bleedings, as it is marked in the BATLS version).
- spine-protection (previous examination of the spine, and careful preventive treatment for its damages, as it is marked in the ATLS version).

—The ABCDE protocol itself:

- Airway (clearing airways).
- Breathing (ensuring respiration).
- Circulation (ensuring effective cardiac output).
  Any Defibrillation process for a cardiac arrest (total stop of heartbeat) would be included here, or in 'Disability' (as a double mnemonic 'D').
- Disability (neurological condition, level of glucose can also be examined).
- Exposure (or 'Evaluate': other questions in an overall examination of the patient, environment).

=== ABC and CABD cardiopulmonary resuscitation protocol ===
This protocol (originally named as ABC) is a simplified version or concrete application of the previous csABCDE (or ABCDE) protocol, that focuses in the use of cardio-pulmonary resuscitation. The American Heart Association and the International Liaison Committee on Resuscitation teach it as a reference.

Its current mnemonic is CABD (an improvement in the sequence for most of the cases):

- Circulation or Chest Compressions.
- Airway: attempt to open the airway (using a head-tilt and chin-lift technique; not in the case of babies, which require avoid tilting the head).
- Breathing or Rescue Breaths.
- Defibrillation: use of an automated external defibrillator to recover heart function.

=== Wider protocols ===
These are the protocols that do not only deal with direct care to the victim but they also mention other complementary tasks (before and later).

==== European protocol ====
This method has been studied and employed for a long time in many European countries, as France. It is a reference, of a certain reputation, that could be applied solely or to a certain degree, usually combining it with the common csABCDE (ABCDE) method or its simplified CABD (ABC) variant about cardio-pulmonary resuscitation. The European method has a wider range than them, and their steps include tasks that are previous to the first aid techniques themselves.

These are its steps (with no official mnemonic that helps to remember them):

- Protection for patients and rescuers. If dangers are present, the patient would be moved to a safer place with a careful management of any detected spinal injury.
- Evaluation of the patient (looking for priorities as critical bleeding and cardiac arrest).
- Alerting to medical services and bystanders.
- Performing the first aid practices. The CABD (or ABC) method for cardio-pulmonary resuscitation and many details of the wider csABCDE (or ABCDE) method would be included in this step.

=== Other mentionable protocols ===
Some other known protocols that could be mentioned in many contexts (in alphabetical order):

AMEGA protocol

It is similar to the European protocol, because it also has a wider range than the common csABCDE (or ABCDE) protocol, and includes other tasks that are previous to the first aid techniques themselves. The order of the steps is changed, and the experience with it is lesser, but it adds the idea of a posterior 'aftermath' phase.

The mnemonic AMEGA refers to:

- Assess the situation, looking for risks.
- Make safe the situation, after having identified the risks.
- Emergency aid. Performing the first aid practices.
- Get help. Asking for emergency help to medical services and bystanders.
- Aftermath. The aftermath tasks include recording and reporting, continued care of patients and the welfare of responders and the replacement of used first aid kit elements.

ATLS and BATLS protocols

They are basically the common ABCDE and csABCDE protocol, but focusing in particular aspects.

The ATLS (Advanced Trauma Life Support) version was developed by the American College of Surgeons, focusing in the particular needs of trauma and specifically in the spinal injuries. And the BATLS (Battlefield Advanced Trauma Life Support) version is an improvement for the British Army that added the concept of 'catastrophic bleeding'.

The preference for one or another among all these protocols can depend on the context and the audience.

==== Check, Call and Care protocol ====
It comes from Red Cross and, as the European protocol, has a wider range than the common csABCDE (ABCDE) method. So it could be seen as a simplification of the European protocol, and, especially, easier to remember as a guide for most of cases.

It mentions the following steps:

- Check the scene for safety of the rescuer and others, and check the patient's condition.
- Call to emergency medical services.
- Care the patient.

==== SAFE-POINT protocol ====
Another European protocol, which appeared in the field of construction of Czech Republic to react to any emergence .

Their steps (which have not any mnemonic) are:

- Safety of the rescuers.
- Calling to emergency telephone number.
- Bleeding: treating the massive bleedings.
- Freeing the airways.
- Resuscitation: applying cardiopulmonary resuscitation.
- Keeping warm to the patient.

== Key basic skills ==
Certain skills are considered essential to the provision of first aid and are taught ubiquitously.

=== Displacement skills ===
If there are dangers around (such as fire, electric dangers or others) the patient has to be moved to a safe place, (if it is safe for the first aid provider to do so), where providing the required first aid procedures is possible.

—In case of a possible severe spinal injury: when a patient seems to have a possible serious injury in the spinal cord (in the backbone, either at the neck part or the back part), that patient must not be moved except if that is necessary, and, when necessary, it must be done as little as possible and very carefully (see mentions about this type of injury in the gallery of drawings below). These precautions avoid many risks of causing further damages for the patient's mobility in the future.

Usually, the patient needs to end up lying down, in a face-up position, on a sufficiently firm surface (for example, on the floor, which allows to perform the chest compressions of cardiopulmonary resuscitation).

Displacement of victims to a safe place
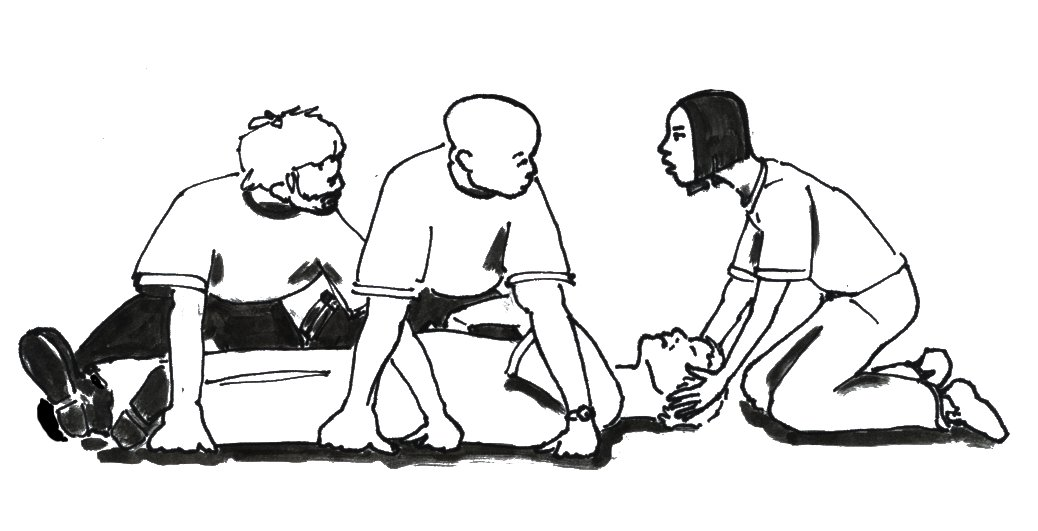
—A victim with a serious injury in the spine (in the back or the neck), which indicates a risk to the future mobility, can be carefully transferred by several rescuers that work coordinately.
The victim's head and back would be held in the same position they were.

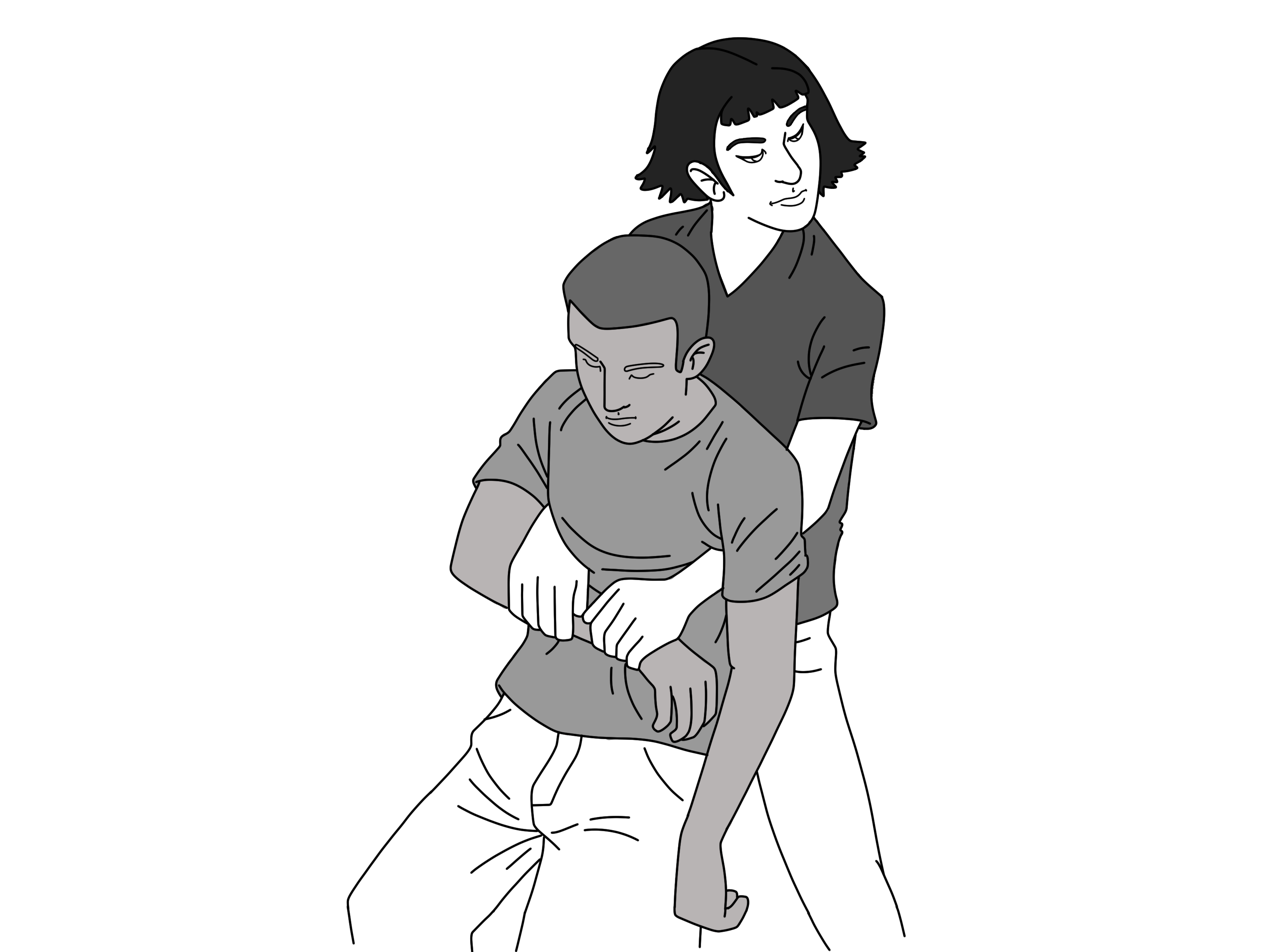
—When there is a victim with a serious injury in the spine (in the back or the neck) and a rescuer without instruments, the rescuer can try to carry the victim carefully through the Rautek maneuver (as in the picture), trying to keep victim's head and back in the same position they were.
The victim's head can be supported on the rescuer to try to soften the movements.
A second rescuer can hold the legs.

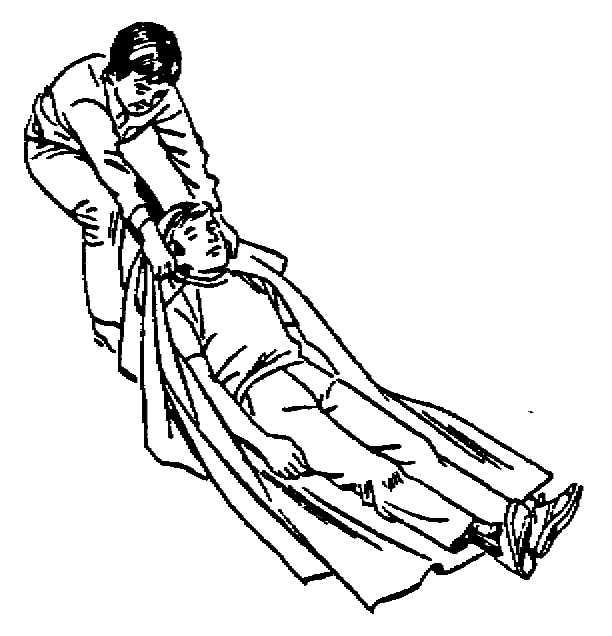
—A victim without a serious injury in the spine (in the back or the neck) can be pulled through the floor, which is easier on a blanket, carpet or another tissue located under most of the body.
—Carrying on a base to victims with a suspected spinal injury would require to place them carefully, while keeping their head and back in the same position they were, on a higher or much thicker base (as a litter or mattress), for a better displacement.

=== Checking skills ===
They evaluate the condition of the victim, first attending to the main threats for life.

The preferred initial way of checking consist of asking, commonly by touching the patient in one of his shoulders and shouting something, such as: "can you hear me?"

In some cases, the victim has a wound that bleeds abundantly, which requires its own additional treatment to stop the blood loss (usually, it would begin by keeping the wound pressed).

If the patient does not react, the heartbeats can be checked in the carotid pulse: placing two fingers on any side of the neck (on the left or the right side), near his head. In cases where checking the carotid pulse is impossible, heartbeats can be perceived in the radial pulse: placing two fingers on a wrist, under the part of the thumb, and applying moderate pressure. Breathing can also be checked additionally, placing an ear on the mouth and, at the same time, watching the chest rising by the effect of the air. It is recommended not to waste too much time of first aid in checking (professional rescuers are taught to take 10 seconds in it).

Check of patient's condition
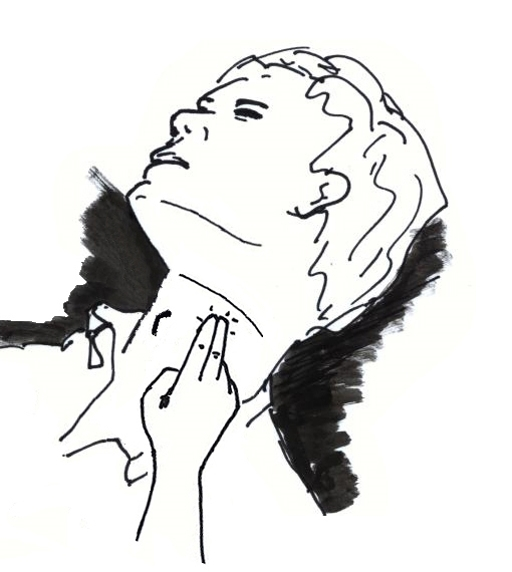
Checking of heartbeats in the carotid pulse.
This is usually the fastest method of checking the patient's condition.

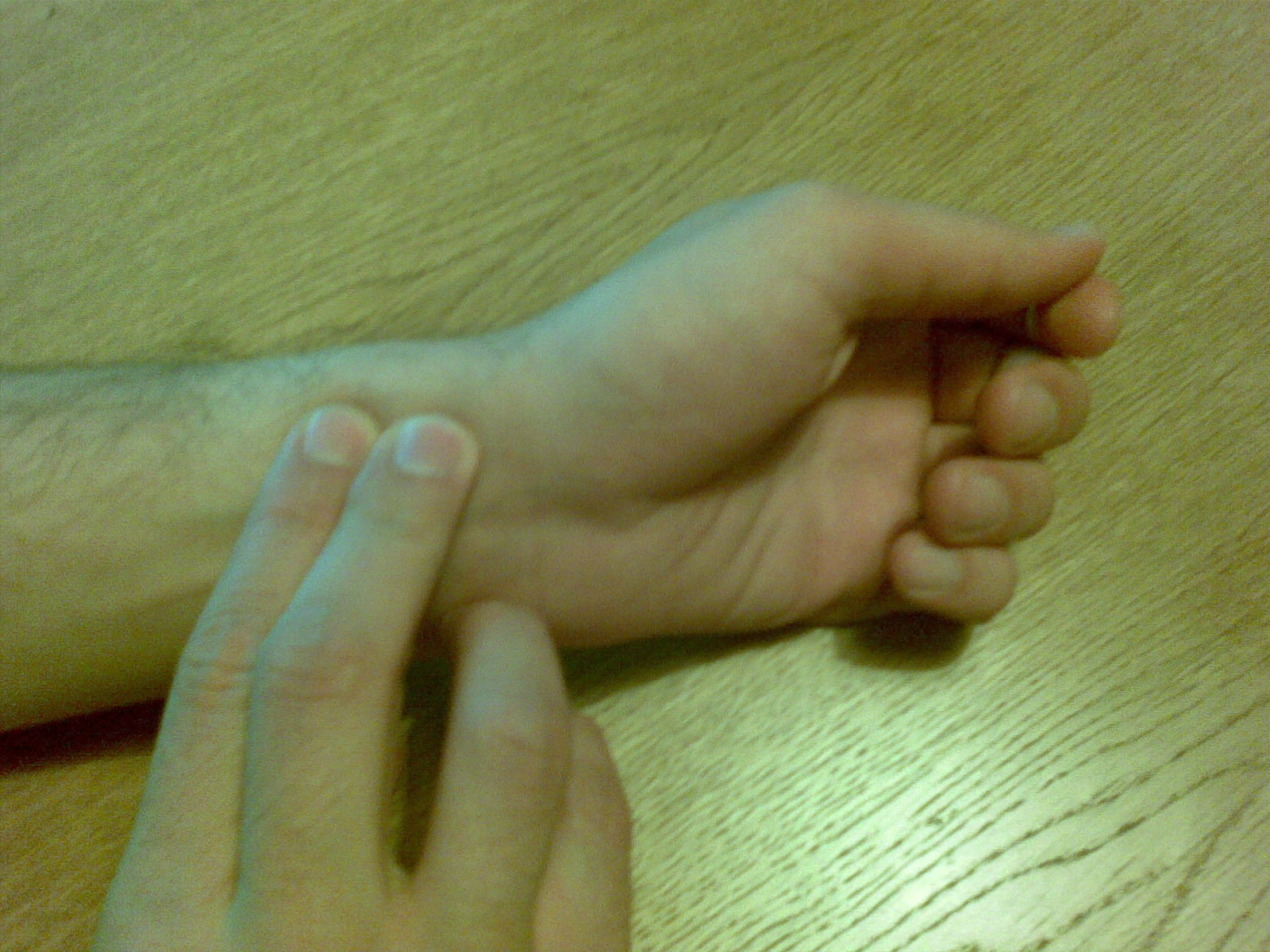
Verification of heartbeats in the radial pulse, pressing moderately on a wrist, under the part of the thumb.

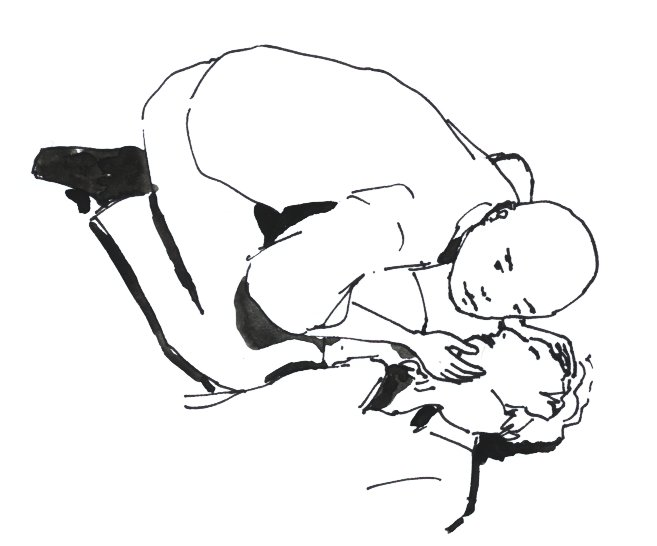
Check of patient's breathing, listening the air inside of the mouth and watching the chest swelling.

=== Cardiopulmonary resuscitation (CPR) ===
Cardiopulmonary resuscitation (CPR) is the method of first aid for treating victims of cardiac arrest (complete stop of heartbeat).

Cardiopulmonary resuscitation (CPR)

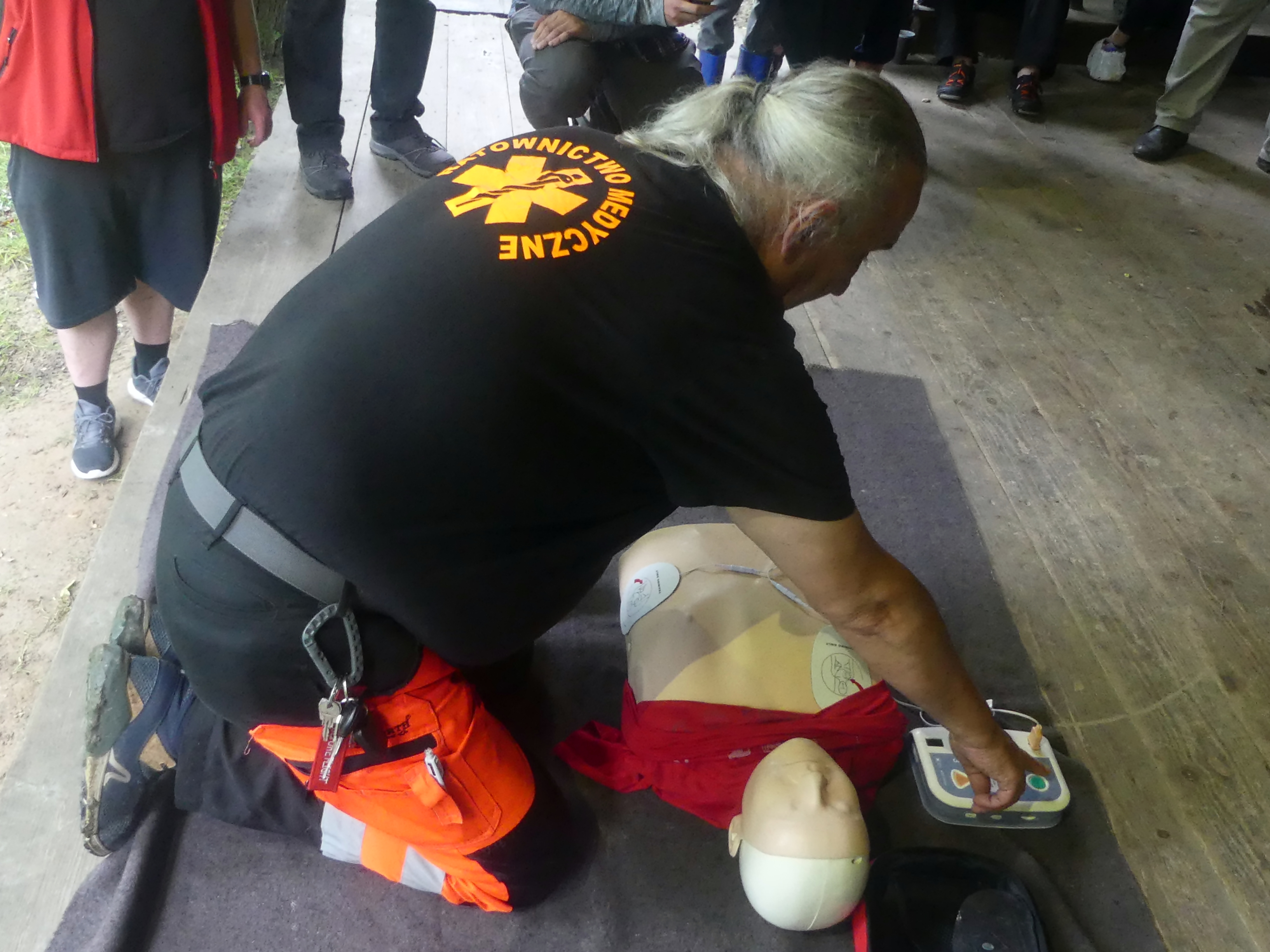
Traditional maneuvers of cardiopulmonary resuscitation (CPR) have included in the present the use of automatic defibrillators.

=== Airway, Breathing, and Circulation skills ===
In case of tongue fallen backwards, blocking the airway, it is necessary to hyperextend the head and pull up the chin, so that the tongue lifts and clears the airway.

ABC method stands for Airway, Breathing, and Circulation. The same mnemonic is used by emergency health professionals.

It is focused on critical life-saving intervention, and it must be rendered before treatment of less serious injuries.

Attention must first be brought to the airway to ensure it is clear. An obstruction (choking) is a life-threatening emergency. If an object blocks the airway, it requires anti-choking procedures. Following any evaluation of the airway, a first aid attendant would determine adequacy of breathing and provide rescue breathing if safe to do so.

Assessment of circulation is now not usually carried out for patients who are not breathing, with first aiders now trained to go straight to chest compressions (and thus providing artificial circulation) but pulse checks may be done on less serious patients.

Some organizations add a fourth step of "D" for Deadly bleeding or Defibrillation, while others consider this as part of the Circulation step simply referred as Disability. Variations on techniques to evaluate and maintain the ABCs depend on the skill level of the first aider. Once the ABCs are secured, first aiders can begin additional treatments or examination, as required if they possess the proper training (such as measuring pupil dilation).

Some organizations teach the same order of priority using the "3Bs": Breathing, Bleeding, and Bones (or "4Bs": Breathing, Bleeding, Burns, and Bones). While the ABCs and 3Bs are taught to be performed sequentially, certain conditions may require the consideration of two steps simultaneously. This includes the provision of both artificial respiration and chest compressions to someone who is not breathing and has no pulse, and the consideration of cervical spine injuries when ensuring an open airway.

==== Preserving life ====
The patient must have an open airway—that is, an unobstructed passage that allows air to travel from the open mouth or uncongested nose, down through the pharynx and into the lungs. Conscious people maintain their own airway automatically, but those who are unconscious (with a GCS of less than 8) may be unable to do so, as the part of the brain that manages spontaneous breathing may not be functioning.

Whether conscious or not, the patient may be placed in the recovery position, laying on their side. In addition to relaxing the patient, this can have the effect of clearing the tongue from the pharynx. It also avoids a common cause of death in unconscious patients, which is choking on regurgitated stomach contents.

The airway can also become blocked by a foreign object. To dislodge the object and solve the choking case, the first aider may use anti-choking methods (such as 'back slaps, 'chest thrusts' or 'abdominal thrusts').

Once the airway has been opened, the first aider would reassess the patient's breathing. If there is no breathing, or the patient is not breathing normally (e.g., agonal breathing), the first aider would initiate CPR, which attempts to restart the patient's breathing by forcing air into the lungs. They may also manually massage the heart to promote blood flow around the body.

If the choking person is an infant, the first aider may use anti-choking methods for babies. During that procedure, series of five strong blows are delivered on the infant's upper back after placing the infant's face in the aider's forearm. If the infant is able to cough or cry, no breathing assistance should be given. Chest thrusts can also be applied with two fingers on the lower half of the middle of the chest. Coughing and crying indicate the airway is open and the foreign object will likely to come out from the force the coughing or crying produces.

A first responder should know how to use an Automatic External Defibrillator (AED) in the case of a person having a sudden cardiac arrest. The survival rate of those who have a cardiac arrest outside of the hospital is low. Permanent brain damage sets in after five minutes of no oxygen delivery, so rapid action on the part of the rescuer is necessary. An AED is a device that can examine a heartbeat and produce electric shocks to restart the heart.

A first aider should be prepared to quickly deal with less severe problems such as cuts, grazes or bone fracture. They may be able to completely resolve a situation if they have the proper training and equipment. For situations that are more severe, complex or dangerous, a first aider might need to do the best they can with the equipment they have, and wait for an ambulance to arrive at the scene.

== First aid kits ==
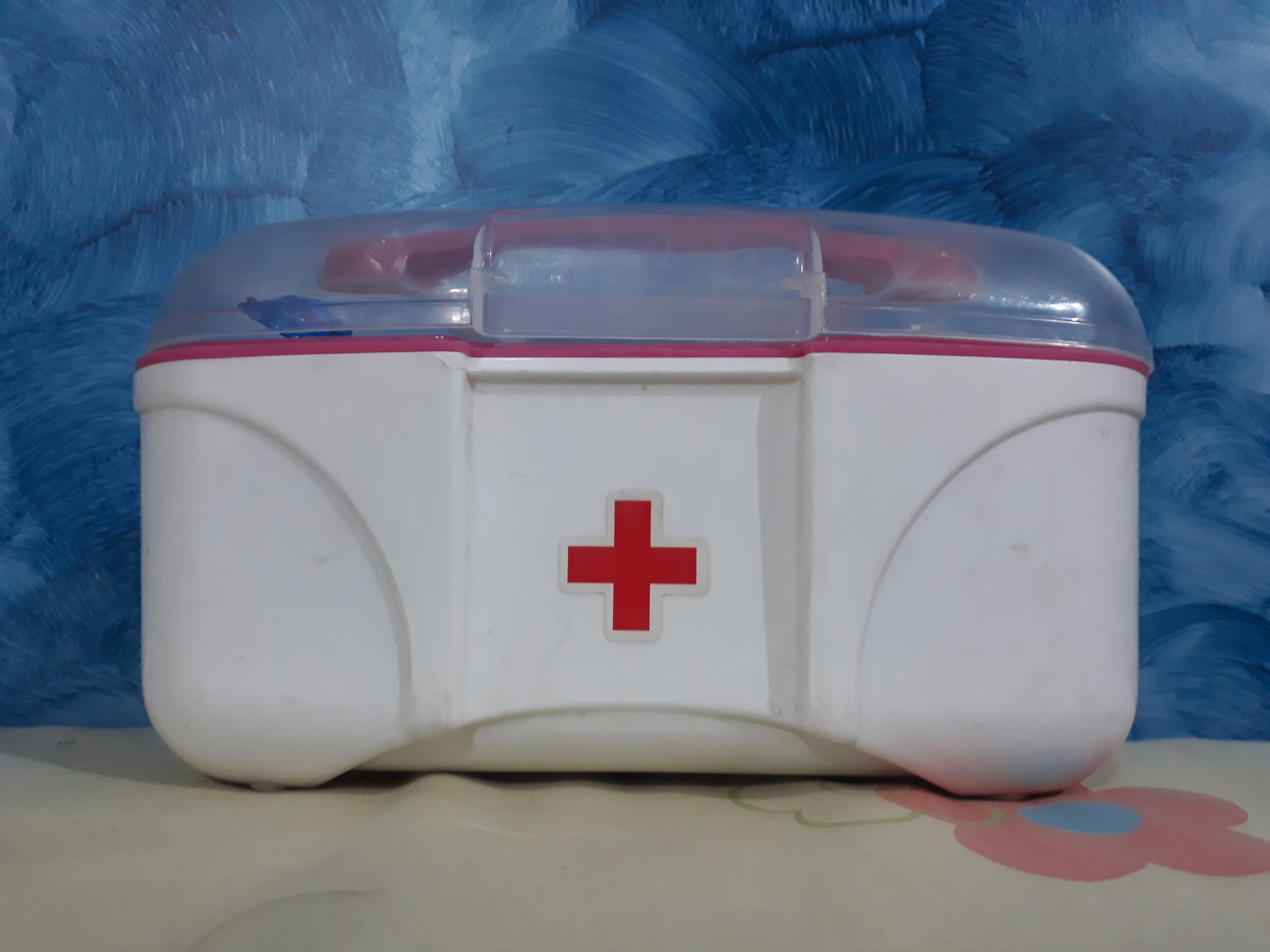
A first aid box

A first aid kit consists of a strong, durable bag or transparent plastic box. They are commonly identified with a white cross on a green background. A first aid kit does not have to be bought ready-made. The advantage of ready-made first aid kits are that they have well organized compartments and familiar layouts.

=== Contents ===
There is no universal agreement upon the list for the contents of a first aid kit. The UK Health and Safety Executive stress that the contents of workplace first aid kits will vary according to the nature of the work activities. As an example of possible contents of a kit, British Standard BS 8599 First Aid Kits for the Workplace lists the following items:

- Information leaflet
- Medium sterile dressings
- Large sterile dressings
- Bandages
- Triangular dressings
- Safety pins
- Adhesive dressings
- Sterile wet wipes
- Microporous tape
- Nitrile gloves
- Face shield
- Foil blanket
- Burn dressings
- Clothing shears
- Conforming bandages
- Finger dressing
- Antiseptic cream
- Scissors
- Tweezers
- Cotton

== Training principles ==
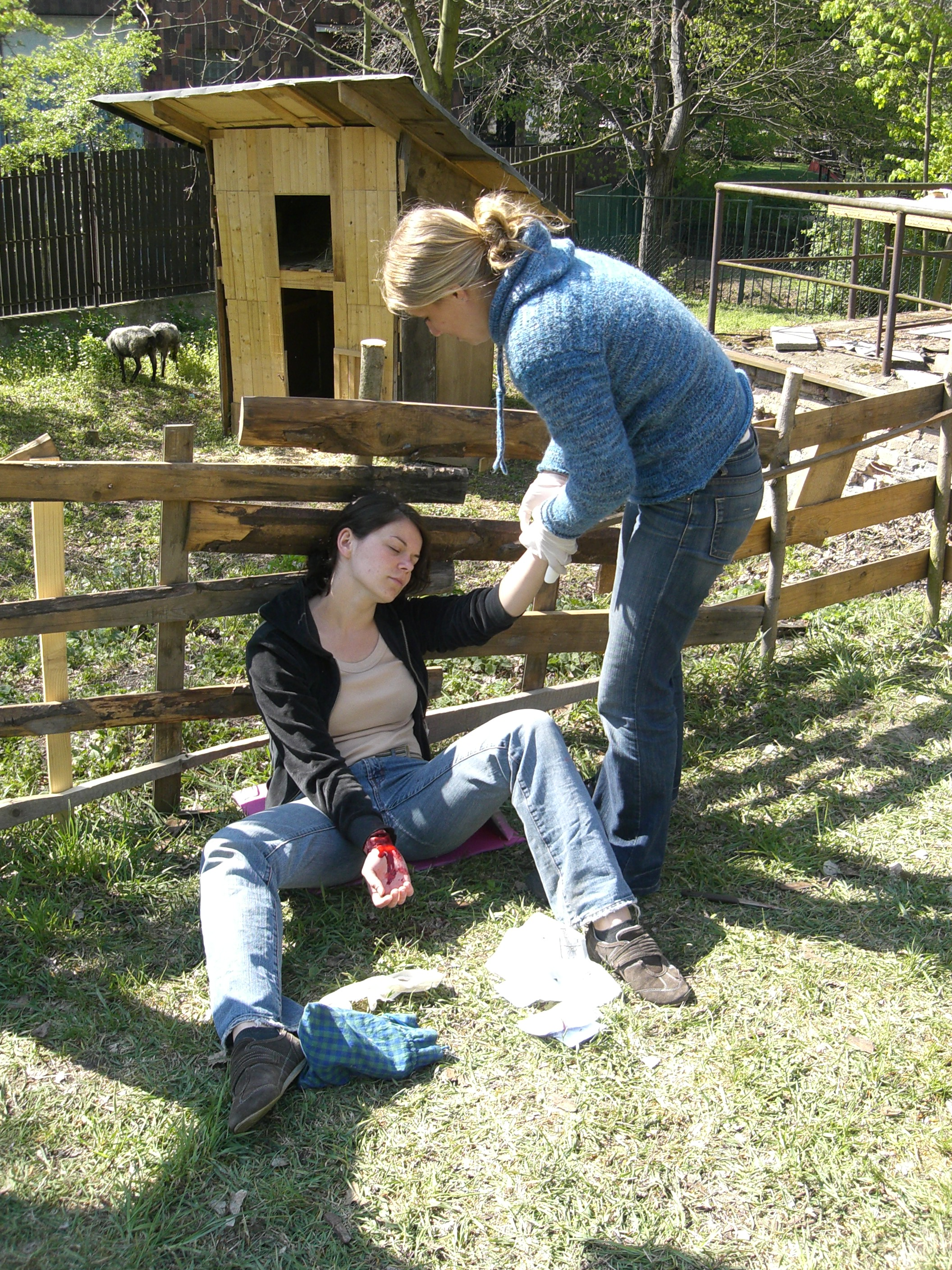
First aid scenario training in progress

Basic principles, such as knowing the use of adhesive bandage or applying direct pressure on a bleed, are often acquired passively through life experiences. However, to provide effective, life-saving first aid interventions requires instruction and practical training. This is especially true where it relates to potentially fatal illnesses and injuries, such as those that require CPR; these procedures may be invasive, and carry a risk of further injury to the patient and the provider. As with any training, it is more useful if it occurs before an actual emergency. And, in many countries, calling emergency medical services allows listening basic first aid instructions over the phone while the ambulance is on the way.

Training is generally provided by attending a course, typically leading to certification. Due to regular changes in procedures and protocols, based on updated clinical knowledge, and to maintain skill, attendance at regular refresher courses or re-certification is often necessary. First aid training is often available through community organizations such as the Red Cross and St. John Ambulance, or through commercial providers, who will train people for a fee. This commercial training is most common for training of employees to perform first aid in their workplace. Many community organizations also provide a commercial service, which complements their community programmes.

1.Junior level certificate Basic Life Support

2.Senior level certificate

3.Special certificate

=== Types of first aid which require training ===
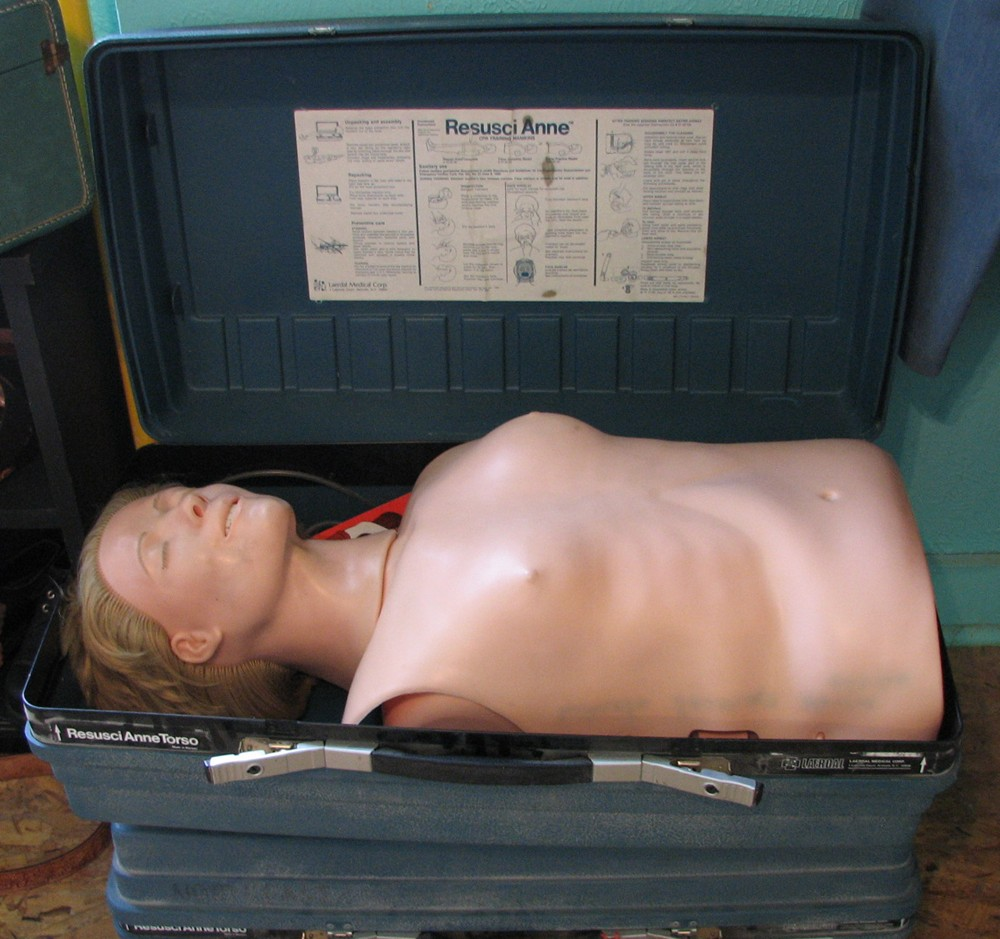
Shown here is an example of a way for people to practice CPR in a safe and reliable manner.

There are several types of first aid (and first aider) that require specific additional training. These are usually undertaken to fulfill the demands of the work or activity undertaken.

- Aquatic/Marine first aid is usually practiced by professionals such as lifeguards, professional mariners or in diver rescue, and covers the specific problems which may be faced after water-based rescue or delayed MedEvac.
- Battlefield first aid takes into account the specific needs of treating wounded combatants and non-combatants during armed conflict.
- Conflict First Aid focuses on support for stability and recovery of personal, social, group or system well-being and to address circumstantial safety needs.
- Hyperbaric first aid may be practiced by underwater diving professionals, who need to treat conditions such as decompression sickness.
- Oxygen first aid is the providing of oxygen to casualties with conditions resulting in hypoxia. It is also a standard first aid procedure for underwater diving incidents where gas bubble formation in the tissues is possible.
- Wilderness first aid is the provision of first aid under conditions where the arrival of emergency responders or the evacuation of an injured person may be delayed due to constraints of terrain, weather, and available persons or equipment. It may be necessary to care for an injured person for several hours or days.
- Mental health first aid is taught independently of physical first aid. How to support someone experiencing a mental health problem or in a crisis situation. Also how to identify the first signs of someone developing mental ill health and guide people towards appropriate help.

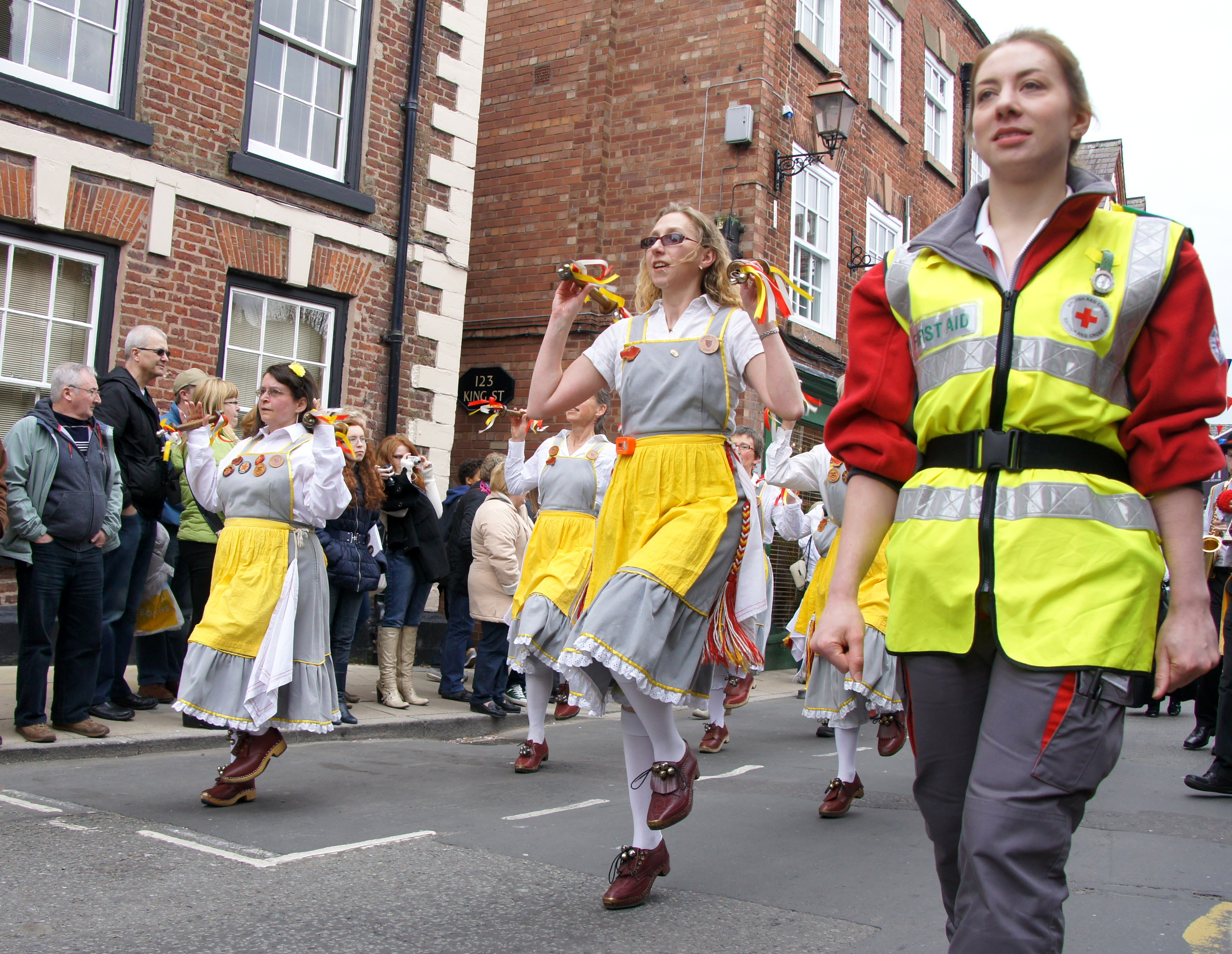
First aider of the British Red Cross accompanies parade of morris dancers at the Knutsford Royal May Day, Knutsford, Cheshire, England, 2012

== First aid services ==
Some people undertake specific training in order to provide first aid at public or private events, during filming, or other places where people gather. They may be designated as a first aider, or use some other title. This role may be undertaken on a voluntary basis, with organisations such as the Red Cross society and St. John Ambulance, or as paid employment with a medical contractor.

People performing a first aid role, whether in a professional or voluntary capacity, are often expected to have a high level of first aid training and are often uniformed.

== Symbols ==
Although commonly associated with first aid, the symbol of a red cross is an official protective symbol of the Red Cross. According to the Geneva Conventions and other international laws, the use of this and similar symbols is reserved for official agencies of the International Red Cross and Red Crescent, and as a protective emblem for medical personnel and facilities in combat situations. Use by any other person or organization is illegal, and may lead to prosecution.

The internationally accepted symbol for first aid is the white cross on a green background shown below.

Some organizations may make use of the Star of Life, although this is usually reserved for use by ambulance services, or may use symbols such as the Maltese Cross, like the Order of Malta Ambulance Corps and St John Ambulance. Other symbols may also be used.

Star of Life

Civil defense

Emblem of the Red Crystal

Emblem of the Red Crescent

Emblem of the Red Cross

ISO First Aid Symbol (Crescent variant)

ISO First Aid Symbol

Maltese or Amalfi Cross
