= Sturba =

Sturba may refer to:

- Sturba (Livanjsko Polje), a river of Bosnia and Herzegovina

== People with the surname ==
- Alessandro Sturba (born 1972), Italian footballer
