= Simone Farina =

Italian footballer

Personal information
- Full name: Simone Farina
- Date of birth: 18 April 1982 (age 44)
- Place of birth: Rome, Italy
- Height: 1.79 m (5 ft 10 in)
- Position: Defender

Team information
- Current team: Siena (general manager)

Youth career
- Roma

Senior career*
Years	Team	Apps	(Gls)
2001–2002	Roma	0	(0)
2001–2002	→ Catania (loan)	2	(0)
2002–2004	Cittadella	17	(1)
2004–2006	Gualdo	54	(0)
2006–2007	Celano	28	(2)
2007–2012	Gubbio	58	(2)
Total		159	(5)

International career
1997–1998	Italy U15	2	(0)
- * Club domestic league appearances and goals as of 22:20, 5 April 2010 (UTC)

Simone Farina (born 18 April 1982) is a former Italian footballer who played as a defender, currently working as general manager of Serie D Group E club Siena.

== Career ==
=== Early career ===
Born in Rome and a fan of Lazio, Farina started his career at A.S. Roma and was a member of the Primavera U20 youth team in the 2000–01 season. In the 2001–02 season, he left for Catania on loan. He played twice for Catania in Serie C1 and won promotion playoffs with the Sicilian club.

=== Roma's False accounting scandal ===
On 28 June 2002, he was exchanged with Alessandro Sturba, who only played twice in Serie A, though both players were tagged for the nominal value of €2.4 million. Co-currently, Roma bought back Farina's 50% registration rights (co-ownership deal) for €1.2M. Roma also made similar deals with other clubs before the end of the fiscal year on 30 June 2002, and created a "profit" of €55million by selling their youth players. In 2004, Roma was investigated and was fined €60,000 on 30 October 2007 by the Criminal Court of Rome for irregular transferring of youth players.

=== Cittadella ===
At Cittadella, Farina only played 17 times in two seasons with the club in Serie C1. In June 2004, Roma gave up the remaining rights for free (the nominal value was €1.2M).

=== Serie C2 clubs and Gubbio ===
Farina then left for Serie C2 club Gualdo. After the club went bankrupt, he joined Celano also in Serie C2. In June 2007, he signed a 1-year contract with Serie C2 club Gubbio. With Gubbio he won two promotions, and reached out his career peak by playing in the 2011–12 Serie B with his club.

=== 2011 Italian football scandal ===
He became famous during the 2011 Italian football scandal when he was approached and offered €200,000 by Alessandro Zamperini, a former teammate at A.S. Roma, to influence the outcome of an Italian Cup match between Cesena and Gubbio on 30 November. The player refused and reported the incident to the police, resulting in the arrest of 17 people the following month. Following this, the Italy national team manager Cesare Prandelli invited him to train with the national team for three days as a prize for his honesty. For the same reason, he received an award from Sepp Blatter during the 2011 FIFA Ballon d'Or ceremony.

=== Retirement as a player and appointment by Aston Villa ===
Farina retired from football with Gubbio in 2012. Farina joined Aston Villa first as a community coach in September 2012 and subsequently as Head of Sports Integrity in September 2013. During this role in August 2014 Farina was named a FIFA Ambassador for fair play by Sepp Blatter, also working with the English FA to raise awareness of betting regulations among players.

=== Serie B ===
Farina later became an ambassador for Serie B, having been appointed by Andrea Abodi in May 2015. He had already been a member of the Serie B ethics committee that convenes annually to allocate charitable funds.

=== Siena ===
In the summer of 2023, Farina returned to football as the new general manager of Siena following the club's exclusion and a fresh restart from Eccellenza. The club went on to win promotion to Serie D on their first season.

Sporting positions
Preceded by Amin Motevaselzadeh	FIFA Fair Play Award Winner; 2011	Succeeded by Incumbent
