= Hanna Barysiewicz =

Reputed oldest woman in Belarus (1888–2007)

Hanna Barysevich
- Ганна Барысевiч
- Born: Hanna Adamauna Novitska; 18 May [O.S. 6 May] 1888; Buda, Igumensky Uyezd, Minsk Governorate, Russian Empire
- Died: 23 February 2007 (aged 118); Minsk, Belarus
- Occupation: Farmer
- Employer: kolkhoz in Stary Koychyn
- Spouse: Ipalit Barysevich
- Children: Nina, Valyantsin, Yauhien, 4 died in early childhood
- Parent(s): Adam and Yuzefa Navitski

Hanna Adamauna Barysevich (Belarusian: Ганна Адамаўна Барысевiч, Russian: Анна Адамовна Борисевич; née Navitska; 18 May [O.S. 6 May] 1888 (claimed) – 23 February 2007) was the oldest female resident of Belarus not registered by the Guinness Book of Word Records. Until her death, she was reputedly the oldest resident in the country and, according to the media, in the world. She lived to the claimed age of 118 years and 281 days.

== Early life ==
Hanna Navitska was born in the village of Buda near Ihumen (modern-day Chervyen), to a peasant family of Adam Navitski and his second wife, Yuzefa. When she was sixteen months old (four months according to other data), her mother died. Her father remarried. Navitska was raised by her older stepsister and grandmother.

When Navitska was a child, her family moved to Stary Koychyn (now Byerazino district). Her father, Adam, purchased a piece of land from the owner of the manor. As payment, the Navitski family worked on the landowner's land. Navitska did not attend school and could not write or read:

Girls and older women were not taught to write. Under Lenin in likbez (Note: Ликбез – abbreviation for "ликвидация безграмотности" (elimination of illiteracy), a program to implement a resolution of the Soviet authorities, adopted in 1920, implemented in the 1920s on the territory of the Soviet Union.) they were taught how to make a signature.

During World War I, Navitska's older half-brother (son of Adam Navitski from his first marriage) was killed at the front. In 1917, at the age of 29, she married Ipalit Barysevich, a member of the Selsoviet. She gave birth to seven children, four of whom died in early childhood. Nina, Valyantsin and Yauhien reached adulthood. In 1937, her husband, whom the Soviet authorities considered an enemy of the people, was arrested and exiled to Siberia. Ipalit died in 1940. In interviews, Hanna hardly talked about him, only mentioning that she had forgiven him. She did not remarry.

During the period of collectivization, Barysevich took a job at the kolkhoz in Stary Koychyn and worked there until her retirement. During the German-Soviet war, Barysevich's family helped partisans. Stary Koychyn, where she lived, was invaded by German occupiers in 1941, but the village was recaptured by partisan units shortly thereafter. In 1965, at the age of 77, she retired.

== Later life and death ==
In 1983, at the age of 95, she moved to Minsk, to her daughter Nina's apartment. She died on 23 February 2007, leaving three children, thirteen grandchildren, four great-grandchildren and four great-great-grandchildren.

== Longevity record ==
The media became interested in Barysevich in 2004. When the woman exchanged her passport, officials noted the petitioner's age - 115. Initially a mistake was suspected.

Prior to the release of the Guinness Book of Records for 2007, the Belarusian side put forward the candidacy of Barysevich as a record holder of longevity, but the Belarusian resident was left out. The reason for this was the doubts of the editors of the publishing house, who did not trust documents published in the former Soviet Union. In 2007, the official longevity record holder was a 114-year-old resident of Japan, while Barysevich was 118 at the time.

In 2007, Barysevich's name as a longevity record holder was entered in the Book of Records of Russia, CIS and Baltic States "Divo" (Книгу рекордов России, стран СНГ и Прибалтики "Диво").

== Media presence ==
Barysevich was the heroine of many interviews and nationally broadcast radio and television programs in several countries until her death. The media tried to discover the "secret" of her longevity, and were interested in the heroine's health condition, diet, views and attitude to the world.

=== Eye surgery ===
In the spring of 2005, Barysevich was the heroine of a program on Radio Liberty. During the broadcast, issues related to her health were raised. Among other things, it was mentioned that the woman was losing her eyesight. The program did not go unnoticed. Alena Dzyanisava, head of the Belarusian company Alkon, which specializes in the production of ophthalmological devices, became interested in Barysevich's case. She made a proposal to study the woman's health and prepare her for eye surgery. The tests showed that the biological age of the 117-year-old Barysevich could be estimated at 75 years. The patient was also diagnosed with cataracts, which was the cause of her vision loss. The surgery was performed by Ihar Pashkin, a candidate of medical sciences. It was planned to implant an artificial lens. The procedure, which lasted 25 minutes, was performed for charity at the Minsk Ophthalmology Hospital Optimied. The case of the surgery was widely reported in the media as setting a record for operating on the oldest patient in the world. A surgery on the second eye was also planned, but did not take place due to Barysevich's death.

=== Lifestyle ===
Barysevich attributed the reason for her longevity to her calm character and philosophical approach to life. She did not complain about difficulties and problems and assured that there were many good things in her life. Barysevich never followed any diet. She consumed ordinary peasant food, as she said in interviews: pork rind, potatoes, milk, eggs, cream, butter and vegetables from her garden. She did not smoke cigarettes, used alcohol moderately, and claimed that she never got drunk in her life. Until the end of her life, Barysevich retained her mental clarity and good memory.

Barysevich declared her affiliation with the Roman Catholic Church and regretted that she could not attend church due to old age.

=== Barysevich as a witness to history ===
Journalists were interested in Barysevich as a witness to history. She was called in the Belarusian press "a peer of three centuries" (ровесница трех веков). They inquired about her attitude toward the authorities of successive regimes, Lenin, Stalin, Brezhnev. They also asked questions about her attitude toward the Belarusian government of the time. In her answer, the woman highlighted the repetition of history. Of all political activists, she respected Vladimir Lenin the most:

He dispersed the capitalists, gave land to the people. [...] Stalin quickly chased everyone into kolkhozes.

She believed that the best period of her life was the Brezhnev era:

Under Brezhnev. When they abolished the tax on every fruit tree. We began to peacefully grow anything we wanted in our garden. And we paid nothing for it.

She was ambivalent about Alexander Lukashenko's presidency and the policies implemented by him. She believed that the district and city authorities were deceiving citizens because they were not meeting their demands. During an interview with the opposition media on her one hundred and seventeenth birthday, referring to the attitude of the authorities toward veterans of the Great Patriotic War, she expressed the view of unequal treatment of war heroes and ordinary citizens:

Military men fought the war with guns, and I fought with a shovel on the land. We dug with the shovel and sowed, because there were no horses, the Germans took them, so I harnessed myself to the plow. Now we don't have any privileges, and those, the military, do. They deserved, and we, who fed the partisans, did not deserve. They gave the military a good pension, and they didn't even give me a good pension...

Barysevich was skeptical of the church hierarchy at the end of her life. In interviews, she spoke of the decline of the authority of clerical power:

Previously, the priest or pop was the father and judge, now - it's just a lie, they care only about their welfare.
