= Julia Brainerd Hall =

American chemist and painter (1859–1926)

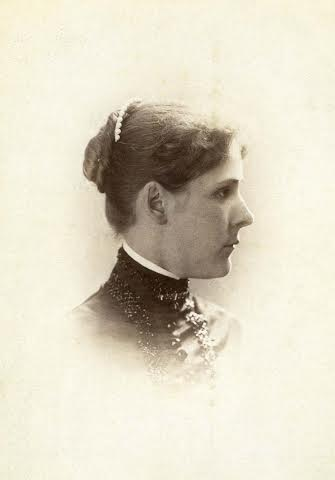
- Julia Brainerd Hall, 1881, Oberlin College Senior Year Portrait
- Born: November 11, 1859; Jamaica
- Died: September 4, 1926 (aged 66); Rochester, New York, US
- Education: Oberlin College

Julia Brainerd Hall (November 11, 1859 – September 4, 1926) was the sister of American scientist Charles Martin Hall. She supported him in his discovery of the Hall process for extracting aluminium from its ore. She was also a still-life painter who exhibited at the Edgar Adams Gallery in Cleveland.

== Early life and education ==
Julia was born on November 11, 1859, to Reverend Heman Bassett Hall (1823–1911) and his wife Sophronia Brooks Hall (1827–1885), missionaries in Jamaica. In 1860, the family returned to the United States. Julia's younger brother, Charles Martin Hall, was born in 1863 in Thompson, Geauga County, Ohio. In 1873, the family moved to Oberlin, Ohio, where Heman Hall and Sophronia Brooks had attended Oberlin College.

Julia was one of eight children. With the exception of a brother (Lewis Albert) who died young, all obtained degrees from Oberlin College. Her eldest brother, George Edward Hall (1851, Jamaica – 1921, Pasadena, California) became a minister. Her older sister Ellen Julia Hall-Kinsey (Mrs. George M. Kinsey, 1852–1882) studied medicine at the University of Wooster, and in Vienna, Austria. Her sister Emily Brooks Hall and Emily's husband Martin Luther Stimson (1857–1943) became missionaries in China.

Julia Brainerd Hall was a student in the Conservatory of Music at Oberlin College from 1876 to 1878. She is listed as a second year student in the "Literary" course at Oberlin as of 1878, and graduated in the Literary course in 1881. The "Literary" course had replaced the "Ladies" course as of July 30, 1875; such educational tracking was usual for women attending Oberlin at the time. One of the classes she took was chemistry, which was taught by William Kedzie in 1879–1880 for only one term prior to his unexpected death, rather than the usual two terms.

Some time before her invalid mother's death in 1885, Julia took over running the household and raising her two younger sisters, Edith May Hall (later Mrs. George H. Seymour, 1865–1937) and Louie Alice Hall (1870–1944).

== Involvement in the Hall process ==
Julia's brother Charles also attended Oberlin, matriculating in 1880 and graduating in 1885. Upon entering college, he approached the new professor of chemistry, Frank Fanning Jewett, to purchase some laboratory equipment. Charles Hall attended Jewett's chemistry course during his junior year, 1883–1884, and conducted research in Jewett's laboratory. Long before he graduated, Charles had set up a laboratory in a woodshed attached to the family home at 64 East College Street in Oberlin, Ohio.

There he researched the production of aluminium by electrolysis, ultimately obtaining a family of patents on April 2, 1889. Charles was successful in a breakthrough experiment of dissolving alumina in molten cryolite at 1000 °C on February 9, 1886, demonstrating the process for his sisters and his father the next day after Julia returned from a visit to Cleveland. After further experiments and the addition of aluminium fluoride, Hall was successful in preparing aluminium by electrolysis. On February 23, 1886, breaking open a clay crucible lined with graphite, he found silvery aluminium pellets inside. Charles Hall took the metal to Frank Jewett for confirmation of the discovery.

Whether Charles Martin Hall or French chemist Paul Héroult should be awarded U.S. patent rights was the subject of an interference proceeding, decided on October 24, 1887. While Héroult had filed his U.S. patent application a few months earlier than Hall, the patent examiner concluded that Hall had discovered the process before Héroult applied for the patent in April 1886. The witnesses for Hall were Charles Hall, Heman Hall, Frank Jewett, another professor, and Julia. Julia testified before the patent examiner that her brother had demonstrated the process successfully in front of her. She had also prepared an account of the History of C.M. Hall's aluminium invention "relying on my memory alone", which was not included in the official U S. record of the patent interference proceedings. Two postmarked letters from Charles Hall to his brother George that described the invention in detail were included as important evidence establishing the timing of Hall's discovery.

The extent to which Julia Brainerd Hall was involved day-to-day in her brother's research and the discovery of the Hall process has been disputed. Her obituary in the Oberlin News, September 30, 1926, stated that "She was a sister of Charles M. Hall and the one who gave him help and encouragement in his work on aluminium." Early accounts by Alcoa company employees, Charles Carr's An American Enterprise (1952) and Junius Edwards' The Immortal Woodshed (1955) portray her as involved in Hall's home laboratory. However, they have been described as "celebratory" and lacking objectivity, and criticized for lacking footnotes and bibliographic information. Martha Trescott draws on these accounts when she makes a case for Julia's close involvement in Charles' laboratory. She argues that the written account that Julia Hall prepared for the patent examiner, and her annotations of Charles Hall's papers, are evidence of her close involvement in the scientific work. Subsequent authors have relied on her accounts.

More recently, Oberlin chemistry professor Norman Craig examined the Oberlin archive's papers and drew different conclusions. He noted that Julia Hall's annotations of the family letters involve replacement of names with initials, and removal of information about the family's financial circumstances, rather than the removal of technical information. Based on the handwriting and references to Charles, he concluded that the annotations were likely made after Charles' death in December 1914. They suggest a review of the papers with a view to publication of a biography. Craig also noted that Charles wrote to various family members about his work, not just Julia, and that he demonstrated his results to his father and younger sisters as well as to Julia. Craig presented the image of a supportive, close-knit, intelligent family, interested in each other's work, rather than a brother-sister research and development team.

Development of the Hall process and its scaling up for industrial use continued over several years, and eventually the Hall process brought the cost of aluminium down from $12.00 per pound to $0.30 per pound.

== Later life ==
In 1901, Charles Hall had a house built for his sisters, Julia, Louie and Edith, at 280 Elm St. in Oberlin, known as the "Hall Sisters House". The original family home on East College Street is now "Hall House", property of Oberlin College. Charles died in 1914.

Julia Brainerd Hall moved to Rochester, New York as of 1917. She died on Saturday, September 4, 1926, at the home that she shared with her sister, Louie Alice Hall, at 1422 Highland Avenue, Rochester, New York. She was buried in Mount Hope Cemetery in Rochester, New York.
