= Friedrich von Esmarch =

German academic (1823–1908)

Johann Friedrich August von Esmarch
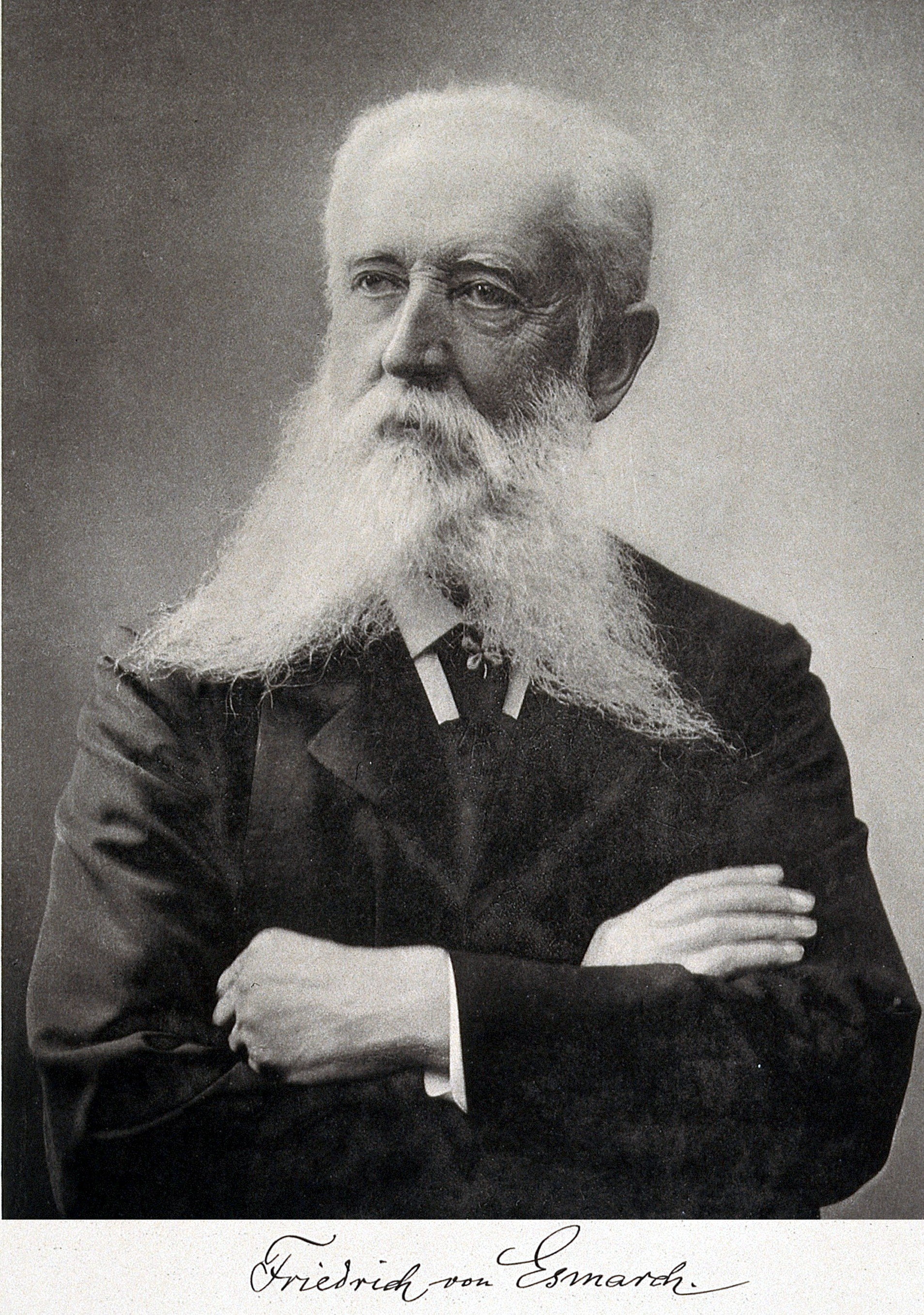
- Born: 9 January 1823; Tönning, Duchy of Schleswig (now Germany)
- Died: 23 February 1908 (aged 85); Kiel, German Empire
- Education: University of Kiel; University of Göttingen
- Known for: Esmarch bandage
- Scientific career
- Fields: Surgery

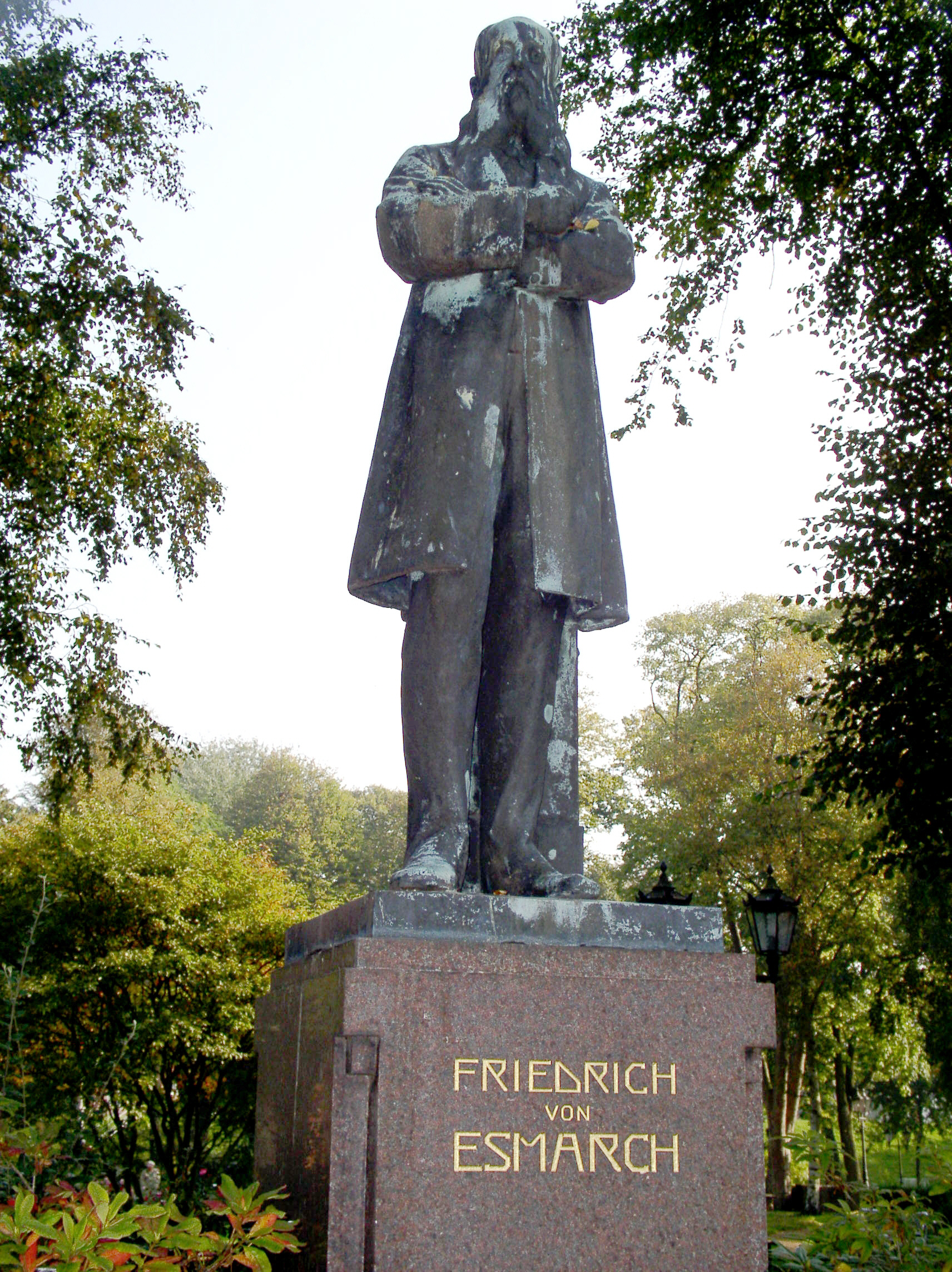
Friedrich von Esmarch, statue by A. Brütt in Tönning (1905)

Johannes Friedrich August von Esmarch (9 January 1823 – 23 February 1908) was a German surgeon. He developed the Esmarch bandage and founded the Deutscher Samariter-Verein, the predecessor of the Deutscher Samariter-Bund.

== Life ==
Esmarch was born in Tönning, Schleswig-Holstein. He studied at Kiel and Göttingen, and in 1846 became Bernhard Rudolf Konrad von Langenbeck's assistant at the Kiel surgical hospital. He served in the Schleswig-Holstein War of 1848 as junior surgeon, and this directed his attention to the subject of military surgery. He was taken prisoner, but afterwards exchanged, and was then appointed as surgeon to a field hospital. During the truce of 1849 he qualified as Privatdocent at Kiel, but on the fresh outbreak of war he returned to the troops and was promoted to the rank of senior surgeon.

In 1854 Esmarch became director of the surgical clinic at Kiel, and in 1857 head of the general hospital and professor at the University of Kiel. During the Schleswig-Holstein War of 1864, Esmarch rendered good service to the field hospitals of Flensburg, Sundewitt and Kiel. In 1866 he was called to Berlin as member of the hospital commission, and also to take the superintendence of the surgical work in the hospitals there. When the Franco-Prussian War broke out in 1870, he was appointed surgeon-general to the army, and afterwards consulting surgeon at the great military hospital near Berlin.

In 1872 Esmarch married Princess Caroline Christiane Auguste Emilie Henriette Elisabeth of Schleswig-Holstein-Sonderburg-Augustenburg (1833–1917), aunt of Empress Augusta Viktoria. In 1887 a patent of nobility was conferred on Esmarch. He died at Kiel.

== Influence ==
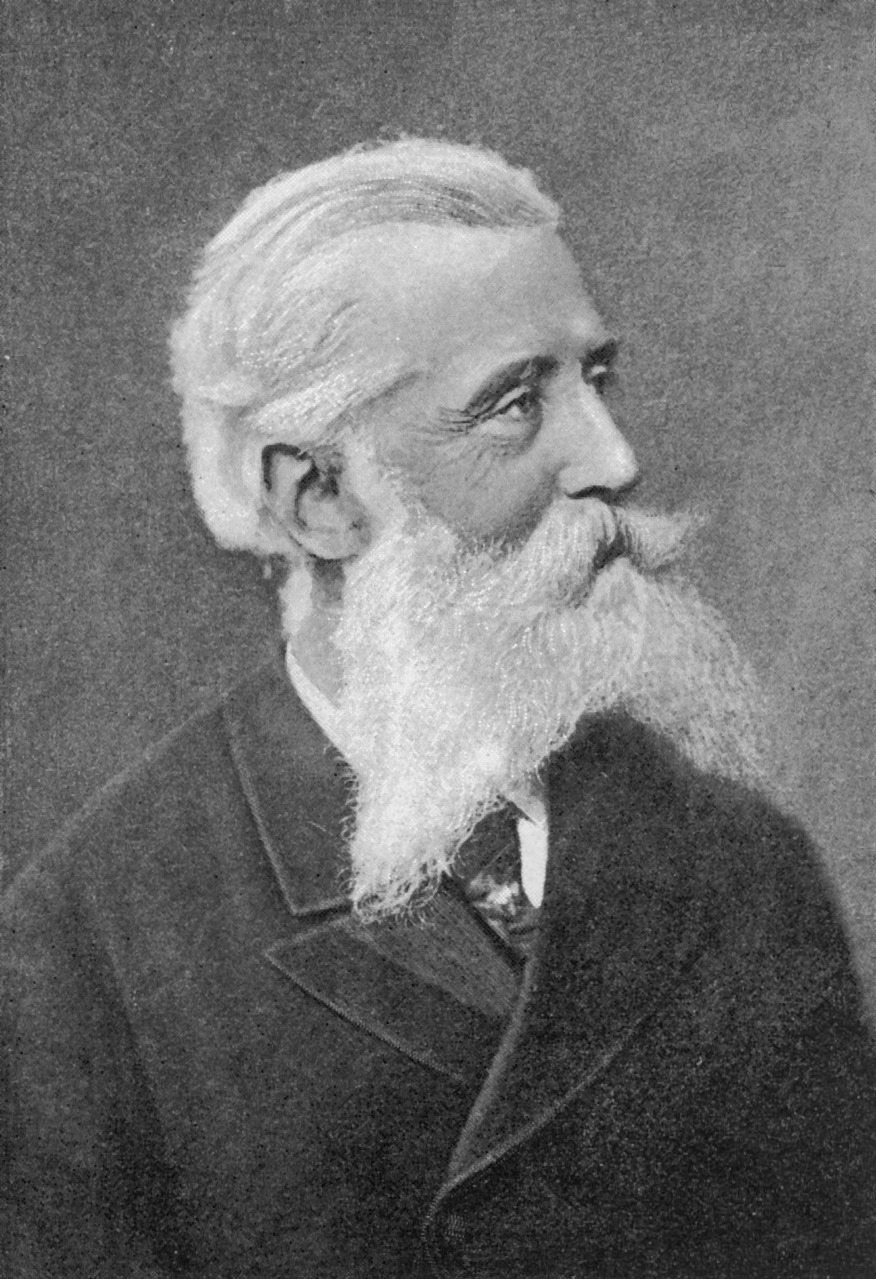

Esmarch was one of the greatest authorities on hospital management and military surgery. His Handbuch der kriegschirurgischen Technik was written for a prize offered by the empress Augusta, on the occasion of the Vienna Exhibition of 1877, for the best handbook for the battlefield of surgical appliances and operations. This book is illustrated by diagrams showing the different methods of bandaging and dressing, as well as the surgical operations as they occur on the battlefield. Esmarch himself invented an apparatus, which bears his name, for keeping a limb nearly bloodless during amputation.

No part of Esmarch's work is more widely known than that which deals with First Aid, his First Aid on the Battlefield and First Aid to the Injured being popular manuals on the subject. The latter is the substance of a course of lectures delivered by him in 1881 to a Samaritan School, the first of the kind in Germany, founded by Esmarch in 1881, in imitation of the St John Ambulance classes which had been organized in England in 1878. These lectures were very generally adopted as a manual for first aid students, edition after edition having been called for, and they have been translated into numerous languages, the English version being the work of HRH Princess Christian.

At the time, no ambulance course would be complete without a demonstration of the Esmarch bandage. It was a three-sided piece of linen or cotton, of which the base measures 120 cm and the sides 85 cm. It could be used folded or open, and applied in thirty-two different ways. It answered every purpose for temporary dressing and field-work, while its great recommendation was that the means for making it were always at hand.

In 1857 Esmarch wrote an article together with the psychiatrist Peter Willers Jessen. They had discovered the connection between syphilis and general paralysis of the insane. Esmarch also observed a link between syphilis and cancer in 1877.
