= American Airlines Flight 009 =

February 1945 plane crash in Rural Retreat, Virginia

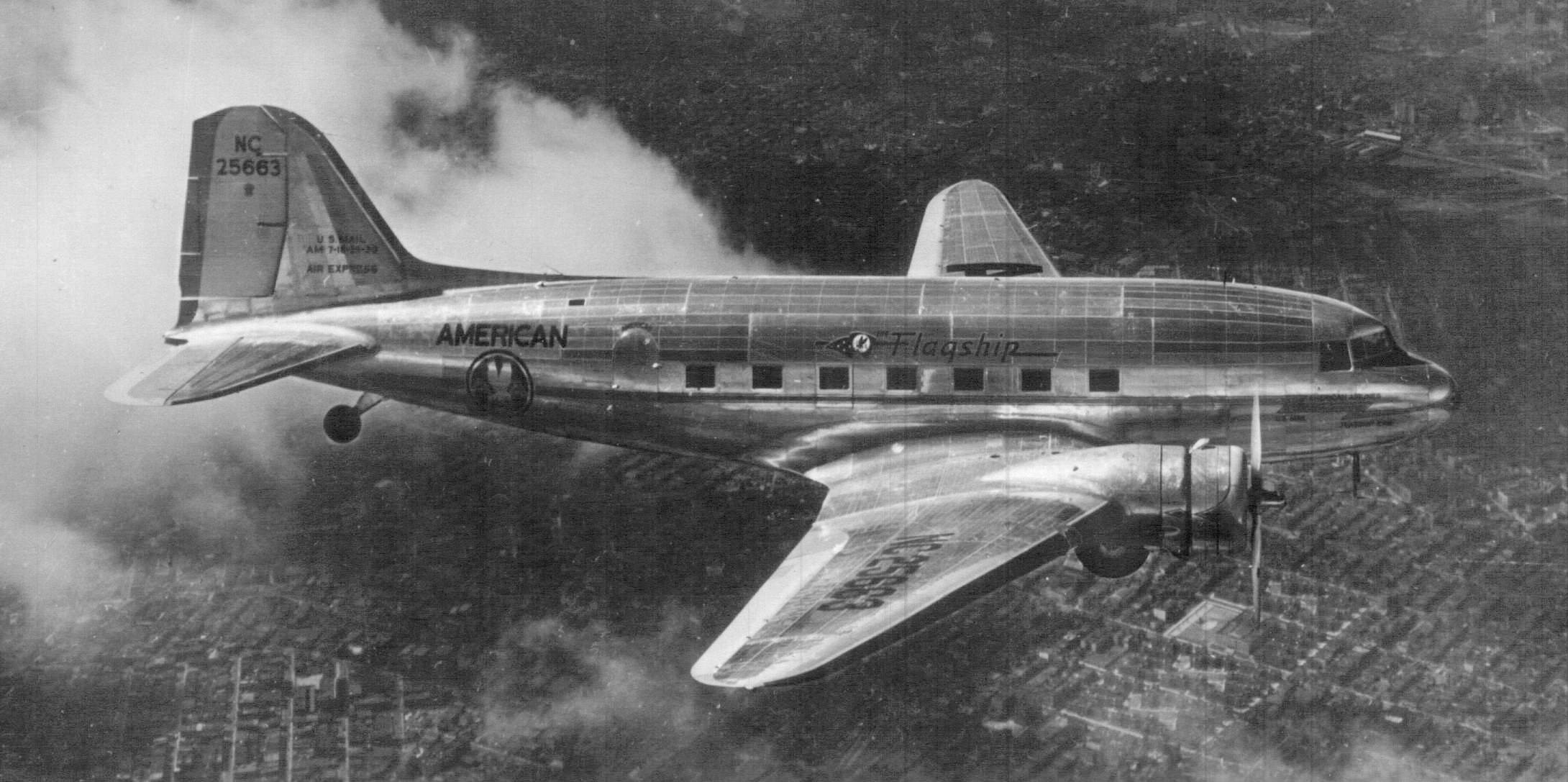
- An American Airlines Douglas DC-3, similar to the accident aircraft

Accident
- Date: February 23, 1945
- Summary: Controlled flight into terrain due to pilot error
- Site: Glade Mountain, 5.5 miles SW of Rural Retreat, Virginia, U.S.; 36°53′36″N 81°16′34″W

Aircraft
- Aircraft type: Douglas DC-3-277
- Operator: American Airlines
- Registration: NC18142
- Flight origin: New York City, New York
- 1st stopover: Ronald Reagan Washington National Airport, Arlington County, Virginia
- 2nd stopover: Nashville International Airport, Nashville, Tennessee
- Destination: Los Angeles, California
- Occupants: 22
- Passengers: 19
- Crew: 3
- Fatalities: 17
- Survivors: 5

American Airlines Flight 009 was a flight from New York City to Los Angeles. On the morning of February 23, 1945, while flying over Rural Retreat, Virginia, on the Washington-Nashville leg, the Douglas DC-3 struck the wooded summit of Glade Mountain in the Appalachian Mountains, killing 17 of the 22 occupants on board.

== Involved aircraft ==
The aircraft involved in the accident was a Douglas DC-3-277, registered as NC18142. It was manufactured in May 1939 and had 17,296 hours of flying time.

== Accident ==
American Airlines Flight 009 departed New York City at 9:39 p.m. on February 22, 1945. Upon leaving Washington at 12:11 a.m. on the morning of February 23, there had been no indication of trouble. The last radio message from the captain was at 2:05 a.m., giving the plane's position as 4000 feet over Pulaski, Virginia. While cruising and flying in a southwesterly direction, as it was descending through rain and clouds, the plane impacted wooded terrain approximately 3,910 feet above sea level. Wreckage was strewn over a path of 450 feet.

== Rescue work ==
One of the survivors, Irving Schwartz, dragged a man with a hip fracture to a shelter close to the airplane. As it was freezing and they were only wearing short sleeve shirts, he got coats from the airplane and ripped a piece of carpet off the floor to use as a covering. Even though he could hear voices, Schwartz was unable to find other survivors due to the darkness. In the morning, Schwartz was able to find one other survivor, the flight attendant, Padgett. Even though she was severely injured, Schwartz was able to bring her to the shelter. The wreck was sighted from the air at 12:40 pm that day. The searchers were unable to see any survivors so the assumption was made that all of the passengers had perished. Family members of the passengers were given the grim news. It took almost fourteen hours after the crash for the rescue workers to reach the crash site where they found the three survivors in the shelter. A fourth survivor was found nearby. The fifth survivor had wandered down the mountain and was found by a farmer.

== Victims ==
In total 17 people were killed in the crash, including the two pilots. All others were seriously injured.

=== Crew members ===
- James E. Stroud (age 35), the captain of the flight. He was properly certified and qualified for the flight.
- Robert E. Brigman (age 24), first officer. He was properly certified and qualified for the flight.
- Sarah Worley "Sally" Padgett (age 23), flight attendant. She had a fractured skull, a broken collarbone, a concussion and gangrene in her left ankle. She had to recover for three months. She continued her career as Navy officer. She married and had two children. After her husband died she moved in 1999 to The Cypress of Charlotte retirement community; living close to her daughter.

=== Surviving passengers ===
- Irving Schwartz (25 years old) was at the time second lieutenant in the Marines shipping out to World War II. He had an injured spine and a smashed shoulder. He was for four months in the hospital.
- An unnamed man who was helped by Schwartz had a fractured hip.

=== Reunion of survivors ===
After Schwartz was released from the hospital, he was able to get in contact with three other survivors, though initially, he was unable to get in contact with Padgett. Schwartz's brother also lived at The Cypress of Charlotte retirement community. After the story of Padgett was published in The Cypress newsletter and was noticed by the daughter of Schwartz' brother, Schwartz and Padgett were re-united in November 2003, nearly 60 years after the crash.

== Investigation ==
CAB Accident Report

According to the survivors, the plane was in a rainstorm and one of the engines had troubles.

=== Probable cause ===
According to the Civil Aeronautics Board's investigation, the probable cause of this accident was:

- The pilot's failure to properly plan the flight and remain at a safe instrument altitude under existing conditions of bad weather.
- A contributing cause of the accident was the company's laxity in dispatching and supervising the flight.
