= Esmarch bandage =

Wound dressing and medical tool

The Esmarch bandage (also known as Esmarch's bandage for surgical haemostasis or Esmarch's tourniquet), in its modern form, is a narrow (5 to 10 cm (2.0 to 3.9 in) wide) soft rubber bandage that is used to expel venous blood from a limb (exsanguinate) that has had its arterial supply cut off by a tourniquet. The limb is often elevated as the elastic pressure is applied. The exsanguination is necessary to enable some types of delicate reconstructive surgery where bleeding would obscure the working area. A bloodless area is also required to introduce local anaesthetic agents for a regional nerve block. This method was first described by Augustus Bier in 1908.

The original version was designed by Friedrich von Esmarch, professor of surgery at Kiel University, Germany, and is generally used in battlefield medicine. Esmarch himself had been surgeon general to the German army during the Franco-German War. It consisted of a three-sided piece of linen or cotton, the base measuring 120 cm (47 in) and the sides 85 cm (33 in). It could be used folded or open, and applied in thirty-two different ways. An improved form was devised by Bernhard von Langenbeck later on.

Esmarch bandages are also used by cardiac surgeons in delayed mediastinal closure for patients who have experienced certain complications post cardiac surgery (e.g. myocardial oedema or severe postoperative bleeding).

== Soviet use ==
A pink-coloured variant of this medical tool was issued out to Soviet infantry as early as the Soviet–Afghan War. The Esmarch tourniquet did not function well due to how easily the rubber could stretch and the lack of means to provide pressure.

There are many pictures of the Esmarch bandage, during the Afghanistan and Russian-Chechen Wars, being used to aid with the comfort of the firearm stock, or a supposed attempt to make it more easily accessible. However, the quality of the rubber, and the general properties of similar types of rubber result in problems of the materials becoming hard and brittle when exposed to heat and sand over multiple hours or days. They are also not suitable for repeated use, as they wear out quickly.

Newer versions of this medical device, made in Russia for military or survival use, are orange and are made of more durable materials.

== See also ==
- Tourniquet
- Amputation
- Battlefield medicine

== General references ==
- Josa, M; Khuri, S. F; Braunwald, N. S; Vancisin, M. F; Spencer, M. P; Evans, D. A; Barsamian, E. M (1986). "Delayed sternal closure. An improved method of dealing with complications after cardiopulmonary bypass". The Journal of Thoracic and Cardiovascular Surgery. 91 (4): 598–603. doi:10.1016/S0022-5223(19)36030-1. PMID 3959580.
