= Alessandro Sturba =

Italian footballer (born 1972)

Personal information
- Date of birth: 23 February 1972 (age 54)
- Place of birth: Rome, Italy
- Height: 1.73 m (5 ft 8 in)
- Positions: Midfielder; forward

Youth career
- Romulea
- 1991–1992: Verona

Senior career*
Years	Team	Apps	(Gls)
1991–1993	Verona	5	(0)
1992–1993	→ Carrarese (loan)	16	(1)
1993–1994	Siena	13	(0)
1994–1995	Crevalcore	21	(3)
1995–1996	Massese	31	(1)
1996–1998	Andria	64	(8)
1998–1999	Siena	14	(0)
1999–2000	Livorno	36	(3)
2000–2002	Cittadella	66	(17)
2002–2005	Roma	0	(0)
2002–2003	→ Venezia (loan)	6	(0)
2003	→ Salernitana (loan)	12	(0)
2003–2004	→ Catania (loan)	17	(0)
2005	→ Teramo (loan)	11	(0)
2005–2006	Lucchese	22	(1)
Total		334	(34)
- * Club domestic league appearances and goals

Alessandro Sturba (born 23 February 1972) is a former Italian footballer.

== Biography ==
Born in Rome, Sturba started his professional career at Verona, northern Italy. Sturba made his Serie A debut on 17 November 1991, replaced Claudio Lunini in the 69th minutes. He played the next league match as starter against Torino, which ended in 0–0 draw. He then spent seasons in Serie C1 clubs, which he won the champion in 1997 for Andria. After a Serie B season with Andria, he left for Serie C1 (group A) side Siena. But in mid-season joined Livorno, at that time in the same group. In 2000, he joined Serie B side Cittadella, which he played 2 seasons.

=== Roma ===
On 28 June 2002, 2 days before the closure of 2001–02 fiscal year, he was surprisingly signed by Roma in exchange deal, signed a 3-year contract, to swap club with Simone Farina who both tagged for €2.4 million. Roma also bought back half of Farina's registration rights for €1.2million. That week Roma also swap backup players and even youth players with other teams with inflated price, and gained a "profit" of €55million. Sturba was named one of the victim of doping administration by the media, which Roma suspected to use cross-trading (exchange player with same price and contract length) and inflated the price in order to increase the profit of selling player. In although they did not received real money of selling player, the acquire cost was to amortized proportionality during the player contract (usually multi-year), overall it still appeared a profit in the first year fiscal report, in although most of the nominal value of the registration rights of new signings, were far higher than the fair value. Thus like took drug to enhance the economic situation.

That led to an investigation by prosecutor of Rome for a suspected false accounting in 2004. But Roma was fined €60,000 on 30 October 2007 by Criminal Court of Rome for irregularity on youth players transfer only, as cross trading and inflating the price itself is not illegal, prosecutor failed to prove the purpose behind is illegal against the clubs.

Sturba was loaned to Serie B side Venezia on 31 August 2002, but in January 2003 loaned to league rival Salernitana. In 2003–04 season, he was loaned to Catania, also at Serie B, but the loan came early end in May 2004.

Sturba failed to play in the first half of the season as no club willing to loan him. In the second half of 2004–05 season, he joined Teramo where he joined Luigi Panarelli and Alberto Schettino, who also acquired by Roma in 2002.

=== Lucchese ===
In summer 2005, he joined Serie C1 side Lucchese and then retired.
