= Arthrology =

Scientific study of joints and articulations

Arthrology is the branch of anatomy that studies the joints of the body — how bones connect, the structures involved, and how they allow movement.

Arthrology is the science concerned with the study of the anatomy, function, dysfunction and treatment of joints and articulations.

The prefix "arthro-" refers to joints, as in arthrogram, arthroscopy, or arthritis, from the Greek ἄρθρον arthron. Arthrology is also referred to as arthrologia, syndesmologia, syndesmology, and synosteology. Specialists in this field are known as arthrologists.

Famous Arthologists include:

- William Musgrave (Latin: Guilhelmus Musgrave; 1655–1721), His important medical works concerned arthritis and its effects. His publication De arthritide symptomatica (2nd edn, 1715) included the first scientific description of ‘Devonshire colic’ (later referred to by John Huxham and George Baker).
- John Charnley (29 August 1911 – 5 August 1982), completed the first hip replacement (total hip arthroplasty) in England to treat arthritis in the 1960s.
- Kenji Takagi (1888–1963), noted for being one of the first people to carry out a successful arthroscopy of the knee.
- Eugen Bircher, published several groundbreaking papers detailing arthroscopy procedures on the knee
- Masaki Watanabe, sometimes called the "founder of modern arthroscopy". Watanabe developed the first practical arthroscope.
- Robert Jackson, credited with bringing arthroscopy to the Western world, served as a physician for the Canadian Olympic team in 1964
- James H. Lubowitz, editor of Arthroscopy: The Journal of Arthroscopic and Related Surgery
