= Synthol =

Synthol may refer to:

- Synthol, a site enhancement oil (SEO), a body-building substance
- Synthol (mouthwash), a French brand of liquid painkiller/mouthwash now owned by GlaxoSmithKline
- Synthetic oil, often referred to by nicknames such as "synthol" and "synthoil"
