= Postarthroscopic glenohumeral chondrolysis =

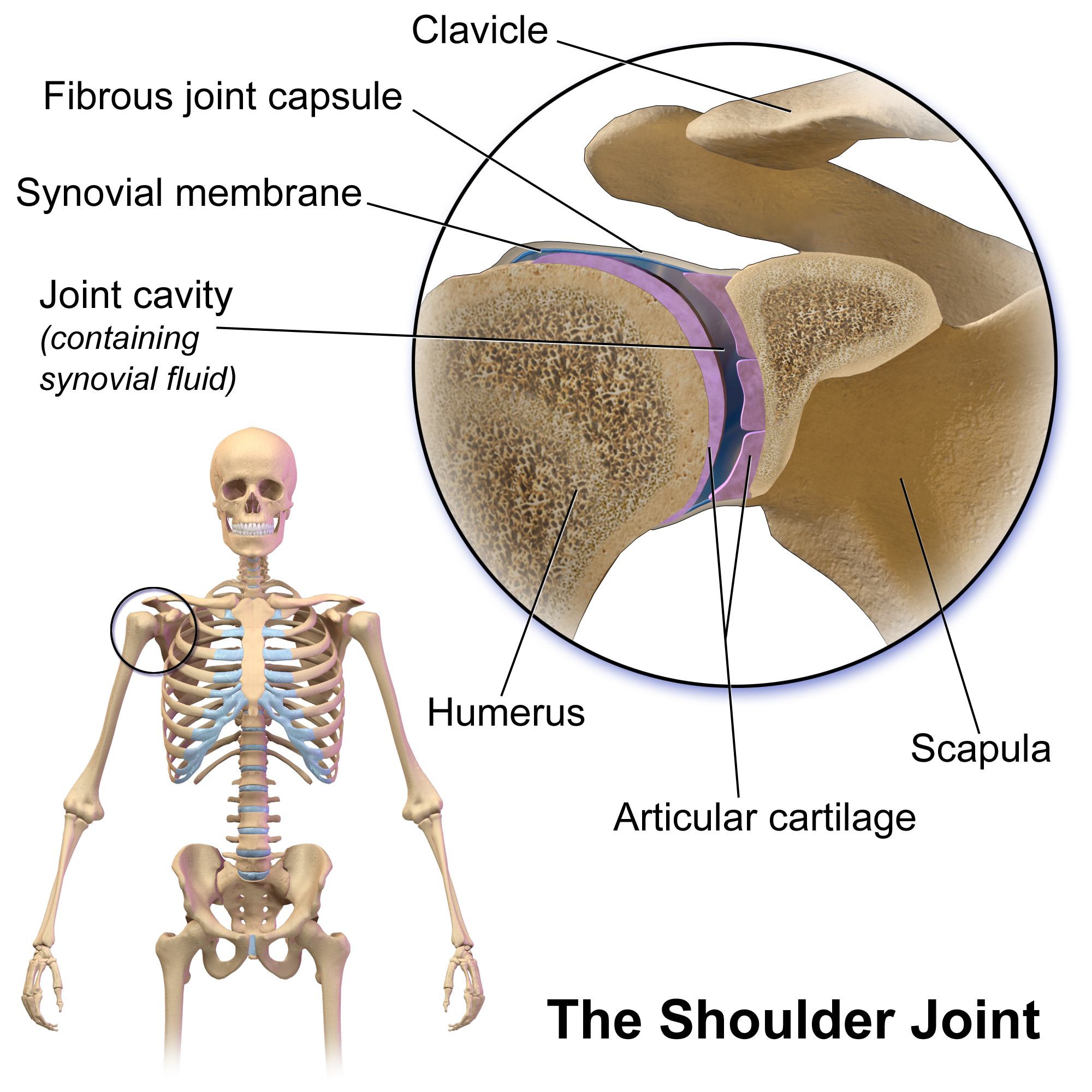
- Human shoulder (joint)
- Specialty: Orthopedic
- Risk factors: Complication of arthroscopic surgery

Postarthroscopic glenohumeral chondrolysis (PAGCL) is a rare complication of arthroscopic surgery and involves chondrolysis wherein the articular cartilage of the shoulder undergoes rapid, degenerative changes shortly after arthroscopic surgery.

== Causes ==
Bupivacaine, lidocaine, ropivacaine and levobupivacaine are all toxic to cartilage and their intra-articular infusions can lead to this toxic effect. Intra-articular pain pumps with local anesthetics have been implicated as a potential cause.

== Treatment ==
Total Joint Arthroplasty or reverse total joint arthroplasty (shoulder replacement surgery)
