= Lidocaine =

Local anesthetic

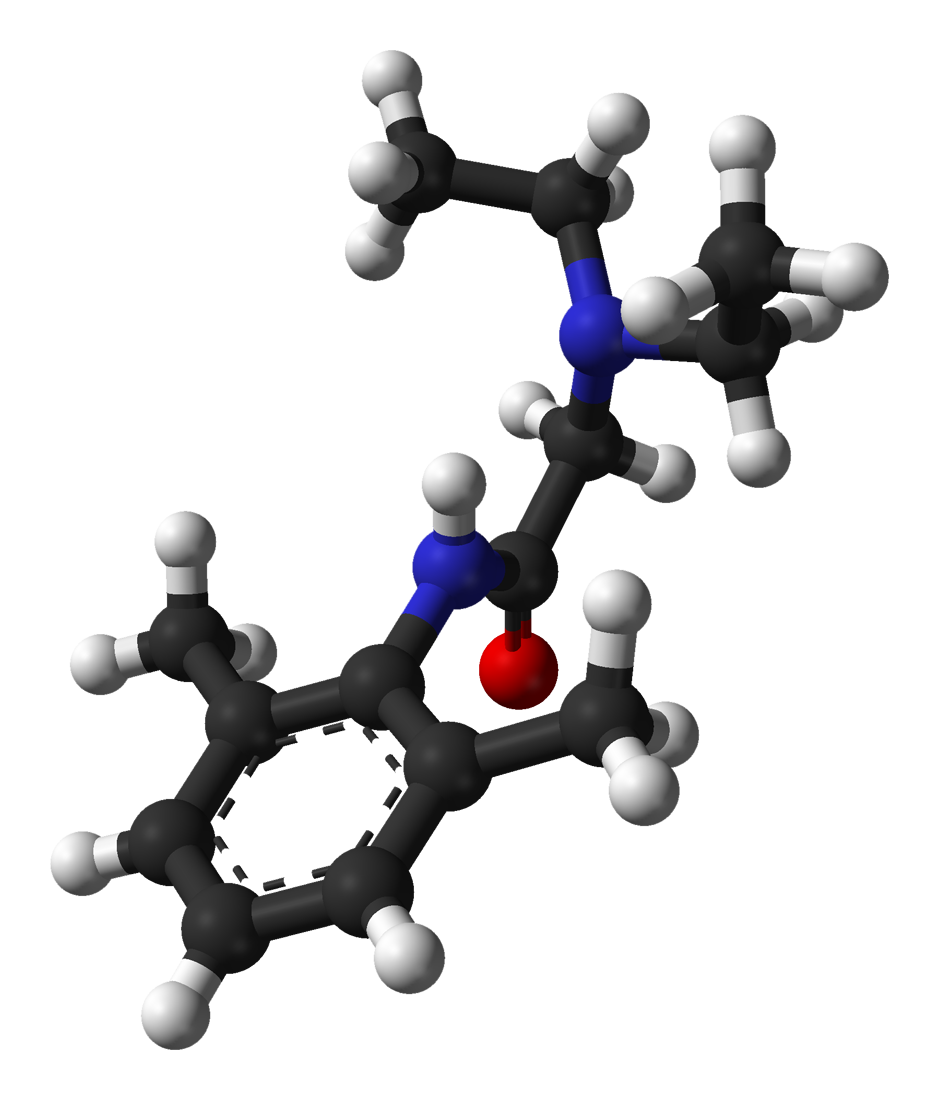

Clinical data
- Pronunciation: Lidocaine: /ˈlaɪdəkeɪn/ LY-də-kayn; Lignocaine: /ˈlɪɡnəkeɪn/ LIG-nə-kayn
- Trade names: Xylocaine, others
- Other names: lignocaine
- AHFS/Drugs.com: Local Monograph Systemic Monograph Ophthalmic Professional Drug Facts
- MedlinePlus: a682701
- License data: US DailyMed: Lidocaine
- Pregnancy category: AU: A
- Routes of administration: Intravenous, subcutaneous, topical, by mouth
- Drug class: Local anesthetic; Antiarrhythmic agent
- ATC code: C01BB01 (WHO) C05AD01 (WHO) D04AB01 (WHO) N01BB02 (WHO) N01BB52 (WHO) R02AD02 (WHO) S01HA07 (WHO) S02DA01 (WHO) QC01BB01 (WHO) QC05AD01 (WHO) QD04AB01 (WHO) QN01BB02 (WHO) QN01BB52 (WHO) QR02AD02 (WHO) QS01HA07 (WHO) QS02DA01 (WHO) QD04AB51 (WHO)

Legal status
- Legal status: AU: S5, S4, and S2; CA: OTC / Rx-only; UK: GSL, P, and POM; US: OTC / Rx-only

Pharmacokinetic data
- Bioavailability: 35% (by mouth); 3% (topical)
- Metabolism: Liver, 90% CYP3A4-mediated
- Onset of action: Within 1.5 min (IV)
- Elimination half-life: 1.5 h to 2 h
- Duration of action: 10 min to 20 min (IV), 0.5 h to 3 h (local)
- Excretion: Kidney

Identifiers
- IUPAC name: 2-(diethylamino)- N-(2,6-dimethylphenyl)acetamide
- CAS Number: 137-58-6; as HCl: 73-78-9
- PubChem CID: 3676; as HCl: 6314
- IUPHAR/BPS: 2623
- DrugBank: DB00281; as HCl: DBSALT001508
- ChemSpider: 3548; as HCl: 6075
- UNII: 98PI200987; as HCl: EC2CNF7XFP
- KEGG: D00358; as HCl: D02086
- ChEBI: CHEBI:6456; as HCl: CHEBI:50512
- ChEMBL: ChEMBL79; as HCl: ChEMBL541521
- PDB ligand: LQZ (PDBe, RCSB PDB)
- CompTox Dashboard (EPA): DTXSID1045166
- ECHA InfoCard: 100.004.821

Chemical and physical data
- Formula: C_{14}H_{22}N_{2}O
- Molar mass: 234.343 g·mol^{−1}
- 3D model (JSmol): Interactive image
- Melting point: 68 °C (154 °F)
- SMILES: Cc1cccc(C)c1NC(=O)CN(CC)CC
- InChI: InChI=1S/C14H22N2O/c1-5-16(6-2)10-13(17)15-14-11(3)8-7-9-12(14)4/h7-9H,5-6,10H2,1-4H3,(H,15,17); Key:NNJVILVZKWQKPM-UHFFFAOYSA-N

Lidocaine, also known as lignocaine and sold under the brand name Xylocaine among others, is a local anesthetic of the amino amide type. It is also used to treat ventricular tachycardia and ventricular fibrillation. When used for local anaesthesia or in nerve blocks, lidocaine typically begins working within several minutes and lasts for half an hour to three hours. Lidocaine mixtures may also be applied directly to the skin or mucous membranes to numb the area. It is often used mixed with a small amount of adrenaline (epinephrine) to prolong its local effects and to decrease bleeding.

If injected intravenously, it may cause cerebral effects such as confusion, changes in vision, numbness, tingling, and vomiting. It can cause low blood pressure and an irregular heart rate. There are concerns that injecting it into a joint can cause problems with the cartilage. It appears to be generally safe for use in pregnancy. A lower dose may be required in those with liver problems. It is generally safe to use in those allergic to tetracaine or benzocaine. Lidocaine is an antiarrhythmic medication of the class Ib type. This means it works by blocking sodium channels thus decreasing the rate of contractions of the heart. When injected near nerves, the nerves cannot conduct signals to or from the brain.

Lidocaine was discovered in 1946 and went on sale in 1948. It is on the World Health Organization's List of Essential Medicines. It is available as a generic medication. In 2023, it was the 277th most commonly prescribed medication in the United States, with more than 800,000 prescriptions.

== Medical uses ==
=== Local numbing agent ===
The efficacy profile of lidocaine as a local anaesthetic is characterized by a rapid onset of action and intermediate duration of efficacy. Therefore, lidocaine is suitable for infiltration, block, and surface anaesthesia. Longer-acting substances such as bupivacaine are sometimes given preference for spinal and epidural anaesthesias; lidocaine, though, has the advantage of a rapid onset of action.

Lidocaine is one of the most commonly used local anaesthetics in dentistry. It can be administered in multiple ways, most often as a nerve block or infiltration, depending on the type of treatment carried out and the area of the mouth worked on.

For surface anaesthesia, several formulations can be used for endoscopies, before intubations. Lidocaine drops can be used on the eyes for short ophthalmic procedures. There is tentative evidence for topical lidocaine for neuropathic pain and skin graft donor site pain. As a local numbing agent, it is used for the treatment of premature ejaculation.

An adhesive transdermal patch containing a 5% concentration of lidocaine in a hydrogel bandage, is approved by the US FDA for reducing nerve pain caused by shingles. The transdermal patch is also used for pain from other causes, such as compressed nerves and persistent nerve pain after some surgeries.

=== Heart arrhythmia ===
Lidocaine is a common class-1b antiarrhythmic drug; it is used intravenously for the treatment of ventricular arrhythmias (for acute myocardial infarction, digoxin poisoning, cardioversion, or cardiac catheterization) if amiodarone is not available or contraindicated. Lidocaine should be given for this indication after defibrillation, CPR, and vasopressors have been initiated. A routine preventive dose is no longer recommended after a myocardial infarction as the overall benefit is not convincing.

=== Epilepsy ===
A 2013 review on treatment for neonatal seizures recommended intravenous lidocaine as a second-line treatment, if phenobarbital fails to stop seizures.

=== Other ===
Intravenous lidocaine infusions are also used to treat chronic pain and acute surgical pain as an opiate sparing technique. The quality of evidence for this use is poor so it is difficult to compare it to placebo or an epidural.

Inhaled lidocaine can be used as a cough suppressor acting peripherally to reduce the cough reflex. This application can be implemented as a safety and comfort measure for people needing intubation, as it reduces the incidence of coughing and any tracheal damage it might cause when emerging from anaesthesia.

A 2019 systematic review of the literature found that intraurethral lidocaine reduces pain in men who undergo cystoscopic procedures.

Lidocaine, along with ethanol, ammonia, and acetic acid, may also help in treating jellyfish stings, both numbing the affected area and preventing further nematocyst discharge.

For gastritis, drinking a viscous lidocaine formulation may help with the pain.

A 2021 study found that lidocaine 5% spray on the glans penis 10-20 minutes prior to sexual intercourse significantly improves premature ejaculation. Another study found that lidocaine-prilocaine cream 5% is effective in premature ejaculation and 20 minutes of application time before sexual intercourse.

== Adverse effects ==
Adverse drug reactions (ADRs) are rare when lidocaine is used as a local anesthetic and is administered correctly. Most ADRs associated with lidocaine for anesthesia relate to administration technique (resulting in systemic exposure) or pharmacological effects of anesthesia, and allergic reactions only rarely occur. Systemic exposure to excessive quantities of lidocaine mainly results in central nervous system (CNS) and cardiovascular effects – CNS effects usually occur at lower blood plasma concentrations and additional cardiovascular effects present at higher concentrations, though cardiovascular collapse may also occur with low concentrations. ADRs by individual organ systems are:

- CNS excitation: nervousness, agitation, anxiety, apprehension, tingling around the mouth (circumoral paraesthesia), headache, hyperesthesia, tremor, dizziness, pupillary changes, psychosis, euphoria, hallucinations, and seizures
- CNS depression with heavier exposure: drowsiness, lethargy, slurred speech, hypoesthesia, confusion, disorientation, loss of consciousness, respiratory depression, and apnoea.
- Cardiovascular: hypotension, bradycardia, arrhythmias, flushing, venous insufficiency, increased defibrillator threshold, edema, and/or cardiac arrest – some of which may be due to hypoxemia secondary to respiratory depression.
- Respiratory: bronchospasm, dyspnea, respiratory depression or arrest
- Gastrointestinal: metallic taste, nausea, vomiting, agita, and diarrhea
- Ears: tinnitus
- Eyes: local burning, conjunctival hyperemia, corneal epithelial changes/ulceration, diplopia, visual changes (opacification)
- Skin: itching, depigmentation, rash, urticaria, edema, angioedema, bruising, inflammation of the vein at the injection site, irritation of the skin when applied topically
- Blood: methemoglobinemia
- Allergy

ADRs associated with the use of intravenous lidocaine are similar to the toxic effects of systemic exposure above. These are dose-related and more frequent at high infusion rates (≥3 mg/min). Common ADRs include headache, dizziness, drowsiness, confusion, visual disturbances, tinnitus, tremor, and/or paraesthesia. Infrequent ADRs associated with the use of lidocaine include: hypotension, bradycardia, arrhythmias, cardiac arrest, muscle twitching, seizures, coma, and/or respiratory depression.

It is generally safe to use lidocaine with vasoconstrictors such as adrenaline, including in regions such as the nose, ears, fingers, and toes. While concerns of tissue death, if used in these areas, have been raised, the evidence does not support these concerns.

The use of lidocaine for spinal anesthesia may lead to an increased risk of transient neurological symptoms, a painful condition that is sometimes experienced immediately after surgery. There is some weak evidence to suggest that the use of alternative anesthetic medications such as prilocaine, procaine, bupivacaine, ropivacaine, or levobupivacaine may decrease the risk of a person developing transient neurological symptoms. Low-quality evidence suggests that 2‐chloroprocaine and mepivacaine when used for spinal anesthetic have a similar risk of the person developing transient neurological symptoms as lidocaine.

=== Interactions ===
Any drugs that are also ligands of CYP3A4 and CYP1A2 can potentially increase serum levels and potential for toxicity or decrease serum levels and the efficacy, depending on whether they induce or inhibit the enzymes, respectively. Drugs that may increase the chance of methemoglobinemia should also be considered carefully. Dronedarone and liposomal morphine are both absolutely a contraindication, as they may increase the serum levels, but hundreds of other drugs require monitoring for interaction.

=== Contraindications ===
Absolute contraindications for the use of lidocaine include:

- Heart block, second or third degree (without pacemaker)
- Severe sinoatrial block (without pacemaker)
- Serious adverse drug reaction to lidocaine or amide local anesthetics
- Hypersensitivity to corn and corn-related products (corn-derived dextrose is used in the mixed injections)
- Concurrent treatment with quinidine, flecainide, disopyramide, procainamide (class I antiarrhythmic agents)
- Prior use of amiodarone hydrochloride
- Adams–Stokes syndrome
- Wolff–Parkinson–White syndrome
- Lidocaine viscous is not recommended by the FDA to treat teething pain in children and infants.

Exercise caution in people with any of these:

- Hypotension not due to arrhythmia
- Bradycardia
- Accelerated idioventricular rhythm
- Elderly
- Ehlers–Danlos syndromes; efficiency of local anesthetics can be reduced
- Pseudocholinesterase deficiency
- Intra-articular infusion (this is not an approved indication and can cause chondrolysis)
- Porphyria, especially acute intermittent porphyria; lidocaine has been classified as porphyrogenic because of the hepatic enzymes it induces, although clinical evidence suggests it is not. Bupivacaine is a safe alternative in this case.
- Impaired liver function – people with lowered hepatic function may have an adverse reaction with repeated administration of lidocaine because the drug is metabolized by the liver. Adverse reactions may include neurological symptoms (e.g. dizziness, nausea, muscle twitches, vomiting, or seizures).

=== Overdosage ===
Overdoses of lidocaine may result from excessive administration by topical or parenteral routes, accidental oral ingestion of topical preparations by children (who are more susceptible to overdose), accidental intravenous (rather than subcutaneous, intrathecal, or paracervical) injection, or from prolonged use of subcutaneous infiltration anesthesia during cosmetic surgery. The maximum safe dose is 3 mg per kg.

Such overdoses have often led to severe toxicity or death in both children and adults (local anesthetic systemic toxicity). Symptoms include central nervous system manifestations such as numbness of the tongue, dizziness, tinnitus, visual disturbances, convulsions, reduced consciousness progressing to coma, as well as respiratory arrest and cardiovascular disturbances. Lidocaine and its two major metabolites may be quantified in blood, plasma, or serum to confirm the diagnosis in potential poisoning victims or to assist forensic investigation in a case of fatal overdose.

Lidocaine is often given intravenously as an antiarrhythmic agent in critical cardiac-care situations. Treatment with intravenous lipid emulsions (used for parenteral feeding) to reverse the effects of local anaesthetic toxicity is becoming more common.

Lidocaine has been used by veterinarians for euthanasia of horses, livestock, and more recently of dogs and cats. Due to its side effects, intravenous lidocaine can be given only to anesthetized patients, making it less attractive perhaps than pentobarbital, which can be given intravenously to awake patients. In 2025 Russian Army nurses have reported the use of 1-2 % intravenous lidocaine in 60 mL dosage for mercy killing of mortally wounded servicemen.

=== Postarthroscopic glenohumeral chondrolysis ===
Lidocaine in large amounts may be toxic to cartilage and intra-articular infusions can lead to postarthroscopic glenohumeral chondrolysis.

== Pharmacology ==
=== Mechanism of action ===
Lidocaine alters signal conduction in neurons by prolonging the inactivation of the fast voltage-gated Na^{+} channels in the neuronal cell membrane responsible for action potential propagation. With sufficient blockage, the voltage-gated sodium channels will not open and an action potential will not be generated. Careful titration allows for a high degree of selectivity in the blockage of sensory neurons, whereas higher concentrations also affect other types of neurons.

The same principle applies to this drug's actions in the heart. Blocking sodium channels in the conduction system, as well as the muscle cells of the heart, raises the depolarization threshold, making the heart less likely to initiate or conduct early action potentials that may cause an arrhythmia.

=== Pharmacokinetics ===
When used as an injectable it typically begins working within four minutes and lasts for half an hour to three hours. Lidocaine is about 95% metabolized (dealkylated) in the liver mainly by CYP3A4 to the pharmacologically active metabolites monoethylglycinexylidide (MEGX) and then subsequently to the inactive glycine xylidide (GX). MEGX has a longer half-life than lidocaine, but also is a less potent sodium channel blocker. The volume of distribution is 1.1 L/kg to 2.1 L/kg, but congestive heart failure can decrease it. About 60% to 80% circulates bound to the protein alpha_{1} acid glycoprotein. The oral bioavailability is 35% and the topical bioavailability is 3%. Lidocaine efficacy may be reduced in tissues that are inflamed, due to competing inflammatory mediators.

The elimination half-life of lidocaine is biphasic and around 90 min to 120 min in most people. This may be prolonged in people with hepatic impairment (average 343 min) or congestive heart failure (average 136 min). Lidocaine is excreted in the urine (90% as metabolites and 10% as unchanged drug).

== Chemistry ==
=== Synthesis ===
Lidocaine may be synthesised from 2,6-xylidine and chloroacetyl chloride:

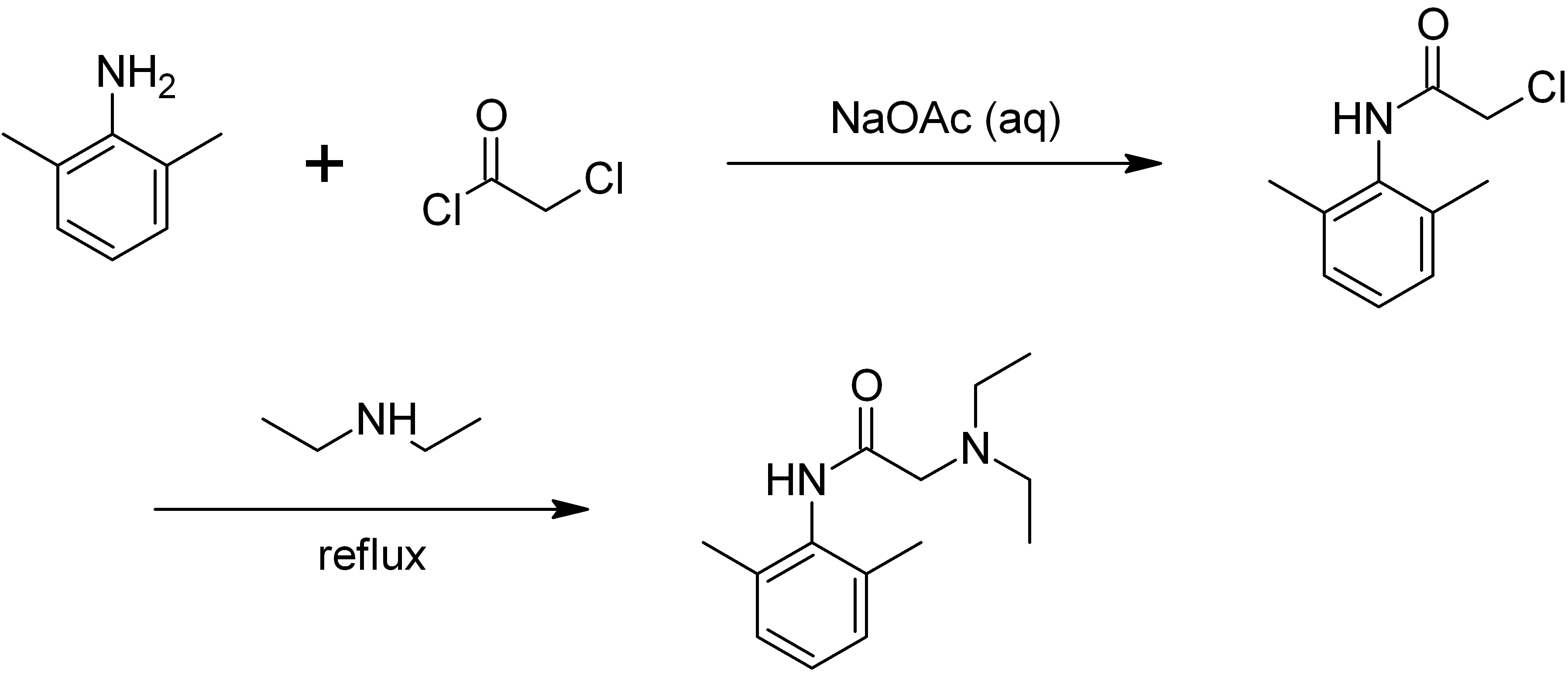

=== Molecular structure and conformational flexibility ===
Lidocaine's 1,5-dimethylbenzene group gives it hydrophobic properties. In addition to this aromatic unit, lidocaine has an aliphatic section comprising amide, carbonyl, and enyl groups.

Lidocaine exhibits a remarkable degree of conformational flexibility, resulting in more than 60 probable conformers. This adaptability arises from the high lability of the amide and ethyl groups within the molecule. These groups can undergo shifts in their positions, leading to significant variations in the overall molecular configuration.

=== Influence of temperature and pressure on conformational preference ===
The dynamic transformation of lidocaine conformers in supercritical carbon dioxide (scCO_{2}) highly depends on external factors such as pressure and temperature. Alterations in these conditions can lead to distinct conformations, impacting the molecule's physicochemical properties. One notable consequence of these variations is the particle size of lidocaine when produced through micronization using scCO_{2}. Changes in the position of the amide group within the molecule can trigger a redistribution of intra- and intermolecular hydrogen bonds, affecting the outcome of the micronization process and the resultant particle size.

== Veterinary use ==
Lidocaine is commonly used in veterinary medicine in both companion and production animals around the world and is listed as an essential veterinary medicine by the World Veterinary Association and also the World Small Animal Veterinary Association.

In veterinary medicine, it is commonly used as a local anaesthetic both as an injectable or topical product. It provides excellent local anaesthesia when given by local infiltration into a tissue or via specific nerve blocks. These are commonly applied to nerves of the head, limbs, thorax, and spine. It can also be used to treat ventricular arrhythmias when given intravenously. In most veterinary species, when given via injection, it has a rapid onset of action (2-10 minutes) with a duration of action of 30-60 minutes.

In veterinary species, its metabolism is much the same as humans with rapid metabolism in the liver to the major metabolites MEGX (monoethylglycine xylidide) and GX (glycine xylidide) that retain partial activity against sodium channels. These compounds are further metabolized to monoethylglycine and xylidide, respectively.

Toxicity in animals is similar to that seen in humans with both toxicity to the central nervous system (CNS) and cardiovascular system observed. General the CNS signs are seen first with agitation and muscle twitching seen before the cardiovascular signs of hypotension, myocardial depression, and arrhythmias. Further CNS depression will result from higher doses with seizures and convulsions and eventually apnea and death.

It is a component of the veterinary drug Tributame along with embutramide and chloroquine used to carry out euthanasia on horses and dogs.

== History ==
Lidocaine, the first amino amide–type local anesthetic (previous were amino esters), was first synthesized under the name 'xylocaine' by the team of chemist Nils Löfgren in 1943. Inga Fischer is credited for being the first to synthesize it at large-scale in the laboratory. Bengt Lundqvist performed the first injection anesthesia experiments on himself. It was first marketed in 1948 by Astra.

== Society and culture ==
=== Dosage forms ===
Lidocaine, usually in the form of its hydrochloride salt, is available in various forms including many topical formulations and solutions for injection or infusion. It is also available as a transdermal patch, which is applied directly to the skin.

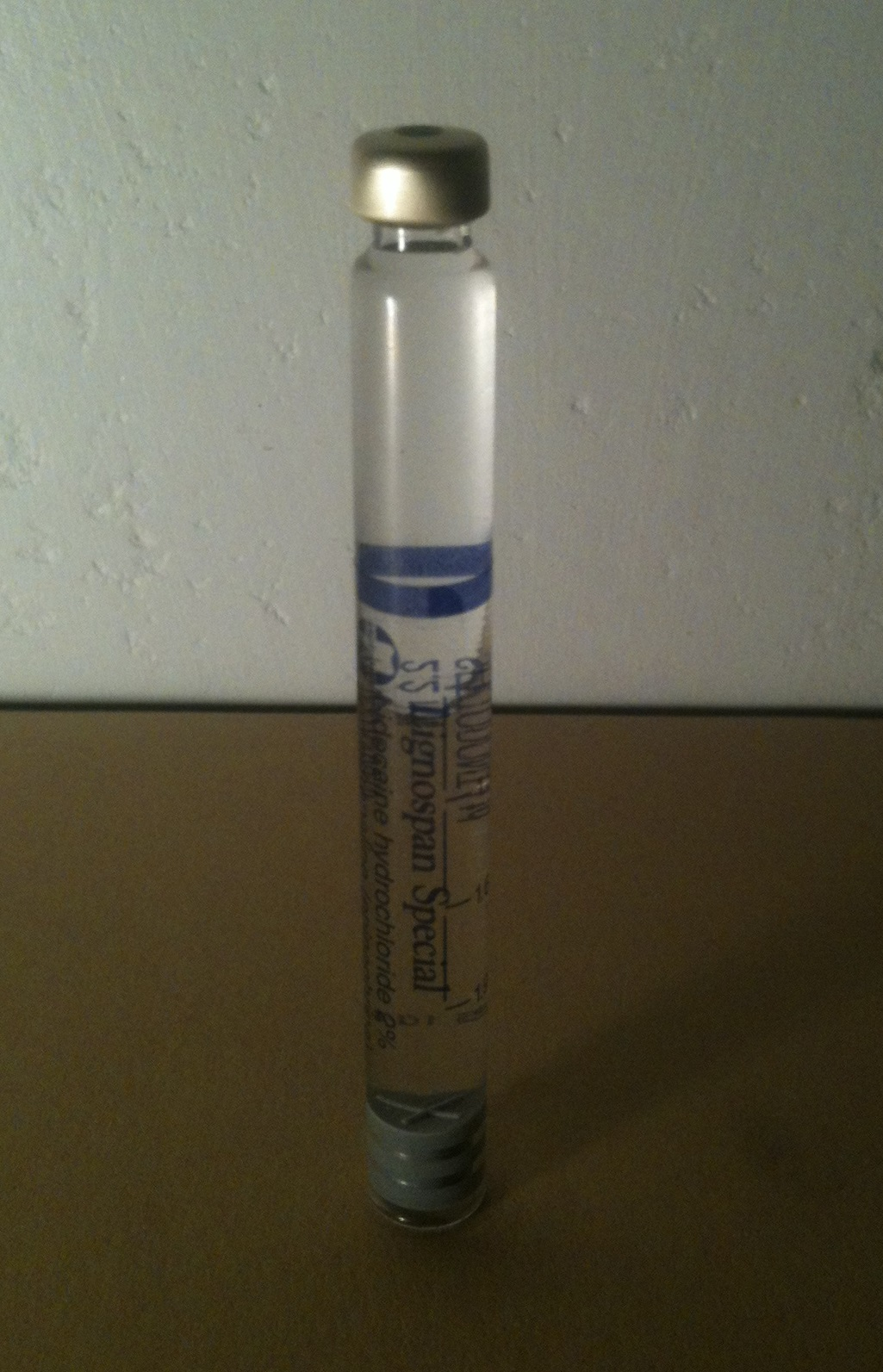
Lidocaine hydrochloride 2% epinephrine 1:80,000 solution for injection in a cartridge

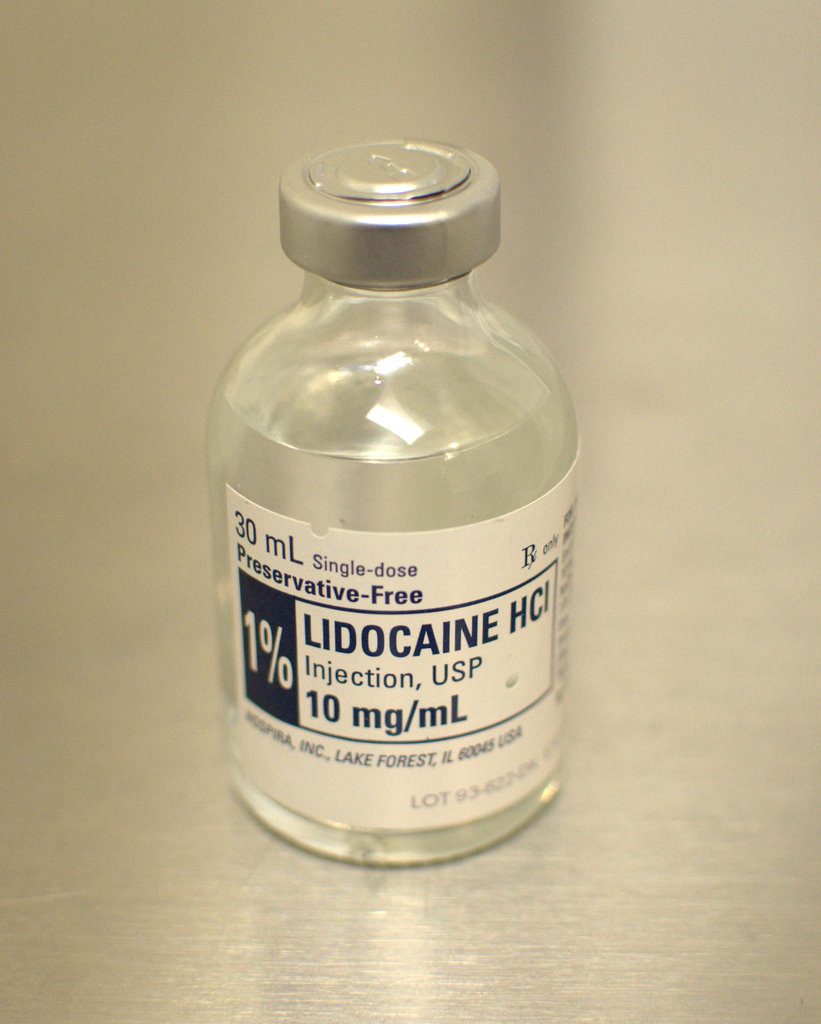
Lidocaine hydrochloride 1% solution for injection

Topical lidocaine spray

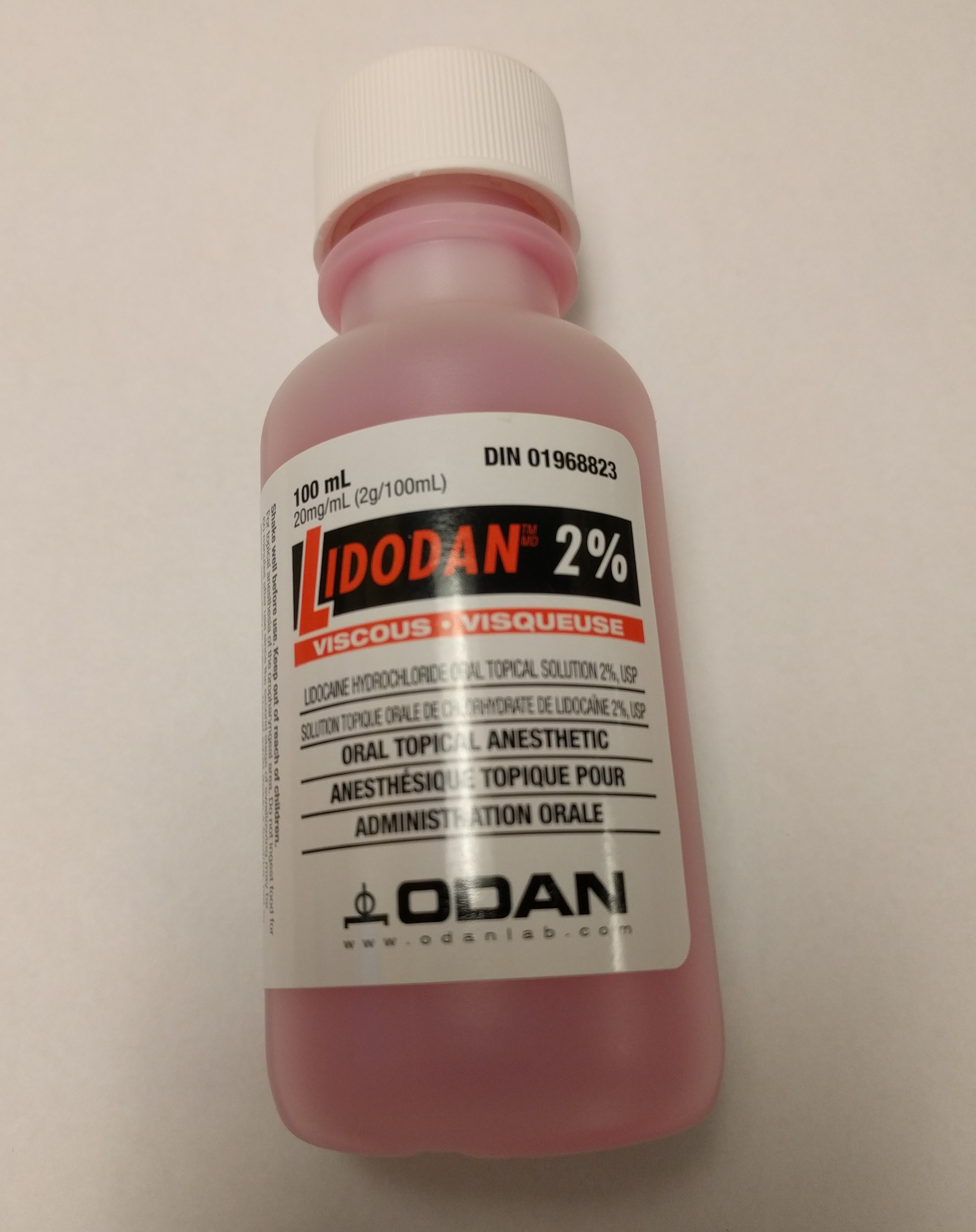
2% viscous lidocaine

=== Names ===
Lidocaine is the International Nonproprietary Name (INN), British Approved Name (BAN), and Australian Approved Name (AAN), while lignocaine is the former BAN and AAN. Both the old and new names will be displayed on the product label in Australia until at least 2023.

Xylocaine is a brand name, referring to the major synthetic building block 2,6-xylidine. The "ligno" prefix is chosen because "xylo" means wood in Greek while "ligno" means the same in Latin. The "lido" prefix instead refers to the fact that the drug is chemically related to acetanilide.

=== Recreational use ===
As of 2021, lidocaine is not listed by the World Anti-Doping Agency as a substance whose use is banned in sport. It is used as an adjuvant, adulterant, and diluent to street drugs such as cocaine and heroin. It is one of the three common ingredients in site enhancement oil used by bodybuilders.

=== Adulterant in cocaine ===
Lidocaine is often added to cocaine as a diluent. Cocaine and lidocaine both numb the gums when applied. This gives the user the impression of high-quality cocaine when in actuality the user is receiving a diluted product.

=== Compendial status ===
- Japanese Pharmacopoeia 15
- United States Pharmacopeia 31
