= Site enhancement oil =

Oil used in bodybuilding

Site enhancement oil: compounds injected into muscles to increase their size. Synthol is injected into muscles to create larger bulges, or injecting Poly(methyl methacrylate) (PMMA) into muscles to shape them. Use of PMMA to shape muscles is prohibited in the United States. However, it is not illegal to use synthol.

Site enhancement oil, often called santol or synthol (no relation to the Synthol mouthwash brand), refers to oils injected into muscles to increase the size or change the shape. Some bodybuilders, particularly at the professional level, inject their muscles with such mixtures to mimic the appearance of developed muscle where it may otherwise be disproportionate or lacking. This is known as "fluffing". Synthol is 85% oil, 7.5% lidocaine, and 7.5% alcohol. It is not restricted, and many brands are available on the Internet. The use of injected oil to enhance muscle appearance is common among bodybuilders, despite the fact that synthol can cause pulmonary embolisms, nerve damage, infections, sclerosing lipogranuloma, stroke, and the formation of oil-filled granulomas, cysts or ulcers in the muscle. Rare cases might require surgical intervention to avoid further damage to the muscle and/or to prevent loss of life.

Sesame oil is often used in such mixtures, which can cause allergic reactions such as vasculitis.

As the injected muscle is not actually well-developed, it might droop under gravity.
