= August Bier =

German surgeon (1861–1949)

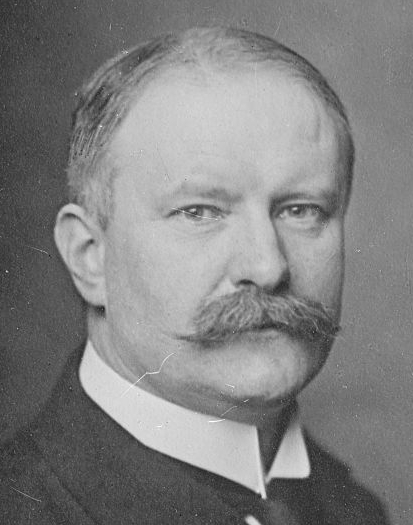
- August Bier
- Born: 24 November 1861; Bad Arolsen, Principality of Waldeck and Pyrmont
- Died: 12 March 1949 (aged 87); Sauen, Brandenburg, Germany
- Citizenship: German
- Known for: spinal anesthesia, intravenous regional anesthesia
- Spouse: Anna
- Awards: Cameron Prize for Therapeutics of the University of Edinburgh (1910); Geheimrat; Eagle Shield of the German Reich (1936); German National Prize for Art and Science (1938)
- Scientific career
- Fields: surgery, anesthesiology
- Institutions: University of Greifswald, University of Bonn, Charité – Universitätsmedizin

August Karl Gustav Bier (24 November 1861 – 12 March 1949) was a German surgeon. He was the first to perform spinal anesthesia and intravenous regional anesthesia.

== Early medical career ==
Bier began his medical education at the Charité – Universitätsmedizin Berlin in 1881, transferred to the Leipzig University in 1882, and transferred again to the University of Kiel in 1883. After receiving his medical degree from the University of Kiel in 1886, Bier worked as a general practitioner and ship's surgeon just outside the city of Kiel – which is a major port on the Baltic Sea. Bier began his residency in 1888 at the surgical clinic at the University of Kiel, under the mentorship of Friedrich von Esmarch. After professorships in Greifswald and Bonn, Bier was appointed Chief Surgeon and Geheimrat Professor of Surgery at the Charité - Universitätsmedizin.

== Spinal anesthesia ==
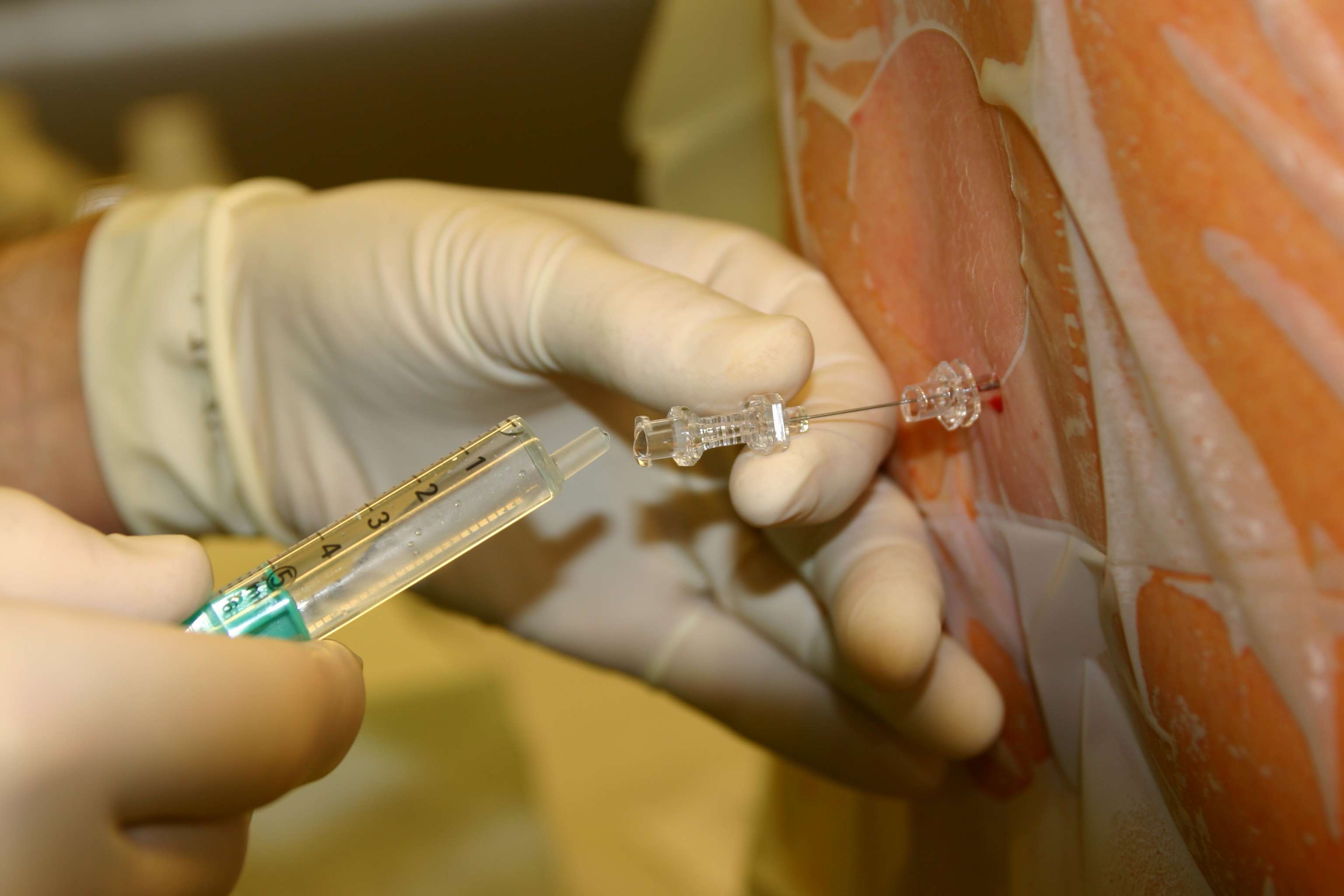
Cerebrospinal fluid flowing through a 25 gauge spinal needle during spinal anesthesia

On 16 August 1898, Bier performed the first operation under spinal anesthesia at the Royal Surgical Hospital of the University of Kiel. The patient was scheduled to undergo segmental resection of his left ankle, which was severely infected with tuberculosis, but he dreaded the prospect of general anesthesia because he had suffered severe adverse side effects during multiple previous operations. Therefore, Bier suggested "cocainization" of the spinal cord as an alternative to general anesthesia. Bier injected 15 mg of cocaine intrathecally, which was sufficient to allow him to perform the operation. The subject was fully conscious during the operation, but felt no pain. Two hours after the operation, the subject complained of nausea, vomiting, severe headache, and pain in his back and ankle. The vomiting, back and leg pain improved by the following day, but the headache was still present. Bier performed spinal anesthetics on five more subjects for lower extremity surgery, using a similar technique and achieving similar results.

After this series of six subjects, Bier was to receive a spinal anesthetic administered by his assistant, August Hildebrandt. Unfortunately, although Hildebrandt placed the spinal needle correctly, with cerebrospinal fluid flowing freely from it, the syringe was only then discovered to not fit into the hub of the needle. During the efforts to fit the syringe into the hub of the needle, a great deal of cerebrospinal fluid escaped, most of the cocaine to be injected was lost, and the spinal anesthetic was consequently a complete failure. Later that same evening, Bier performed a cocaine spinal anesthetic on Hildebrandt. After the injection, Hildebrandt was temporarily unable to move or feel any sensation in his legs. The profound anesthesia of his legs was demonstrated using increasingly painful stimuli, including a needle inserted down to the femur, a blow with an iron hammer to the shins, forceful avulsion of pubic hair, and "strong pressure and traction" to the testicles. Later that evening, they celebrated their success with wine and cigars. Like all of Bier's previous experimental subjects, Bier and Hildebrandt both experienced severe post-spinal headaches. Hildebrandt's symptoms lasted about four days, while Bier remained confined to bed for nine days.

== Intravenous regional anesthesia ==
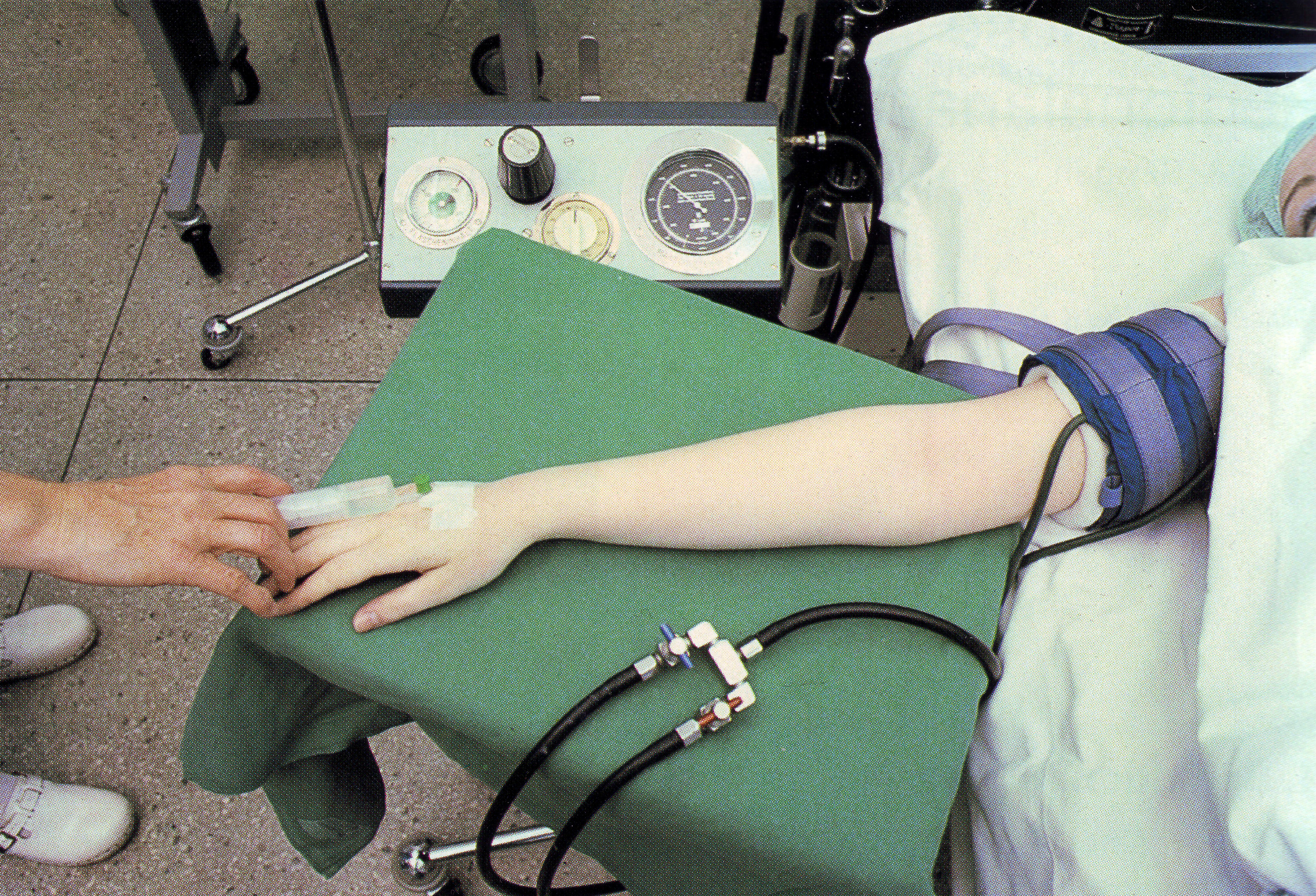
Intravenous regional anesthesia

In 1908, Bier pioneered the use of intravenous regional anesthesia, a technique which is commonly referred to as a "Bier block". This technique is frequently used for operations of brief duration upon the hand, wrist, and forearm. It can also be used for operations of brief duration upon the foot, ankle, and leg.

== Charité – Universitätsmedizin Berlin ==
In 1903 he joined the faculty of the University of Bonn as a full professor, where he taught until 1907. Then he went to Berlin, where he was appointed Geheimrat Professor of Surgery and Chief Surgeon at the Charité – Universitätsmedizin. Bier was elected President of the German Surgical Society in 1911. Bier treated many important people, such as Kaiser Wilhelm II, family members of Nicholas II of Russia, and Vladimir Lenin.

Although he was arguably the most accomplished surgeon of his time, not all of his operations were successful. Hugo Stinnes (a business magnate and politician who was among the wealthiest men in the world at that time) died on 10 April 1924, about a month after Bier performed a cholecystectomy on him. On 24 February 1925, Bier performed an appendectomy on Friedrich Ebert, the first President of Germany, who had signed the Weimar Constitution into law in 1919. Ebert, who had suffered from appendicitis for two weeks before it was diagnosed, died of septic shock four days after the operation.

Bier was Chief Surgeon at the Charité in Berlin until 1928, when Ferdinand Sauerbruch (1875–1951) assumed the position. Bier remained at the Charité as Professor Emeritus until his retirement in 1932.

== Sports medicine ==
Bier is also considered to be a pioneer in the field of sports medicine, having played a pivotal role in establishing it as a discipline. Along with Arthur Mallwitz (1880–1968), Bier organized the first lectures in sports medicine at the University of Berlin in 1919. Bier served as director of the Deutsche Hochschule für Leibesübungen ("German University of Physical Education") in Berlin from its founding in 1920 until 1932. Sauerbruch temporarily headed the academy until 1933, when Karl Gebhardt (1897–1948) assumed the directorship. Gebhardt became the first professor of sports medicine in Berlin. Gebhardt expanded on Bier's methods, adopting an academic approach to sports medicine and awarding degrees.

== Awards ==
In 1910, Bier was awarded the Cameron Prize for Therapeutics of the University of Edinburgh. The title of Geheimrat was bestowed upon Bier by German Emperor Wilhelm II. On 24 November 1936, Bier received the Eagle Shield of the German Reich. On 30 January 1938, Bier became one of only nine people to ever receive the German National Prize for Art and Science, an award created by Adolf Hitler that year as a replacement for the Nobel Prize, which he had forbidden Germans to accept.

== Death ==
Bier's wife Anna died in 1947. In January 1949, he suffered from apoplexy and later died in Soviet-occupied Sauen in March 1949 after contracting influenza and pneumonia. He was 87. They were buried in a forest on their estate.

== See also ==
- History of neuraxial anesthesia
