= Arthroscopy =

Examination of a joint via small surgical incision

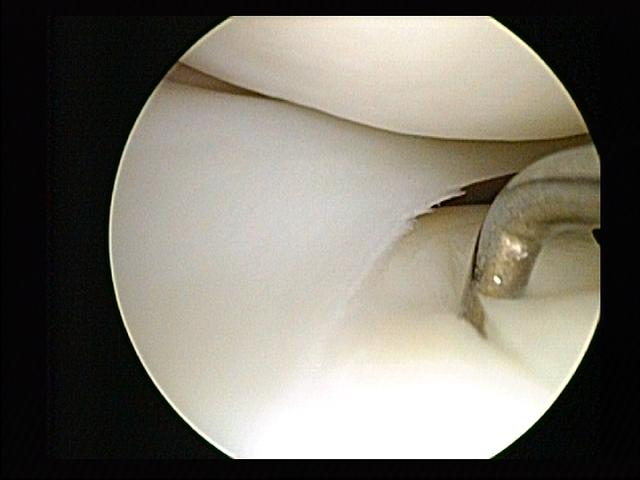
- Lateral meniscus located between thigh bone (femur, above) and shin bone (tibia, below). The tibial cartilage displays a fissure (tip of teaser instrument).
- ICD-9-CM: 80.2
- MeSH: D001182
- OPS-301 code: 1-697
- MedlinePlus: 007471

Arthroscopy (also called arthroscopic or keyhole surgery) is a minimally invasive surgical procedure on a joint in which an examination and sometimes treatment of damage is performed using an arthroscope, an endoscope that is inserted into the joint through a small incision. Arthroscopic procedures can be performed during ACL reconstruction.

The advantage over traditional open surgery is that the joint does not have to be opened up fully. For knee arthroscopy only two small incisions are made, one for the arthroscope and one for the surgical instruments to be used in the knee cavity. This reduces recovery time and may increase the rate of success due to less trauma to the connective tissue. It has gained popularity due to evidence of faster recovery times with less scarring, because of the smaller incisions. Irrigation fluid (most commonly 'normal' saline) is used to distend the joint and make a surgical space.

The surgical instruments are smaller than traditional instruments. Surgeons view the joint area on a video monitor, and can diagnose and repair torn joint tissue, such as ligaments. It is technically possible to do an arthroscopic examination of almost every joint, but is most commonly used for the knee, shoulder, elbow, wrist, ankle, foot, and hip.

== Types ==
=== Knee ===
Knee arthroscopy, or arthroscopic knee surgery, is a surgery that uses arthroscopic techniques.

It has, in many cases, replaced the classic open surgery (arthrotomy) that was performed in the past. Arthroscopic knee surgery is one of the most common orthopaedic procedures, performed approximately 2 million times worldwide each year. The procedures are more commonly performed to treat meniscus injury and to perform anterior cruciate ligament reconstruction.

While knee arthroscopy is commonly used for partial meniscectomy (trimming a torn meniscus) on middle aged to older adults with knee pain, the claimed positive results seem to lack scientific evidence. Many studies have shown the outcomes from knee arthroscopic surgery for osteoarthritis and degenerative meniscal tears are no better than the outcomes from placebo (fake) surgery or other treatments (such as exercise therapy).

During an average knee arthroscopy, a small fiberoptic camera (the arthroscope) is inserted into the joint through a small incision, about 4 mm (1/8 inch) width. More incisions might be performed in order to visually check other parts of the knee and to insert the miniature instruments that are used to perform surgical procedures.

==== Knee osteoarthritis ====
The BMJ Rapid Recommendations group makes a strong recommendation against arthroscopy for osteoarthritis on the basis that there is high quality evidence that there is no lasting benefit and less than 15% of people have a small short-term benefit. There are rare but serious adverse effects that can occur, including venous thromboembolism, infections, and nerve damage. The BMJ Rapid Recommendation includes infographics and shared decision-making tools to facilitate a conversation between doctors and patients about the risks and benefits of arthroscopic surgery.

Two major trials of arthroscopic surgery for osteoarthritis of the knee found no benefit for these surgeries. Even though randomized control trials have demonstrated this to be a procedure which involves the risks of surgery with questionable or no demonstrable long-term benefit, insurance companies (government and private) world-wide have generally felt obliged to continue funding it. An exception is Germany, where funding has been removed for the indication of knee osteoarthritis. It is claimed that German surgeons have continued to perform knee arthroscopy and instead claim rebates on the basis of a sub-diagnosis, such as meniscal tear.

A 2017 meta-analysis confirmed that there is only a very small and usually unimportant reduction in pain and improvement in function at 3 months (e.g. an average pain reduction of approximately 5 on a scale from 0 to 100). A separate review found that most people would consider a reduction in pain of approximately 12 on the same 0 to 100 scale important—suggesting that for most people, the pain reduction at 3 months is not important. Arthroscopy did not reduce pain or improve function or quality of life at one year. There are important adverse effects.

==== Meniscal tears ====
One of the primary reasons for performing arthroscopies is to repair or trim a painful and torn or damaged meniscus. The technical terms for the surgery is arthroscopic partial meniscectomy (APM). Arthroscopic surgery, however, does not appear to result in benefits to adults when performed for knee pain in patients with osteoarthritis who have a meniscal tear. This may be due to the fact that a torn meniscus may often not cause pain and symptoms, which may be caused by the osteoarthritis alone. Some groups have made a strong recommendation against arthroscopic partial meniscectomy in nearly all patients, stating that the only group of patients who may—or may not—benefit are those with a true locked knee. Professional knee societies, however, highlight other symptoms and related factors they believe are important, and continue to support limited use of arthroscopic partial meniscectomy in carefully selected patients.

=== Hip ===
Hip arthroscopy was initially used for the diagnosis of unexplained hip pain, but is now widely used in the treatment of conditions both in and outside the hip joint. The most common indication currently is for the treatment of femoroacetabular impingement (FAI) and its associated pathologies. Hip conditions that may be treated arthroscopically also includes labral tears, loose / foreign body removal, hip washout (for infection) or biopsy, chondral (cartilage) lesions, osteochondritis dissecans, ligamentum teres injuries (and reconstruction), Iliopsoas tendinopathy (or 'snapping psoas'), trochanteric pain syndrome, snapping iliotibial band, osteoarthritis (controversial), sciatic nerve compression (piriformis syndrome), ischiofemoral impingement and direct assessment of hip replacement.

Hip arthroscopy is a widely adopted treatment for a range of conditions, including labral tears, femoroacetabular impingement, osteochondritis dissecans.

=== Shoulder ===
Arthroscopy is commonly used for treatment of diseases of the shoulder including subacromial impingement, acromioclavicular osteoarthritis, rotator cuff tears, frozen shoulder (adhesive capsulitis), chronic tendonitis, removal of loose bodies and partial tears of the long biceps tendon, SLAP lesions and shoulder instability. The most common indications include subacromial decompression, bankarts lesion repair and rotator cuff repair. All these procedures were done by opening the joint through big incisions before the advent of arthroscopy. Arthroscopic shoulder surgeries have gained momentum in the past decade. "Keyhole surgery" of the shoulder as it is popularly known has reduced inpatient time and rehabilitation requirements and is often a daycare procedure.

=== Wrist ===
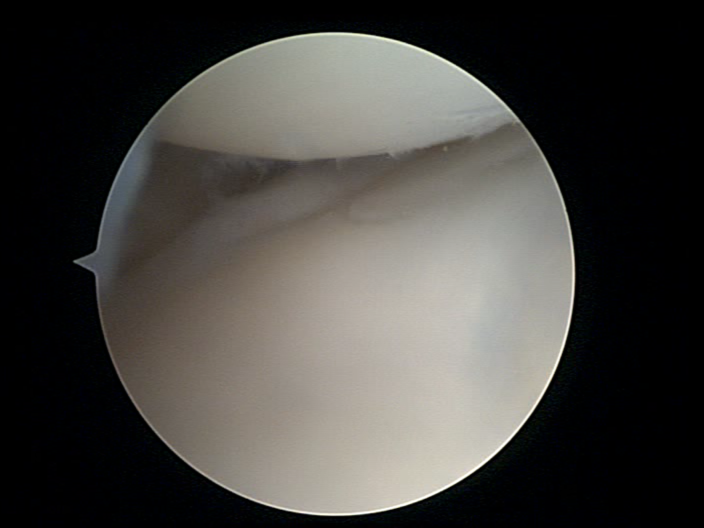
Arthroscopic view showing two of the wrist bones

Arthroscopy of the wrist is used to investigate and treat symptoms of repetitive strain injury, fractures of the wrist and torn or damaged ligaments. It can also be used to ascertain joint damage caused by wrist osteoarthritis.

=== Spine ===
Many invasive spine procedures involve the removal of bone, muscle, and ligaments to access and treat problematic areas. In some cases, thoracic (mid-spine) conditions require a surgeon to access the problem area through the rib cage, dramatically lengthening recovery time.

Arthroscopic procedures (also endoscopic spinal procedures) allow access to and treatment of spinal conditions with minimal damage to surrounding tissues. Recovery times are greatly reduced due to the relatively small size of incisions, and many patients are treated as outpatients. Recovery rates and times vary according to condition severity and the patient's overall health.

Arthroscopic procedures treat

- Spinal disc herniation and degenerative discs
- spinal deformity
- tumors
- general spine trauma

=== Temporomandibular joint ===
Arthroscopy of the temporomandibular joint is sometimes used as either a diagnostic procedure for symptoms and signs related to these joints, or as a therapeutic measure in conditions like temporomandibular joint dysfunction. TMJ arthroscopy can be a purely diagnostic procedure, or it can have its own beneficial effects which may result from washing out of the joint during the procedure, thought to remove debris and inflammatory mediators, and may enable a displaced disc to return to its correct position. Arthroscopy is also used to visualize the inside of the joint during certain surgical procedures involving the articular disc or the articular surfaces, similar to laparoscopy. Examples include release of adhesions (e.g., by blunt dissection or with a laser) or release of the disc. Biopsies or disc reduction can also be carried out during arthroscopy. It is carried out under general anesthetic.

== History ==
Professor Kenji Takagi in Tokyo has traditionally been credited with performing the first arthroscopic examination of a knee joint, in 1919. He used a 7.3 mm cystoscope for his first arthroscopies. The Danish physician Severin Nordentoft reported on arthroscopies of the knee joint in 1912 at the Proceedings of the 41st Congress of the German Society of Surgeons at Berlin. He called the procedure (in Latin) arthroscopia genu, and used sterile saline or boric acid solution as his optic media, and entering the joint by a portal on the outer border of the patella. It is not clear if these examinations were of deceased or of living patients.

Pioneering work began as early as the 1920s with the work of Eugen Bircher. He published several papers in the 1920s about his use of arthroscopy of the knee for diagnostic purposes. After diagnosing torn tissue, he used open surgery to remove or repair the damaged tissue. Initially, he used an electric Jacobaeus thoracolaparoscope for his diagnostic procedures, which produced a dim view of the joint. Later, he developed a double-contrast approach to improve visibility. He gave up endoscopy in 1930, and his work was largely neglected for several decades.

While he is often considered the inventor of arthroscopy of the knee, the Japanese surgeon Masaki Watanabe, MD, receives primary credit for using arthroscopy for interventional surgery. Watanabe was inspired by the work and teaching of Dr Richard O'Connor. Later, Dr. Heshmat Shahriaree began experimenting with ways to excise fragments of menisci.

The first operating arthroscope was designed by them, and they worked together to produce the first high-quality color intraarticular photography. The field benefited significantly from technological advances, particularly advances in flexible fiber optics during the 1970s and 1980s.

Canadian doctor Robert Jackson is credited with bringing the procedure to the Western world. In 1964, Jackson was in Tokyo completing a one-year fellowship and serving as a physician for the Canadian Olympic team. While there, he spent time at the clinic of Watanabe learning the thirty year old procedure that had only been used to investigate arthritis in the elderly. Jackson returned to Toronto where he continued to practice the technique, eventually becoming "the world's foremost expert on arthroscopy".

According to Sports Illustrated, "Jackson's particular genius was to recognize a wider application for the procedure than Watanabe ever did." Jackson realized the technique could be used for young, athletic patients that had suffered injuries. Torn knee cartilage or ligaments previously would require an arthrotomy procedure and might mean a year or more of rehab or the end of a career. Jackson believed the less invasive procedure with its smaller incisions would be able to save the career of injured athletes. While many were skeptical at first, Jackson's efforts to develop, teach and popularize the procedure helped to prolong the careers of athletes such as Bobby Orr, Willis Reed, Joan Benoit and Mary Lou Retton. For this, Jackson was named one of Sports Illustrated's forty most impactful people in sport's history, coming in at #37, and the only doctor on the list.

== Complications ==
Arthroscopy is considered a low-risk procedure with very low rates of serious complications. Commonly, irrigation fluid may leak (extravasates) into the surrounding soft tissue, causing edema which is generally a temporary phenomenon, taking anywhere from 7–15 days to completely settle. Rarely, this fluid may be the cause of a serious complication, compartment syndrome. However, postarthroscopic glenohumeral chondrolysis (PAGCL) is a rare complication of arthroscopic surgery and involves chondrolysis wherein the articular cartilage of the shoulder undergoes rapid, degenerative changes shortly after arthroscopic surgery.

== See also ==
- Arthroscopy: The Journal of Arthroscopic and Related Surgery
- Invasiveness of surgical procedures
- Laparoscopic surgery
