= Théodore Tronchin =

Physician from Geneva (1709–1781)

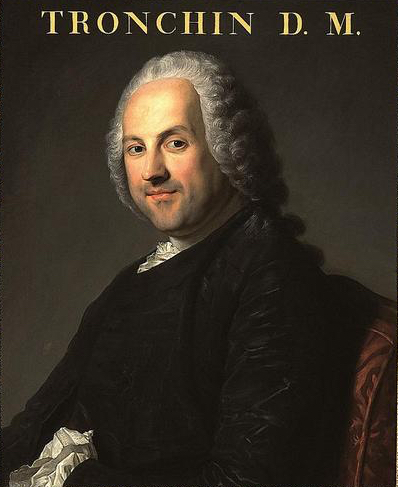
- Portrait of Doctor Théodore Tronchin (1709–1781), in Geneva by René Gaillard in 1785, from a work by Jean-Étienne Liotard
- Born: 24 May 1703; Geneva, Republic of Geneva
- Died: 30 November 1781 (aged 78); Paris, Kingdom of France
- Education: University of Cambridge
- Scientific career
- Fields: Medicine

Théodore Tronchin (24 May 1709 – 30 November 1781) was a physician from the Republic of Geneva.

== Life ==
A native of Geneva, he studied initially at the University of Cambridge, then transferred to the University of Leiden, where he was a pupil of Herman Boerhaave (1668–1738). In 1730 he obtained his medical doctorate, and subsequently practiced medicine in Amsterdam. In the early 1750s he returned to Geneva, where he received the title of Professor Emeritus of Medicine, and later moved to Paris, where he opened a medical practice in 1766.

Tronchin was an influential 18th-century physician, whose popularity spread amongst European royalty and the upper classes. Among his patients were Voltaire, Rousseau, and Diderot. In 1762 Tronchin was elected a Fellow of the Royal Society and in 1779 a foreign member of the Royal Swedish Academy of Sciences. Tronchin is mentioned in passing as a great physician in the Marquis de Sade's "Philosophy in the Bedroom".

== Views ==
He was a major proponent of inoculation for smallpox, and was responsible for the inoculation of several thousand patients in Switzerland, France and the Netherlands.

He was distrustful of traditional medical practices such as bloodletting and purging, and was an advocate of a simple and natural hygiene that stressed fresh air, diet and exercise. He was scornful of a sedentary lifestyle and excessive sleep, and dedicated several hours of the week to medical assistance for the poor.

== Works ==
Tronchin's written works were few, although he did publish a treatise titled "De colica pictonum", a work that explained the cause of Poitou colic due to lead poisoning. He also wrote part of the article "Innoculation" for Diderot's Encyclopédie (1751–1772).
