= Ropivacaine =

Local anaesthetic drug

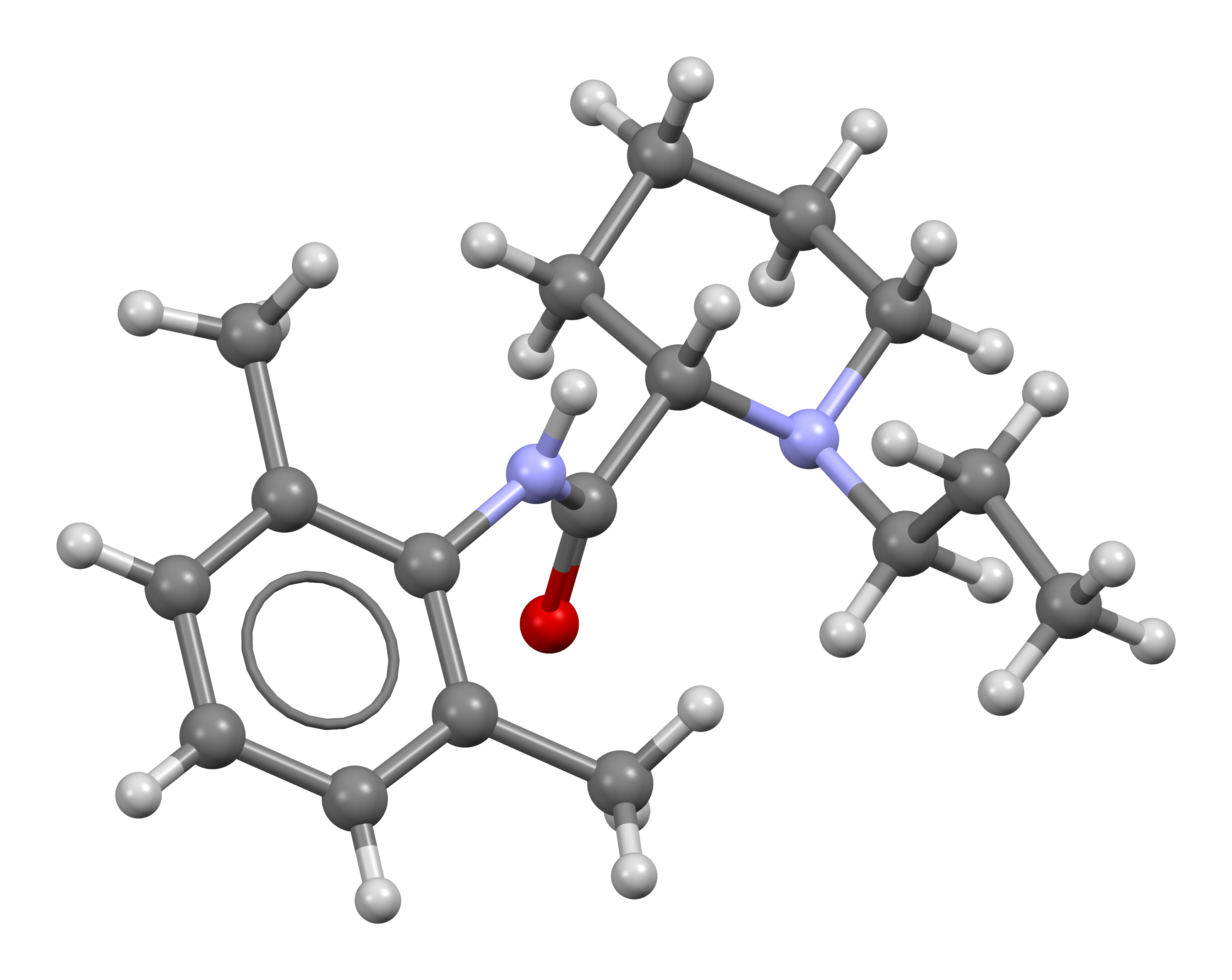

Clinical data
- Pronunciation: /roʊˈpɪvəkeɪn/
- Trade names: Naropin, Rocaine
- AHFS/Drugs.com: Monograph
- Pregnancy category: AU: B1
- Routes of administration: Parenteral
- ATC code: N01BB09 (WHO)

Legal status
- Legal status: AU: S4 (Prescription only); CA: ℞-only

Pharmacokinetic data
- Bioavailability: 87%–98% (epidural)
- Metabolism: Liver (CYP1A2-mediated)
- Elimination half-life: 1.6–6 hours (varies with administration route)
- Excretion: Kidney 86%

Identifiers
- IUPAC name: (S)-N-(2,6-dimethylphenyl)- 1-propylpiperidine-2-carboxamide
- CAS Number: 84057-95-4
- PubChem CID: 175805
- IUPHAR/BPS: 7602
- DrugBank: DB00296
- ChemSpider: 153165
- UNII: 7IO5LYA57N
- KEGG: D08490; as HCl: D04048
- ChEBI: CHEBI:8890
- ChEMBL: ChEMBL1077896
- CompTox Dashboard (EPA): DTXSID4040187
- ECHA InfoCard: 100.128.244

Chemical and physical data
- Formula: C_{17}H_{26}N_{2}O
- Molar mass: 274.408 g·mol^{−1}
- 3D model (JSmol): Interactive image
- Melting point: 144 to 146 °C (291 to 295 °F)
- SMILES: O=C(Nc1c(cccc1C)C)[C@H]2N(CCC)CCCC2
- InChI: InChI=1S/C17H26N2O/c1-4-11-19-12-6-5-10-15(19)17(20)18-16-13(2)8-7-9-14(16)3/h7-9,15H,4-6,10-12H2,1-3H3,(H,18,20)/t15-/m0/s1; Key:ZKMNUMMKYBVTFN-HNNXBMFYSA-N

Ropivacaine (rINN) is a local anaesthetic drug belonging to the amino amide group. The name ropivacaine refers to both the racemate and the marketed S-enantiomer. Ropivacaine hydrochloride is commonly marketed by AstraZeneca under the brand name Naropin.

== History ==
Ropivacaine was developed after bupivacaine was noted to be associated with cardiac arrest, particularly in pregnant women. Ropivacaine was found to have less cardiotoxicity than bupivacaine in animal models.

== Clinical use ==
=== Contraindications ===
Ropivacaine is contraindicated for intravenous regional anaesthesia (IVRA). However, new data suggested both ropivacaine (1.2-1.8 mg/kg in 40ml) and levobupivacaine (40 ml of 0.125% solution) can be used, because they have less cardiovascular and central nervous system toxicity than racemic bupivacaine.

=== Adverse effects ===
Adverse drug reactions (ADRs) are rare when it is administered correctly. Most ADRs relate to administration technique (resulting in systemic exposure) or pharmacological effects of anesthesia, however allergic reactions can rarely occur.

Systemic exposure to excessive quantities of ropivacaine mainly result in central nervous system (CNS) and cardiovascular effects – CNS effects usually occur at lower blood plasma concentrations and additional cardiovascular effects present at higher concentrations, though cardiovascular collapse may also occur with low concentrations. CNS effects may include CNS excitation (nervousness, tingling around the mouth, tinnitus, tremor, dizziness, blurred vision, seizures followed by depression (drowsiness, loss of consciousness), respiratory depression and apnea). Cardiovascular effects include hypotension, bradycardia, arrhythmias, and/or cardiac arrest – some of which may be due to hypoxemia secondary to respiratory depression.

=== Postarthroscopic glenohumeral chondrolysis ===
Ropivacaine is toxic to cartilage and their intra-articular infusions can lead to Postarthroscopic glenohumeral chondrolysis.

=== Treatment of overdose ===
As for bupivacaine, Celepid, a commonly available intravenous lipid emulsion, can be effective in treating severe cardiotoxicity secondary to local anaesthetic overdose in animal experiments and in humans in a process called lipid rescue.
