= Chondrolysis =

Process of breakdown of cartilage

Chondrolysis [ICD Code M94.3] is the process of breakdown of cartilage. It can occur as a result of trauma (traumatic chondrolysis). Intra-articular infusions of certain local anesthetic agents such as bupivacaine, lidocaine, ropivacaine and levobupivacaine can also lead to this effect.

== See also ==
- Chondritis
- Osteochondritis
- Relapsing polychondritis
