= Bupivacaine =

Local anaesthetic drug

- Molecular structure of bupivacaine

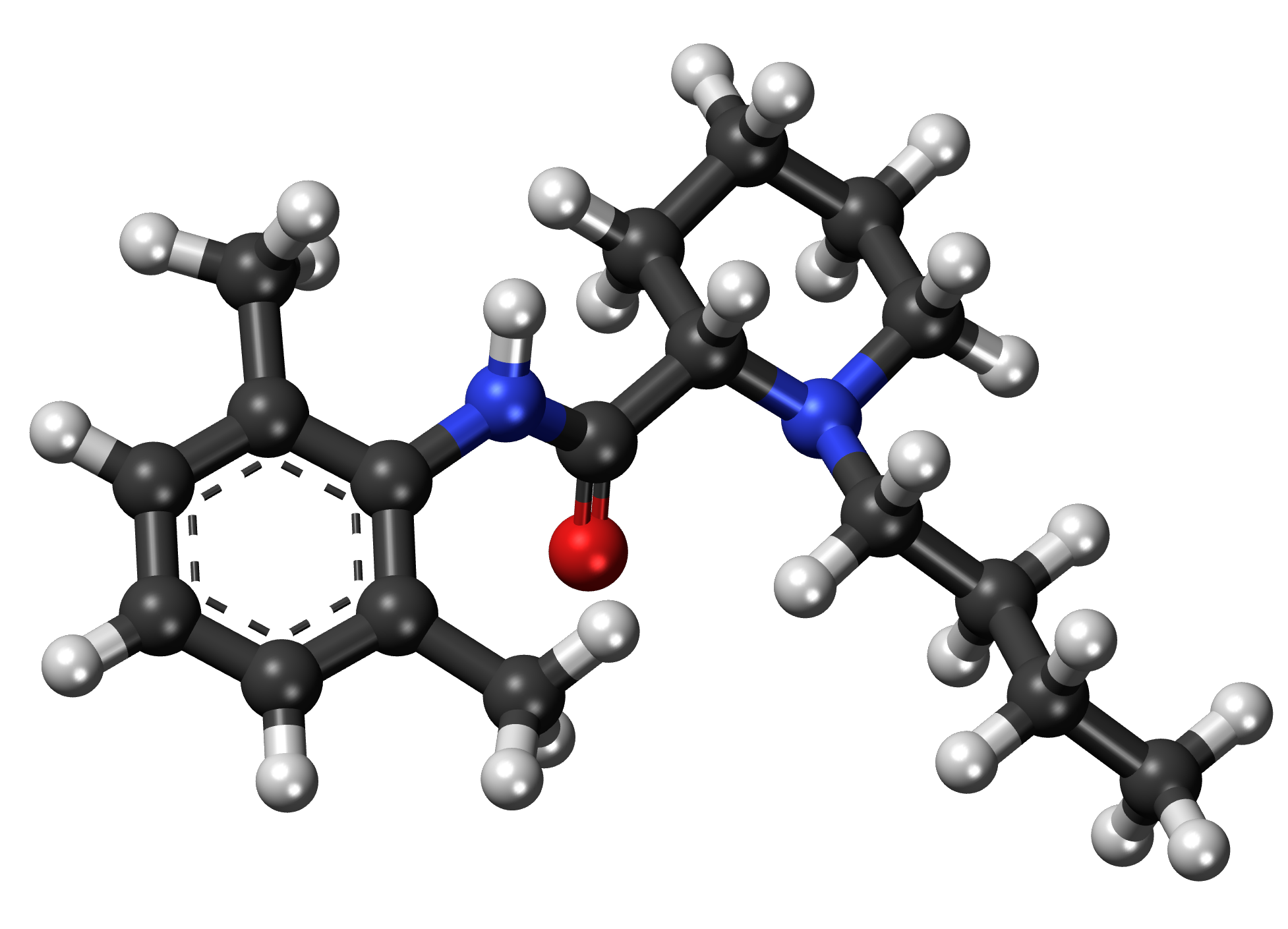
- 3D representation of the (S)-bupivacaine enantiomer (levobupivacaine)

Clinical data
- Pronunciation: /bjuːˈpɪvəkeɪn/
- Trade names: Marcaine, Sensorcaine, Posimir, others
- AHFS/Drugs.com: Monograph
- License data: US DailyMed: Bupivacaine
- Pregnancy category: AU: A
- Routes of administration: Parenteral, topical, implant
- ATC code: N01BB01 (WHO)

Legal status
- Legal status: AU: S4 (Prescription only); US: ℞-only; EU: Rx-only

Pharmacokinetic data
- Bioavailability: N/A
- Protein binding: 95%
- Metabolism: Liver
- Onset of action: Within 15 min
- Elimination half-life: 3.1 hours (adults); 8.1 hours (neonates)
- Duration of action: 2–8 hours
- Excretion: Kidney, 4–10%

Identifiers
- IUPAC name: (RS)-1-Butyl-N-(2,6-dimethylphenyl)piperidine-2-carboxamide
- CAS Number: 38396-39-3; HCl: 73360-54-0
- PubChem CID: 2474; HCl: 5282419
- IUPHAR/BPS: 2397
- DrugBank: DB00297
- ChemSpider: 2380; HCl: 58277
- UNII: Y8335394RO; HCl: 7TQO7W3VT8
- KEGG: D07552; HCl: D01450
- ChEBI: CHEBI:60789; HCl: CHEBI:31322
- ChEMBL: ChEMBL1098; HCl: ChEMBL1200396
- CompTox Dashboard (EPA): DTXSID2022703
- ECHA InfoCard: 100.048.993

Chemical and physical data
- Formula: C_{18}H_{28}N_{2}O
- Molar mass: 288.435 g·mol^{−1}
- 3D model (JSmol): Interactive image
- Melting point: 107 to 108 °C (225 to 226 °F)
- SMILES: O=C(C1N(CCCC1)CCCC)NC2=C(C)C=CC=C2C
- InChI: InChI=1S/C18H28N2O/c1-4-5-12-20-13-7-6-11-16(20)18(21)19-17-14(2)9-8-10-15(17)3/h8-10,16H,4-7,11-13H2,1-3H3,(H,19,21); Key:LEBVLXFERQHONN-UHFFFAOYSA-N

3D space-filling model of Bupivacaine under physiological conditions (pH 7.4) and in ALPB solvent model of wetoctanol

Bupivacaine, sold under the brand name Marcaine among others, is a medication used to decrease sensation in a specific small area. In nerve blocks, it is injected around a nerve that supplies the area, or into the spinal canal's epidural space. It is available mixed with a small amount of epinephrine to increase the duration of its action. It typically begins working within 15 minutes and lasts for 2 to 8 hours.

Possible side effects include sleepiness, muscle twitching, ringing in the ears, changes in vision, low blood pressure, and an irregular heart rate. Concerns exist that injecting it into a joint can cause problems with the cartilage. Concentrated bupivacaine is not recommended for epidural freezing. Epidural freezing may also increase the length of labor. It is a local anaesthetic of the amide group.

Bupivacaine was discovered in 1957. It is on the World Health Organization's List of Essential Medicines. Bupivacaine is available as a generic medication. An implantable formulation of bupivacaine (Xaracoll) was approved for medical use in the United States in August 2020.

== Medical uses ==
Bupivacaine is indicated for local infiltration, peripheral nerve block, sympathetic nerve block, and epidural and caudal blocks. It is sometimes used in combination with epinephrine to prevent systemic absorption and extend the duration of action. The 0.75% (most concentrated) formulation is used in retrobulbar block. It is the most commonly used local anesthetic in epidural anesthesia during labor, as well as in postoperative pain management. Liposomal formulations of bupivacaine (brand name EXPAREL) have not shown clinical benefit compared to plain bupivacaine when used in traditional perineural injections, although some industry-funded studies have suggested benefits when used in local infiltration.

The fixed-dose combination of bupivacaine with Type I collagen (brand name Xaracoll) is indicated for acute postsurgical analgesia (pain relief) for up to 24 hours in adults following open inguinal hernia repair.

Bupivacaine (Posimir) is indicated in adults for administration into the subacromial space under direct arthroscopic visualization to produce post-surgical analgesia for up to 72 hours following arthroscopic subacromial decompression.

== Contraindications ==
Bupivacaine is contraindicated in patients with known hypersensitivity reactions to bupivacaine or amino-amide anesthetics. It is also contraindicated in obstetrical paracervical blocks and intravenous regional anaesthesia (Bier block) because of potential risk of tourniquet failure and systemic absorption of the drug and subsequent cardiac arrest. The 0.75% formulation is contraindicated in epidural anesthesia during labor because of the association with refractory cardiac arrest.

== Adverse effects ==
Compared to other local anaesthetics, bupivacaine is markedly cardiotoxic. However, adverse drug reactions are rare when it is administered correctly. Most reactions are caused by accelerated absorption from the injection site, unintentional intravascular injection, or slow metabolic degradation. However, allergic reactions can rarely occur.

Clinically significant adverse events result from systemic absorption of bupivacaine and primarily involve the central nervous and cardiovascular systems. Effects on the central nervous system typically occur at lower blood plasma concentrations. Initially, cortical inhibitory pathways are selectively inhibited, causing symptoms of neuronal excitation. At higher plasma concentrations, both inhibitory and excitatory pathways are inhibited, causing central nervous system depression and potentially coma. Higher plasma concentrations also lead to cardiovascular effects, though cardiovascular collapse may also occur with low concentrations. Adverse effects on the central nervous system may indicate impending cardiotoxicity and should be carefully monitored.

- Central nervous system: circumoral numbness, facial tingling, vertigo, tinnitus, restlessness, anxiety, dizziness, seizure, coma
- Cardiovascular: hypotension, arrhythmia, bradycardia, heart block, cardiac arrest

Toxicity can also occur in the setting of subarachnoid injection during high spinal anesthesia. These effects include: paresthesia, paralysis, apnea, hypoventilation, fecal incontinence, and urinary incontinence. Additionally, bupivacaine can cause chondrolysis after continuous infusion into a joint space.

Bupivacaine has caused several deaths when the epidural anaesthetic has been administered intravenously accidentally.

=== Treatment of overdose ===
Animal evidence indicates intralipid, a commonly available intravenous lipid emulsion, can be effective in treating severe cardiotoxicity secondary to local anaesthetic overdose, and human case reports of successful use in this way. Plans to publicize this treatment more widely have been published.

=== Pregnancy and lactation ===
Bupivacaine crosses the placenta and is a pregnancy category C drug. However, it is approved for use at term in obstetrical anesthesia. Bupivacaine is excreted in breast milk. Risks of stopping breast feeding versus stopping bupivacaine should be discussed with the patient.

=== Postarthroscopic glenohumeral chondrolysis ===
Bupivacaine is toxic to cartilage and its intra-articular infusions may lead to postarthroscopic glenohumeral chondrolysis.

== Pharmacology ==
=== Pharmacodynamics ===
Bupivacaine binds to the intracellular portion of voltage-gated sodium channels and blocks sodium influx into nerve cells, which prevents depolarization. Without depolarization, no initiation or conduction of a pain signal can occur.

=== Pharmacokinetics ===
The rate of systemic absorption of bupivacaine and other local anesthetics is dependent upon the dose and concentration of drug administered, the route of administration, the vascularity of the administration site, and the presence or absence of epinephrine in the preparation.

- Onset of action (route and dose-dependent): 1–17 min
- Duration of action (route and dose-dependent): 2–9 hr
- Half life: neonates, 8.1 hr, adults: 2.7 hr
- Time to peak plasma concentration (for peripheral, epidural, or caudal block): 30–45 min
- Protein binding: about 95%
- Metabolism: hepatic
- Excretion: renal (6% unchanged)

== Chemical structure ==
Like lidocaine, bupivacaine is an amino-amide anesthetic; the aromatic head and the hydrocarbon chain are linked by an amide bond rather than an ester as in earlier local anesthetics. As a result, the amino-amide anesthetics are more stable and less likely to cause allergic reactions. Unlike lidocaine, the terminal amino portion of bupivacaine (as well as mepivacaine, ropivacaine, and levobupivacaine) is contained within a piperidine ring; these agents are known as pipecholyl xylidines.

== Society and culture ==
=== Legal status ===
On 17 September 2020, the Committee for Medicinal Products for Human Use (CHMP) of the European Medicines Agency (EMA) adopted a positive opinion, recommending the granting of a marketing authorization for the medicinal product Exparel, intended for the treatment of post-operative pain. The applicant for this medicinal product is Pacira Ireland Limited. Exparel liposomal was approved for medical use in the European Union in November 2020.

=== Economics ===
Bupivacaine is available as a generic medication.

== Research ==
Levobupivacaine is the (S)-(–)-enantiomer of bupivacaine, with a longer duration of action, producing less vasodilation. A biodegradable, controlled-release drug delivery system for postsurgical use is being developed as of 2010.

== See also ==
- Bupivacaine/meloxicam
