= Kenji Takagi =

Japanese orthopaedic surgeon and arthroscopy pioneer

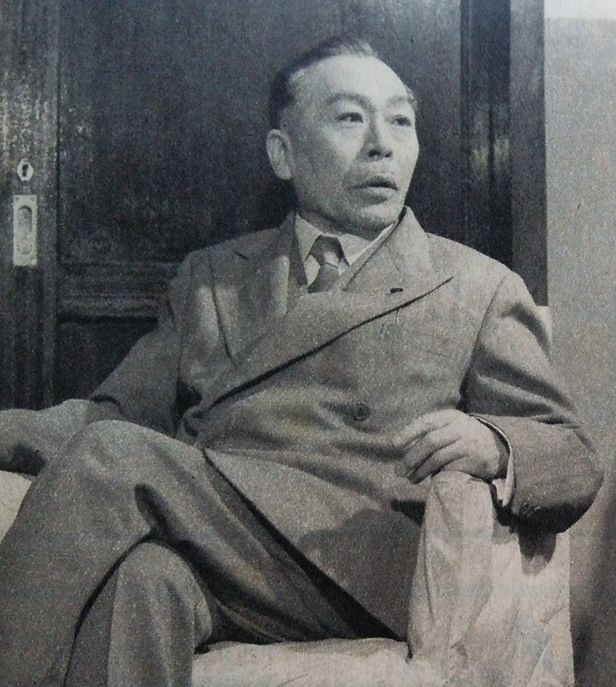
- Born: 1888
- Died: 1963 (aged 74–75)
- Scientific career
- Fields: Orthopaedics, Arthroscopy

Professor Kenji Takagi (1888–1963) was a Japanese orthopedic surgeon, noted for being one of the first people to carry out a successful arthroscopy of the knee.

Takagi was attached to Tokyo University (where he succeeded Yoshinori Tashiro) in 1918 when he carried out the ground-breaking operation on a cadaver. He had been influenced by the work of Danish surgeon Severin Nordentoft. In 1922, he went to Germany to study the use of x-ray technology there. Following World War II, Takagi's pupil Masaki Watanabe, carried on his work.
