= Intravenous regional anesthesia =

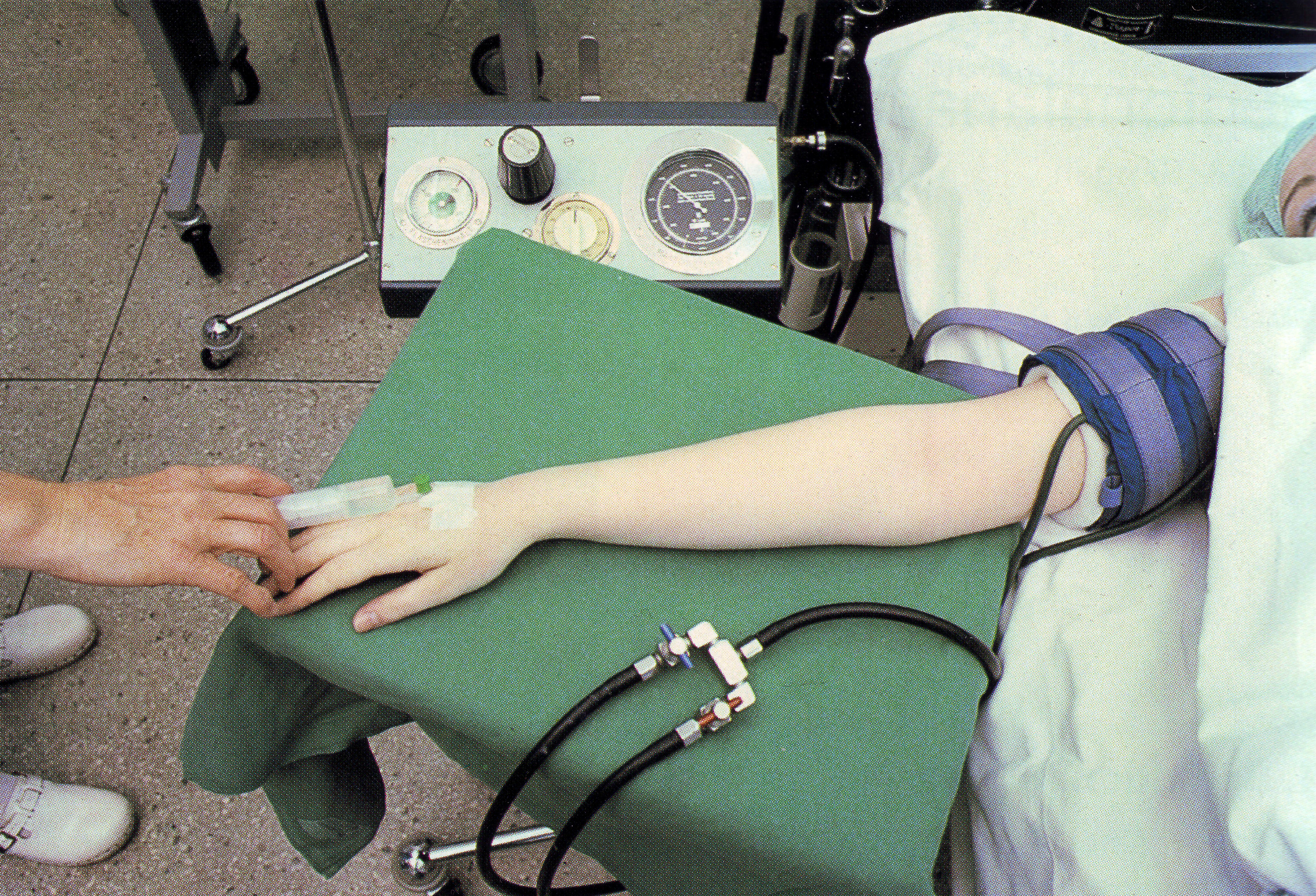
- Intravenous regional anesthesia (IVRA) using older tourniquet equipment. Modern electronic instruments include more safety features specifically for IVRA.
- MeSH: D000771

Intravenous regional anesthesia (IVRA) or Bier's block anesthesia is an anesthetic technique on the body's extremities where a local anesthetic is injected intravenously and isolated from circulation in a target area. The technique usually involves exsanguination of the target region, which forces blood out of the extremity, followed by the application of pneumatic tourniquets to safely stop blood flow. The anesthetic agent is intravenously introduced into the limb and allowed to diffuse into the surrounding tissue while tourniquets retain the agent within the desired area.

== History ==
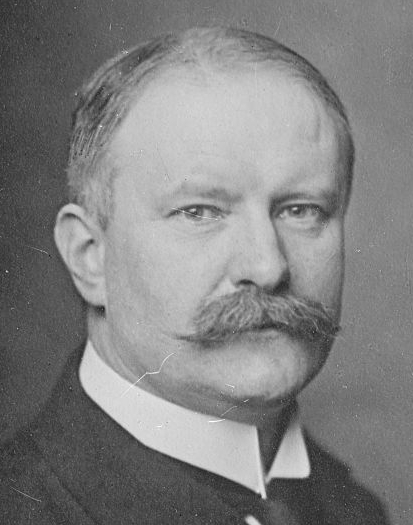
August Bier

The use of tourniquets and injected anesthesia to induce localized anesthesia was first introduced by August Bier in 1908. He used an Esmarch bandage to exsanguinate the arm and injected procaine between two tourniquets to rapidly induce anesthetic and analgesic effects in the site. Though it proved effective, IVRA remained relatively unpopular until C. McK. Holmes reintroduced it in 1963. Today, the technique is common due to its economy, rapid recovery, reliability, and simplicity.

== Methods ==
Protocols vary depending on local standard procedures and the extremity being operated on. A vast majority of practitioners begin by exsanguinating the limb as Bier did with an elastic bandage (Esmarch bandage), squeezing blood proximally toward the heart, then pneumatic tourniquets are applied to the limb and inflated 30mmHg above arterial pressure to occlude all blood vessels and then the elastic bandage is removed. A high dose of local anesthetic, typically lidocaine or prilocaine without adrenaline, is slowly injected as distally as possible into the exsanguinated limb. The veins are filled with the anesthetic, with the anesthetic setting into local tissue after approximately 6–8 minutes, after which the surgery, reduction, or manipulation of the region may begin. It is important that the region is isolated from active blood flow at this time. Analgesic effect typically remains for up to two hours depending on the dosage and type of anesthetic agent being used. The wait time and isolation of blood flow from the region is important for avoiding an overdose of the anesthetic agent in the blood which can lead to hypotension, convulsions, arrhythmia, and death. Cardiotoxic local anesthetic agents like bupivacaine and etidocaine are strictly contraindicated.

== Safety ==
The safety and effectiveness of IVRA is well established in clinical literature. However, cardiotoxic local anesthetic agents like bupivacaine and etidocaine are contraindicated. Shorter procedure times (for up to 2 hours) are preferred when IVRA is applied on the distal limb, especially on the forearm, except when the patient has contraindications to tourniquet use (such as in sickle cell anemia, where there is a risk of massive hemolysis due to low oxygen tension or hemolytic crisis due to restricted blood flow). A systematic review of IVRA-related complications found 64 cases reported between 1964 and 2005, which compares favorably against other techniques. The type of anesthetic agent, improper equipment use or selection, and technical error are prominent factors in most cases of morbidity related to IVRA. Modern practice now includes various safeguards to improve patient safety.

=== Equipment ===
Reports from anesthesiologists and surgeons cite proper selection, inspection, and maintenance of equipment as important safety measures. The safest tourniquet equipment should have IVRA-specific features such as independent limb occlusion pressure measurements for each channel, as well as dual-bladder tourniquet cuffs combined with dedicated safety lockouts that reduce human error. Additionally, IVRA protocols should include procedures for regular preventative maintenance of the equipment and performance testing, whether manual or automated, prior to surgery.

=== Drug additives ===
Adjuvants improve the safety of IVRA by promoting anesthetic action and minimizing side effects. For example, a benzodiazepine and fentanyl are often added to prevent seizures and to improve nerve blockage, respectively. One survey of anesthesiologists who practice intravenous regional anesthesia found that 98% used adjuvant benzodiazepines and/or opioids, with benzodiazepines always being given systemically (to the whole body and brain), whereas opioids can be given either systemically or locally (only into the limb being anesthetized). Most providers use drugs from both classes, a benzodiazepine and an opioid, along with the local anesthetic.

=== Procedural safeguards ===
Improved protocols, including adherence to standardized practice, may also help ameliorate the chance and the effect of complications. For example, limb protection padding and a snug tourniquet application prevents tissue damage, while sufficient but not excessive tourniquet pressure ensures that anesthetics remain within the limb without risking injury. Care should be taken to avoid the premature release or a lack of inflation in the cuff. Should complications occur, constant physiological monitoring and ready access to resuscitative drugs and equipment facilitates a speedy recuperative response.

== See also ==
- Anesthesia
- August Bier
- Pain
- Regional Anesthesia
- Surgical Tourniquets
