= William Musgrave =

British physician and antiquary (1655–1721)

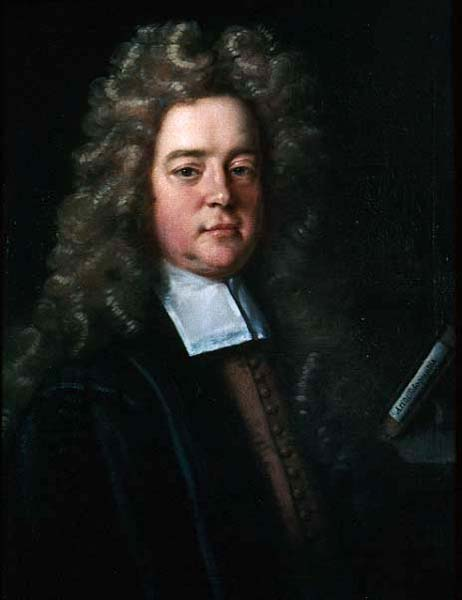
- William Musgrave, by Thomas Hawker (1640-1725), assistant to the court painter Sir Peter Lely
- Born: 1655
- Died: 1721 (aged 65–66)
- Education: Winchester College; New College, Oxford,
- Occupation: Physician
- Known for: Secretary to the Royal Society

William Musgrave (Latin: Guilhelmus Musgrave; 1655–1721) was a British physician and antiquary.

== Life ==
He was educated at Winchester College and New College, Oxford, where he was a fellow from 1677 to 1692. In 1680 he spent a brief period at the University of Leiden.

He was elected to the Royal Society in 1684, for his work in natural philosophy and medicine. During 1685 he acted as secretary to the society and edited the Philosophical Transactions nos. 167 to 178. He was a member of the Philosophical Society of Oxford, where he practised medicine and was awarded an M.D. on 6 July 1689. In 1692 he was elected to the Royal College of Physicians in London. He later settled in Exeter, where he practised until his death.

His writings on medical matters included lacteals, palsy, and respiration. His important medical works concerned arthritis and its effects. His publication De arthritide symptomatica (1703; 2nd edn, 1715) included the first scientific description of ‘Devonshire colic’ (later referred to by John Huxham and George Baker). His other writings included Antiquitates Britanno-Belgicae a study of Roman Hampshire, Wiltshire and Somerset – areas previously inhabited by the Belgae. George I presented Musgrave with a diamond ring for this work.

== Sources ==
- Cameron, A. (1998), "A west country polymath: William Musgrave MD FRS FRCP, of Exeter (1655-1721)", J Med Biogr, 8 (3): 166–170, doi:10.1177/096777209800600310, PMID 11620440, S2CID 40021661
- Courtney, William Prideaux (1894). "Musgrave, William" . In Lee, Sidney (ed.). Dictionary of National Biography. Vol. 38. London: Smith, Elder & Co.
