= Masaki Watanabe =

Japanese orthopedic surgeon

Masaki Watanabe (渡辺 正毅, 1911 – 15 October 1995) was a Japanese orthopedic surgeon, sometimes called the "founder of modern arthroscopy". Watanabe developed the first practical arthroscope.

Watanabe was born in Nagano and graduated from Tokyo Imperial University in 1937. He studied surgery under Professor Kenji Takagi, who, towards the end of World War I, had been one of the first surgeons to attempt to insert an endoscopic device into a patient. After World War II, Watanabe became director of the Department of Orthopedic Surgery at Tokyo Teishin Hospital, where he developed early arthroscopes during the 1950s, and, in 1958, he introduced the Watanabe no 21 arthroscope, which was equipped with a superior handmade lens.

When top Canadian orthopedic surgeon Robert W. Jackson visited Tokyo with the Canadian Olympic team in 1964, he came into contact with Watanabe, and this was the catalyst for the introduction of modern arthroscopic techniques into North America. In 1972, along with a group of other surgeons, Watanabe was involved in founding the International Arthroscopy Association. In 1983, he was the recipient of the Asahi Prize.
