= Devon colic =

Lead poisoning outbreak in Devon, England

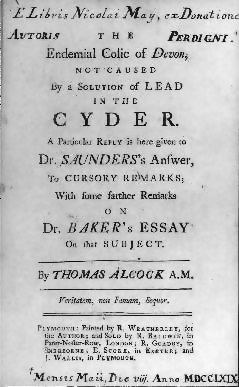
A rebuttal to claims that the colic was caused by lead poisoning from cider, written by a cider manufacturer

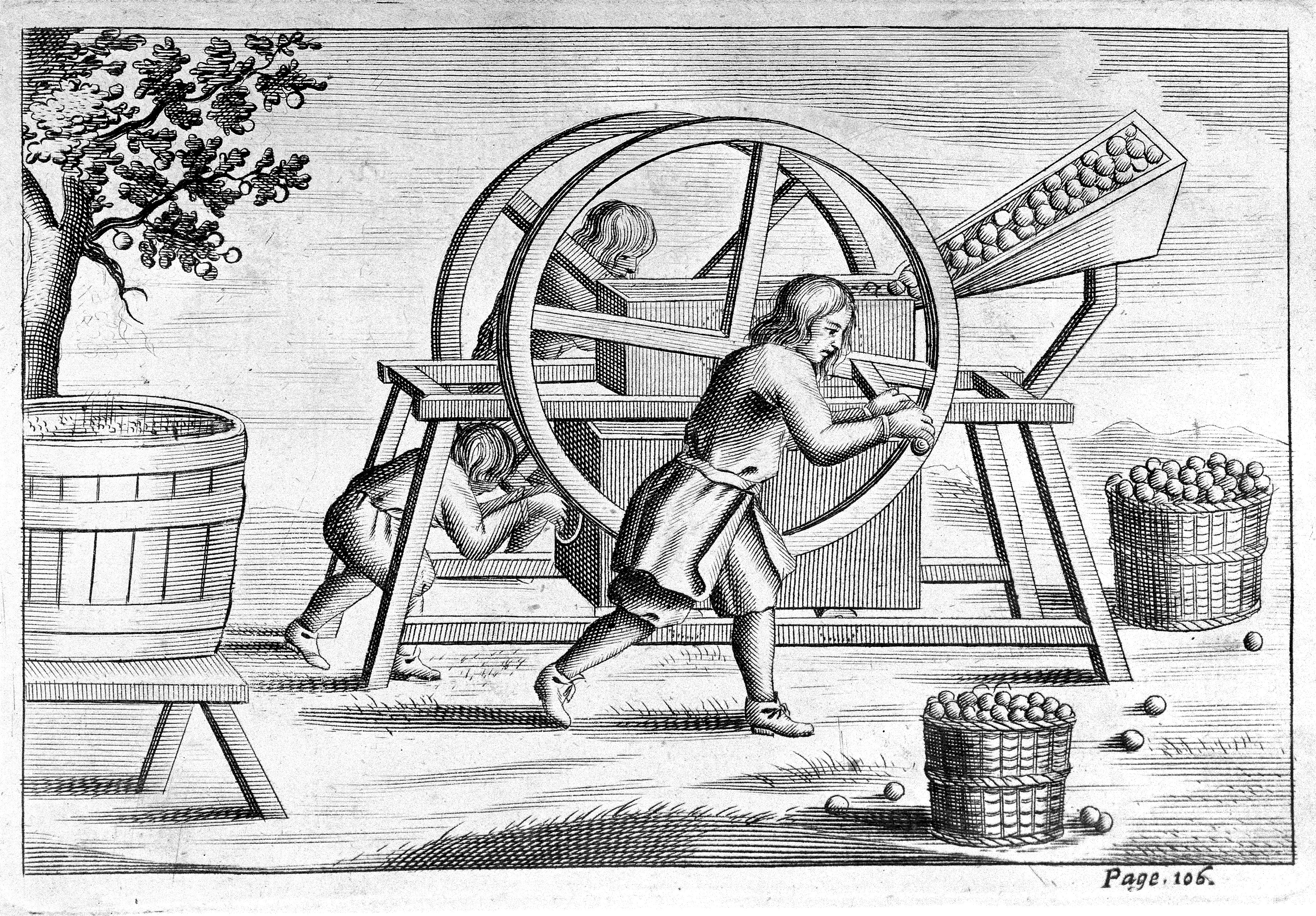
17th-century engraving of a cider press

Devon colic was a condition that affected people in the English county of Devon during parts of the 17th and 18th centuries, before it was discovered to be lead poisoning.

The first written account of the colic comes from 1655. Symptoms began with severe abdominal pains and the condition was occasionally fatal. Cider is a traditional drink of Devonians, and the connection between the colic and cider drinking had been observed for many years. The condition was commonly attributed to the acidity of the beverage.

William Musgrave's publication De arthritide symptomatica (2nd edn, 1715) included the first scientific description of "Devonshire colic" – it was later referred to by John Huxham and Sir George Baker.

However, the precise cause was not discovered until the 1760s when Dr George Baker put forward the hypothesis that poisoning from lead in cider was to blame. He observed that the symptoms of the colic were similar to those of lead poisoning. He pointed out that lead was used in the cider making process both as a component of the cider presses and in the form of lead shot which was used to clean them. He also conducted chemical tests to demonstrate the presence of lead in Devon apple juice.

The publication of his results met with some hostile reaction from cider manufacturers, keen to defend their product. Once Baker's conclusions became accepted and the elimination of lead from the cider presses was undertaken, the colic declined. By 1818, Baker's son reported that it was "hardly known to exist" in Devon.

== Poitou colic ==
An illness with identical symptoms was described from Poitou in western France in a work of 1616 by François Citois. It was known in English sources as Poitou colic. It was likewise demonstrated to be a form of lead poisoning in a 1757 publication by Théodore Tronchin of Geneva.
