= Synthol (mouthwash) =

French oral hygiene product

- Product type: Analgesic liquid
- Current owner: Haleon
- Country: France
- Introduced: 1920
- Markets: Worldwide
- Previous owners: GSK plc

Synthol is a liquid medical product brand available in France since 1920, though the nature of the product has changed through the brand's history.

== 1920s ==
Synthol was developed by Maurice Bunau-Varilla, a prominent newspaper publisher of the early twentieth century, as a tonic. He promoted it as a cure-all tonic.

== Chloral hydrate based formula ==
The brand was acquired by GlaxoSmithKline. Formerly the formula consisted of chloral hydrate, menthol, veratrol, resorcinol and salicylic acid. Sold mainly as a mouthwash in a distinctive black carton, it is also packaged as a gel and spray for the treatment of muscular pain(s).

== Today ==
Following a rupture in supply 2014–2015 the product returned to French pharmacies in June 2016 with the same composition, minus chloral hydrate, now banned, and with the indication "mouthwash" («bain de bouche») removed.

Among the new uses of the reformulation is endorsement of the Synthol gel as an umbilical cord antiseptic.

== SyntholKiné ==
A similarly named but unrelated product named SyntholKiné was launched by Glaxo in 2015.
