= Cholinergic blocking drug =

Drug that block acetylcholine in synapses of cholinergic nervous system

Chemical structure of acetylcholine

Cholinergic blocking drugs are a group of drugs that block the action of acetylcholine (ACh), a neurotransmitter, in synapses of the cholinergic nervous system. They block acetylcholine from binding to cholinergic receptors, namely the nicotinic and muscarinic receptors.

These agents have broad effects due to their actions in nerves located vastly over the body. These nerves include motor nerves in somatic nervous system which innervate skeletal muscles as well as nerves in the sympathetic and parasympathetic nervous systems. Organs that receive innervations from these systems include exocrine glands, heart, eyes, gastrointestinal tract etc. Antimuscarinic and antinicotinic agents can increase heart rate, inhibit secretions, and gastrointestinal motility.

Naturally occurring antimuscarinics were found in alkaloids from Belladonna (Solanaceae) plants. They were used as deadly poison and pupil-dilating cosmetics. While curare, the naturally occurring antinicotinics derived from Chondrodendron and Strychnos, was a poison used by South American Indians for hunting.

According to their site of actions, cholinergic blocking drugs can be classified into two general types — antimuscarinic and antinicotinic agents. Antimuscarinic agents (also known as muscarinic antagonists), including atropine and hyoscine, block acetylcholine at the muscarinic acetylcholine receptors. Antinicotinic agents (also known as ganglionic blockers, neuromuscular blockers), including tubocurarine and hexamethonium, block acetylcholine action at nicotinic acetylcholine receptors. Their effects are based on the expression of corresponding receptors in different parts of the body.

There are many adverse effects, interactions and contraindications for antinicotinic and antimuscarinic agents. Adverse effects include hypotension, dry mouth, dry eyes etc. They interact with grapefruit juice and various medications, e.g. warfarin, metoclopramide. Therefore, cautions should be exercised and advice from medical professionals should be sought before using medications.

== History ==
=== Discovery of cholinergic nervous system ===
In 1900, Reid Hunt, a pharmacologist (1870-1948), realised a fall in blood pressure in rabbits after removing adrenaline (epinephrine) from adrenal glands extract. While he initially attributed this effect to choline, he later discovered acetylcholine was 100 000 times more potent in lowering blood pressure.

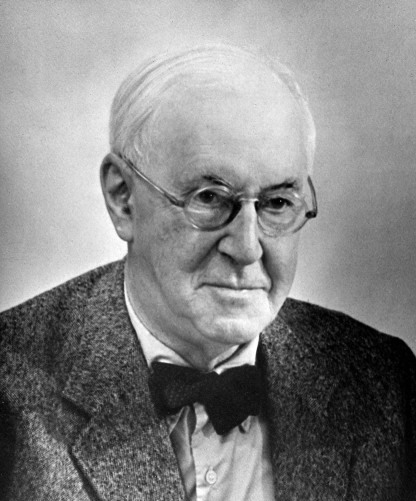
Sir Henry Hallett Dale

British physiologist Sir Henry Hallett Dale (1875-1968) observed acetylcholine for causing blood vessel dilation and slowing down heart rate. In 1914, Dale noted that the physiological effect of acetylcholine resembled the stimulation of parasympathetic nervous system and hypothesized acetylcholine as the neurotransmitter. Later, Dale named substances that mimic acetylcholine action as "cholinergics".

In 1914, Dale also distinguished two types of activities of acetylcholine, namely muscarinic and nicotinic, as they mimic the effects of injecting muscarine, extracted from poisonous mushroom Amanita muscaria, and nicotine.

=== Antimuscarinic agents ===
Naturally occurring antimuscarinics were found in alkaloids from Belladonna (Solanaceae) plants. They were used as deadly poison in Roman Empire and Middle Ages. The name Belladonna, meaning beautiful ladies, was derived from women using berry juice from the plant cosmetically to dilate their pupils.

The mydriatic effect was studied by the German chemist Friedlieb Ferdinand Runge (1795-1867), in which the active ingredient, atropine, was first discovered by Vaquelin in 1809 and was first isolated by Heinrich F. G. Mein in 1813.

In the 1850s, atropine was used as antispasmodic in asthma treatment and as morphine antidote for its mydriatic effect. Bezold and Bloebaum showed that atropine blocked the effects of vagal stimulation on the heart in 1867. Subsequently in 1872, Heidenhain found its ability to prevent salivary secretion.

=== Antinicotinic agents ===
Curare, derived from Chondrodendron and Strychnos, was used as poison by South American Indians to coat arrow tips or blow-pipe darts for hunting animals. It is first identified when Spanish soldiers were attacked by these indigenous tribes in the 16th century.

In 1906, Langley studied the actions of nicotine and curare on chicken and frog muscles. Curare was found to block the stimulant action of nicotine in both innervated and chronically denervated muscles. In 1940, Jenkinson identified tubocurarine as a competitive antagonist of acetylcholine.

Curare and tubocurarine had important roles in establishing the concept of specific cholinoceptors in the motor end plate. At right dose, they are used as general anesthetic for relaxing abdominal muscles in operations.

== General effects on body ==
=== Antimuscarinic agents ===
Muscarinic receptors are G-protein coupled receptors that present mainly in the parasympathetic system and sweat gland. Antimuscarinc agents, therefore, generally produce effects that are opposite to the stimulation of the parasympathetic system, which is responsible for "rest and digest".

Location	Effects
Exocrine glands	Inhibition of secretions in salivary, lacrimal, bronchial and sweat glands; Dry mouth, dry skin; Gastric secretion is only slightly reduced; Bronchial mucociliary clearance inhibition leading to accumulation of residual secretion in lungs
Cardiovascular system	Increased heart rate (tachycardia); Unaffected arterial blood pressure and response to exercise
Eye	Pupil dilation (mydriasis) and unresponsive to light; Relaxation of ciliary muscle causes paralysis of accommodation (cycloplegia) and impaired near vision; Raised intraocular pressure
Gastrointestinal tract	Inhibition of motility
Other smooth muscle	Relaxation of bronchial smooth muscle; Biliary and urinary tract smooth muscle only slightly affected, might precipitate urinary retention
Central Nervous System (CNS)	Restlessness, agitation, disorientation

=== Antinicotinic agent ===
Nicotinic receptors are ligand-gated ion channels that present in both parasympathetic and sympathetic ganglions, while the antagonistic effect of antinicotinic agents depend on which system predominates in a particular site. Nicotinic receptors are also present in neuromuscular junctions and the brain.

Location	Predominant system	Effects
Exocrine glands	Parasympathetic except sweat glands	Inhibition of secretions in salivary, lacrimal, bronchial and sweat glands
Heart	Parasympathetic	Increased heart rate (tachycardia)
Blood vessels	Sympathetic	Vasodilation; Decreased blood pressure; Loss of cardiovascular reflex causing postural hypotension
Eye	Parasympathetic	Pupil dilation (mydriasis) and unresponsive to light; Relaxation of ciliary muscle causes paralysis of accommodation (cycloplegia) and impaired near vision
Gastrointestinal tract	Parasympathetic	Decreased peristalsis; Decreased secretion
Other smooth muscle	Parasympathetic	Relaxation of bronchial, urinary bladder smooth muscle
Neuromuscular junction	N/A	Muscle relaxation; Neuromuscular block or paralysis

== Clinical uses ==
Listed below are some examples of antimuscarinic and antinicotinic agents according to the British National Formulary, including non-clinically one for better illustration of their site of actions.

=== Antimuscarinic agents ===
Antimuscarinic agents are muscarinic antagonists and they bind to muscarinic cholinergic receptors postsynaptically without activating them. They occupy and prevent acetylcholine from binding to the active sites of receptors to elicit their effect.

Examples	Properties	Clinical use	Notes
Atropine	Non-selective antagonist; Good oral absorption; CNS stimulant (cross blood-brain barrier)	Ophthalmologic examination: Cause cycloplegic effect, i.e. paralysis of ciliary muscle and loss of accommodation; Topical application; Surgery Premedication: Inhibit saliva secretion; Maintain normal heartbeat; Myopia: Slow down Myopia progression in children.; New off-label treatment; Animal studies showed dopamine and DOPAC increase in the chick retina, important in ocular growth and myopia development.; Acute symptomatic bradycardia: Increase heart rate, improve signs and symptoms; First-line treatment; Intravenous administration	Belladonna alkaloid; Side effects include urinary retention, dry mouth, blurred vision
Glycopyrrolate	Quaternary ammonium compound; Does not cross blood-brain barrier	Hyperhidrosis: Reduce rate of sweating by blocking parasympathetic receptors in the central nervous system, smooth muscle, and sweat glands	First drug approved by FDA in 2018 for hyperhidrosis
Dicycloverine (Dicyclomine)	Similar to atropine	Bowel Colic: Relax intestinal smooth muscles and cramps by inhibiting parasympathetic system and intrinsic primary afferent nerves (IPAN)	Taken orally or intramuscularly
Hyoscine (Scopolamine)	Similar to atropine; CNS depressant	Motion sickness: Prevent vomiting by inhibiting cerebellum and solitary nucleus from activating vomiting centre; Taken before travelling as antiemetics; Bowel Colic: Similar to Dicycloverine	Belladonna alkaloid; Causes sedation; Side effects similar to atropine; Prevention drug for motion sickness instead of treatment medication
Tiotropium	Similar to atropine; Does not inhibit bronchial mucociliary clearance; Poor absorption	Asthma and Chronic Obstructive Pulmonary Disease (COPD): Dilate airway by relaxing bronchial smooth muscles	Quaternary ammonium compound
Ipratropium	Similar to atropine; Does not inhibit bronchial mucociliary clearance; Poor absorption	Asthma and Chronic Obstructive Pulmonary Disease (COPD): Dilate airway by relaxing bronchial smooth muscles	Quaternary ammonium compound
Tropicamide	Similar to atropine; May increase intraocular pressure	Ophthalmologic examination: Similar to atropine	Similar to atropine but shorter acting
Cyclopentolate	Similar to atropine; May increase intraocular pressure	Ophthalmologic examination: Similar to atropine	Similar to atropine but shorter acting
Darifenacin	M3 receptor selective	Urinary incontinence: Inhibit micturition by relaxing bladder smooth muscles	Used in urinary incontinence; Few side effects

=== Antinicotinic agents ===
Antinicotinic agents are classified into ganglionic blockers and neuromuscular blockers.

Ganglionic blockers are of little clinical use as they act at all autonomic ganglions. They act by:

- Interfering acetylcholine release
- Prolonged depolarization (depolarisation block), i.e. stimulation then block stimulation
- Competitive inhibition of nicotinic receptor

Examples	Mechanism of action	Properties	Clinical use
Nicotine	Prolonged depolarization	Non-competitive block	Smoking Cessation: Eliminate symptoms of nicotine withdrawing; Given in low dose
Acetylcholine (in presence of cholinesterase inhibitors)	Prolonged depolarization	Non-competitive block	No clinical use as ganglionic blocker
Hexamethonium	Competitive inhibition of nicotinic receptor	Selective; First effective hypertension drug treatment	No longer clinically use due to side effect
Trimethaphan	Competitive inhibition of nicotinic receptor	Selective; Short duration of action	Blood pressure lowering in surgery (rarely use)
Tubocurarine	Competitive inhibition of nicotinic receptor	Non-selective; Cause histamine release, so greater side effects comparing with Atracurium	Rarely used
Atracurium	Competitive inhibition of nicotinic receptor	Safer alternative to tubocurarine with less side effects	Surgical anaesthetic & intubation: facilitate endotracheal intubation and provide skeletal muscle relaxation to reduce the risk of laryngeal injury.

Neuromuscular blockers act at neuromuscular junction by:

- Inhibiting acetylcholine synthesis
- Inhibiting acetylcholine release
- Blocking acetylcholine receptors postsynaptically
- Prolonged depolarization of motor end plate

Examples	Mechanism of action	Onset	Duration of action	Properties	Clinical use
Hemicholinium	Inhibiting acetylcholine synthesis	/	/	Block choline transport into nerve terminal; Use experimentally only	No clinical use
Vesamicol	Inhibiting acetylcholine synthesis	/	/	Block acetylcholine transport into synaptic vesicle; Use experimentally to investigate potential treatment in situ pulmonary adenocarcinoma	No clinical use
Botulinum toxin	Inhibiting acetylcholine release	3–5 days	3–4 months	Very potent; Botulinum poisoning cause parasympathetic and motor paralysis	Muscle relaxants: Treat cervical dystonia, spasticity, blepharospasm and overactive bladder; Injected to paralyse muscles around face, hence reducing wrinkles (clinical or cosmetic uses); Reduce secretion: Used in patients with hyperhidrosis and sialorrhoea; Headache prophylaxis: Intramuscular or subcutaneous administration can reduce migraine frequency and severity
Beta-bungarotoxin	Inhibiting acetylcholine release	/	/	Venom found in krait snakes	No clinical use
Tubocurarine	Blocking acetylcholine receptors postsynaptically	Slow (> 5mins)	Long (1-2h)	Plant alkaloid	Rarely used
Alcuronium	Blocking acetylcholine receptors postsynaptically	Slow (> 5mins)	Long (1-2h)	Semisynthetic derivative of tubocurarine; Fewer side effect than tubocurarine	No clinical use currently
Pancuronium	Blocking acetylcholine receptors postsynaptically	Intermediate (2-3 min)	Long (1-2h)	First steroid-based compound	Surgery Premedication: Endotracheal intubation and to produce muscle relaxation in general anaesthesia during surgery; Euthanasic agent: Ceases breathing and induce coma after sodium thiopental administration; Recommended in euthanasia protocol to in Belgium and Netherlands
Pipecuronium	Blocking acetylcholine receptors postsynaptically	Intermediate (2-3 min)	Long (1-2h)	Similar to pancuronium	Surgery Premedication: Similar to pancuronium but with less cardiovascular side effect
Vecuronium	Blocking acetylcholine receptors postsynaptically	Intermediate	Intermediate (30-40min)	Widely used	Surgery Premedication: Similar to pancuronium
Rocuronium	Blocking acetylcholine receptors postsynaptically	Intermediate	Intermediate (30-40min)	Similar to vecuronium with faster onset	Surgery Premedication: Similar to pancuronium
Atracurium	Blocking acetylcholine receptors postsynaptically	Intermediate	Intermediate (<30 min)	Widely used	Surgery Premedication: Similar to pancuronium
Doxacurium	Blocking acetylcholine receptors postsynaptically	Intermediate	Intermediate (<30 min)	Chemically similar to atracurium; Stable in plasma; Longer duration of action	Surgery Premedication: Similar to pancuronium
Cisatracurium	Blocking acetylcholine receptors postsynaptically	Intermediate	Intermediate (<30 min)	Pure active isomeric constituent of atracurium; More potent	Surgery Premedication: Similar to pancuronium
Mivacurium	Blocking acetylcholine receptors postsynaptically	Fast (~2mins)	Short (~15 mins)	Chemically similar to atracurium; Rapidly inactivated by plasma cholinesterase	Surgery Premedication: Similar to pancuronium
Suxamethonium	Prolonged depolarization of motor end plate	Fast	Short	Rapidly inactivated by plasma cholinesterase; Used for brief procedure, e.g. intubation	Surgery Premedication: Similar to pancuronium
Rocuronium	Prolonged depolarization of motor end plate	Fast	Short	Fewer unwanted effect than suxamethonium	Surgery Premedication: Similar to pancuronium

== Adverse effects ==
=== Drug reactions ===
The following are some side effects after taking either antinicotinic or anticholinergic medications. They vary from mild to severe and some of these effects depends on the duration of drug usage.

Cognitive function decline (Confusion, memory loss and difficulty in concentration) paralysis, Tachycardia, Hypotension (Anticholinergics are histamine-inducing, leading to vasodilation during anaphylactic reaction, hence a dropping in blood pressure), constipation, dry mouth, dry eyes, hypohidrosis/ anhidrosis, blurry vision, or Increase in intraocular pressure, increase in the risk of glaucoma.

=== Overdose ===
Anticholinergic overdose, both antinicotinic and antimuscarinic, can exert toxic effects on both central and peripheral systems. The following symptoms could be presented:

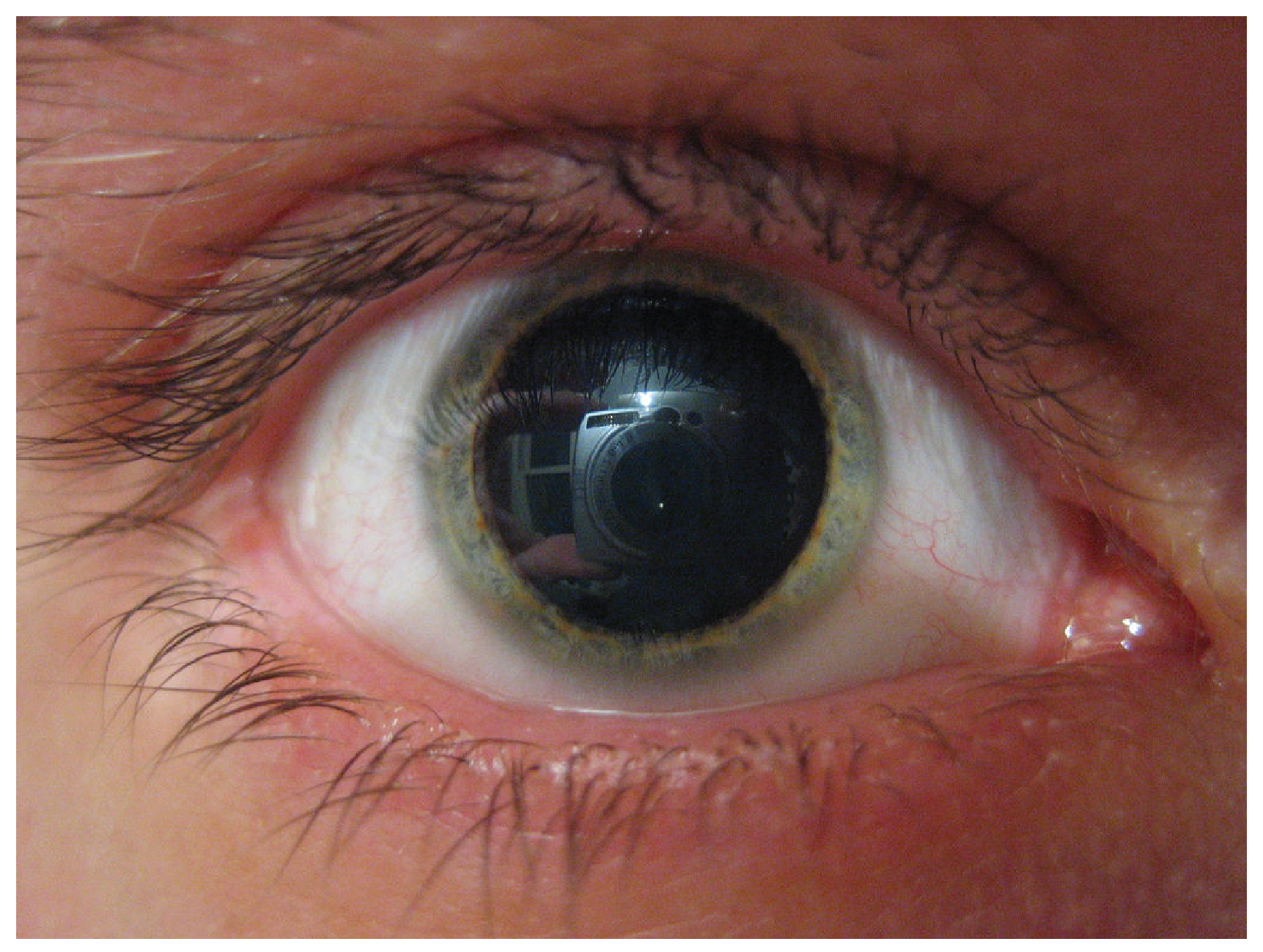
Mydriasis

Mild symptoms include tachycardia, flushed face, mydriasis and blurred vision, fever, dry mouth and skin, and urinary retention. Early stage of overdose can lead to central nervous system stimulation, for instance, hyperactivity, followed by depression, such as agitation (Anxiety or nervous), delirium, disorientation, hallucinations, seizures, hypertension, or hyperthermia. In late or severe stage of overdose, it could lead to coma, medullary paralysis, death.

Physostigmine structure

Supportive care is usually performed in anticholinergic toxicated patients. Intravenous benzodiazepine is used as a first-line treatment for agitation. Cooling measures are employed if there is any significant hyperthermia. Activated charcoal is only given within one hour of anticholinergic ingestion. Physostigmine is given only if presenting both peripheral and central signs and symptoms of anticholinergic poisoning. Physostigmine is a central and peripheral acting acetylcholinesterase inhibitor and generally given to patients with pure anticholinergic poisoning.

== Interactions ==
Combined use of medications with anticholinergics may cause synergistic (supra-additive), additive, or antagonistic interactions, leading to no therapeutic effect or overdosing. Below listed are some medications or food that can interact with anticholinergics.

Medications indicated for:

- Irregular heartbeat, e.g. disopyramide, quinidine. Drug-induced arrhythmia worsened by anticholinergics' side effect of tachycardia.
- Parkinson's disease, e.g. levodopa. Atropine decreases the absorption of levodopa.
- Preventing travel sickness, relieve stomach cramps or spasms, e.g. hyoscine. Additive effect.
- Nausea and vomiting, e.g. cyclizine. Additive effect.
- Parasympathetic stimulation, e.g. bethanechol, pilocarpine, carbachol
- Antihistamines e.g. chlorpheniramine, diphenhydramine, promethazine. They have similar structures as anticholinergics, causing additive effect.
- Tricyclic antidepressants, e.g. amitriptyline, clomipramine. Additive effect.
- Adrenergic decongestants, e.g. phenylephrine. Combined use with atropine increases the risk of severe hypertension.
- Alzheimer's disease e.g. rivastigmine and donepezil. May reduce seizure threshold.
- Muscle relaxants for surgery.
- Grapefruit juice and grapefruit-based products. CYP3A4 inhibitor which may reduce or amplify drug effect, such as darifenacin.

== Contraindications ==
The followings are the common contraindications adopted from the British National Formulary.

=== Antimuscarinic agents ===
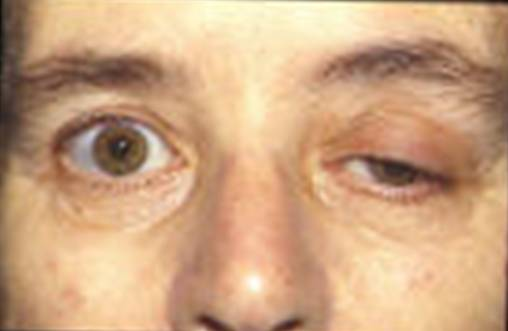
Drooping of eyelid in myasthenia gravis

For all antimuscarinics,

- Angle-closure glaucoma
- Bladder outlet obstruction (BOO)
- Myasthenia gravis
- Gastro-intestinal obstruction
- Toxic megacolon
- Urinary retention
- Paralytic ileus
- Intestinal atony (paralysis of muscles)
- Severe ulcerative colitis
- Hypertension, especially M2 receptor antagonists

=== Antinicotinic agents ===
For anticholinergics, such as

- Trimethoprim:
  - Blood dyscrasias
- Suxamethonium:
  - Hyperkalemia
  - Low plasma-cholinesterase activity e.g. severe liver disease
  - Major trauma
  - Personal or family history of congenital myotonic disease
  - Personal or family history of malignant hyperthermia
  - Prolonged immobilisation
  - Severe burns
  - Skeletal muscle myopathies e.g. Duchenne muscular dystrophy
