= Neuromuscular-blocking drug =

Type of paralyzing anesthetic including lepto- and pachycurares

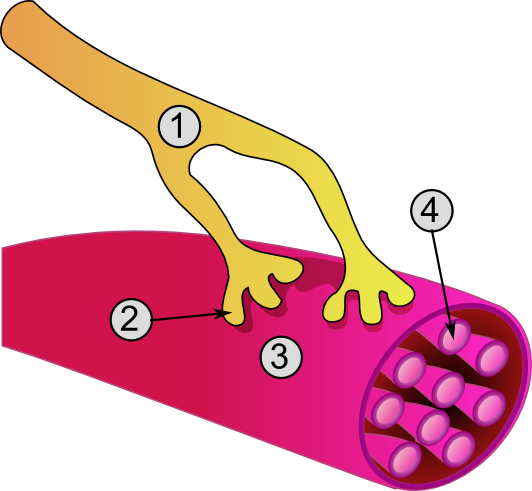
Global view of a neuromuscular junction: 1. Axon; 2. Motor end-plate; 3. Muscle fiber; 4. Myofibril

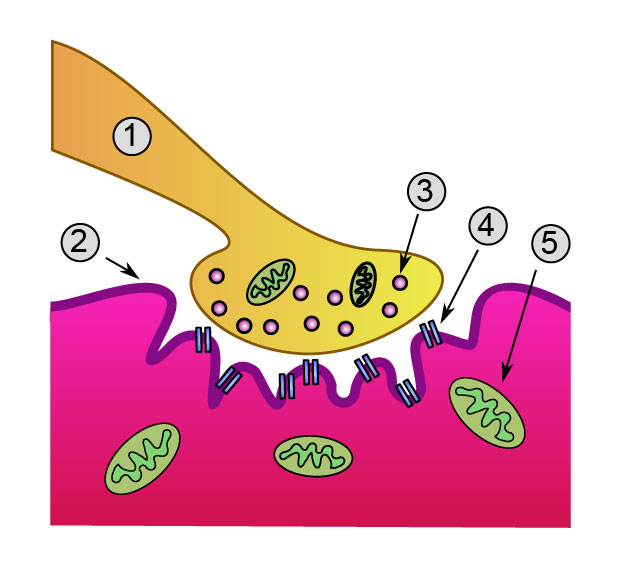
Detailed view of a neuromuscular junction: 1. Presynaptic terminal; 2. Sarcolemma; 3. Synaptic vesicle; 4. Nicotinic acetylcholine receptor; 5. Mitochondrion

Neuromuscular-blocking drugs, or Neuromuscular blocking agents (NMBAs), block transmission at the neuromuscular junction, causing paralysis of the affected skeletal muscles. This is accomplished via their action on the post-synaptic acetylcholine (Nm) receptors.

In clinical use, neuromuscular block is used adjunctively to anesthesia to produce paralysis, firstly to paralyze the vocal cords, and permit endotracheal intubation, and secondly to optimize the surgical field by inhibiting spontaneous ventilation, and causing relaxation of skeletal muscles. Because the appropriate dose of neuromuscular-blocking drug may paralyze muscles required for breathing (i.e., the diaphragm), mechanical ventilation should be available to maintain adequate respiration.

This class of medications helps to reduce patient movement, breathing, or ventilator dyssynchrony and allows lower insufflation pressures during laparoscopy. It has several indications for use in the intensive care unit. It can help reduce hoarseness in voice as well as injury to the vocal cords during intubation. In addition, it plays an important role in facilitating mechanical ventilation in patients with poor lung function.

Patients are still aware of pain even after full conduction block has occurred, so general anesthetics and/or analgesics must also be given to prevent anesthesia awareness.

== Nomenclature ==
Neuromuscular blocking drugs are often classified into two broad classes:

- Pachycurares, which are bulky molecules with nondepolarizing activity
- Leptocurares, which are thin and flexible molecules that tend to have depolarizing activity.

It is also common to classify them based on their chemical structure.

- Acetylcholine, suxamethonium, and decamethonium

Suxamethonium was synthesised by connecting two acetylcholine molecules and has the same number of heavy atoms between methonium heads as decamethonium. Just like acetylcholine, succinylcholine, decamethonium and other polymethylene chains, of the appropriate length and with two methonium, heads have small trimethyl onium heads and flexible links. They all exhibit a depolarizing block.

- Aminosteroids

Pancuronium, vecuronium, rocuronium, rapacuronium, dacuronium, malouètine, dihydrochandonium, dipyrandium, pipecuronium, chandonium (HS-310), HS-342 and other HS- compounds are aminosteroidal agents. They have in common the steroid structural base, which provides a rigid and bulky body. Most of the agents in this category would also be classified as non-depolarizing.

- Tetrahydroisoquinoline derivatives

Compounds based on the tetrahydroisoquinoline moiety such as atracurium, mivacurium, and doxacurium would fall in this category. They have a long and flexible chain between the onium heads, except for the double bond of mivacurium. D-tubocurarine and dimethyltubocurarine are also in this category. Most of the agents in this category would be classified as non-depolarizing.

- Gallamine and other chemical classes

Gallamine is a trisquaternary ether with three ethonium heads attached to a phenyl ring through an ether linkage. Many other different structures have been used for their muscle relaxant effect such as alcuronium (alloferin), anatruxonium, diadonium, fazadinium (AH8165) and tropeinium.

- Novel NMB agents

In recent years much research has been devoted to new types of quaternary ammonium muscle relaxants. These are asymmetrical diester isoquinolinium compounds and bis-benzyltropinium compounds that are bistropinium salts of various diacids. These classes have been developed to create muscle relaxants that are faster and shorter acting. Both the asymmetric structure of diester isoquinolinium compounds and the acyloxylated benzyl groups on the bisbenzyltropiniums destabilizes them and can lead to spontaneous breakdown and therefore possibly a shorter duration of action.

== Classification ==
These drugs fall into two groups:

- Non-depolarizing blocking agents: These agents constitute the majority of the clinically relevant neuromuscular blockers. They act by competitively blocking the binding of ACh to its receptors, and in some cases, they also directly block the ionotropic activity of the ACh receptors.
- Depolarizing blocking agents: These agents act by depolarizing the sarcolemma of the skeletal muscle fiber. This persistent depolarization makes the muscle fiber resistant to further stimulation by ACh.

=== Non-depolarizing blocking agents ===
A neuromuscular non-depolarizing agent is a form of neuromuscular blocker that does not depolarize the motor end plate.

The quaternary ammonium muscle relaxants belong to this class. Quaternary ammonium muscle relaxants are quaternary ammonium salts used as drugs for muscle relaxation, most commonly in anesthesia. It is necessary to prevent spontaneous movement of muscle during surgical operations. Muscle relaxants inhibit neuron transmission to muscle by blocking the nicotinic acetylcholine receptor. What they have in common, and is necessary for their effect, is the structural presence of quaternary ammonium groups, usually two. Some of them are found in nature and others are synthesized molecules.

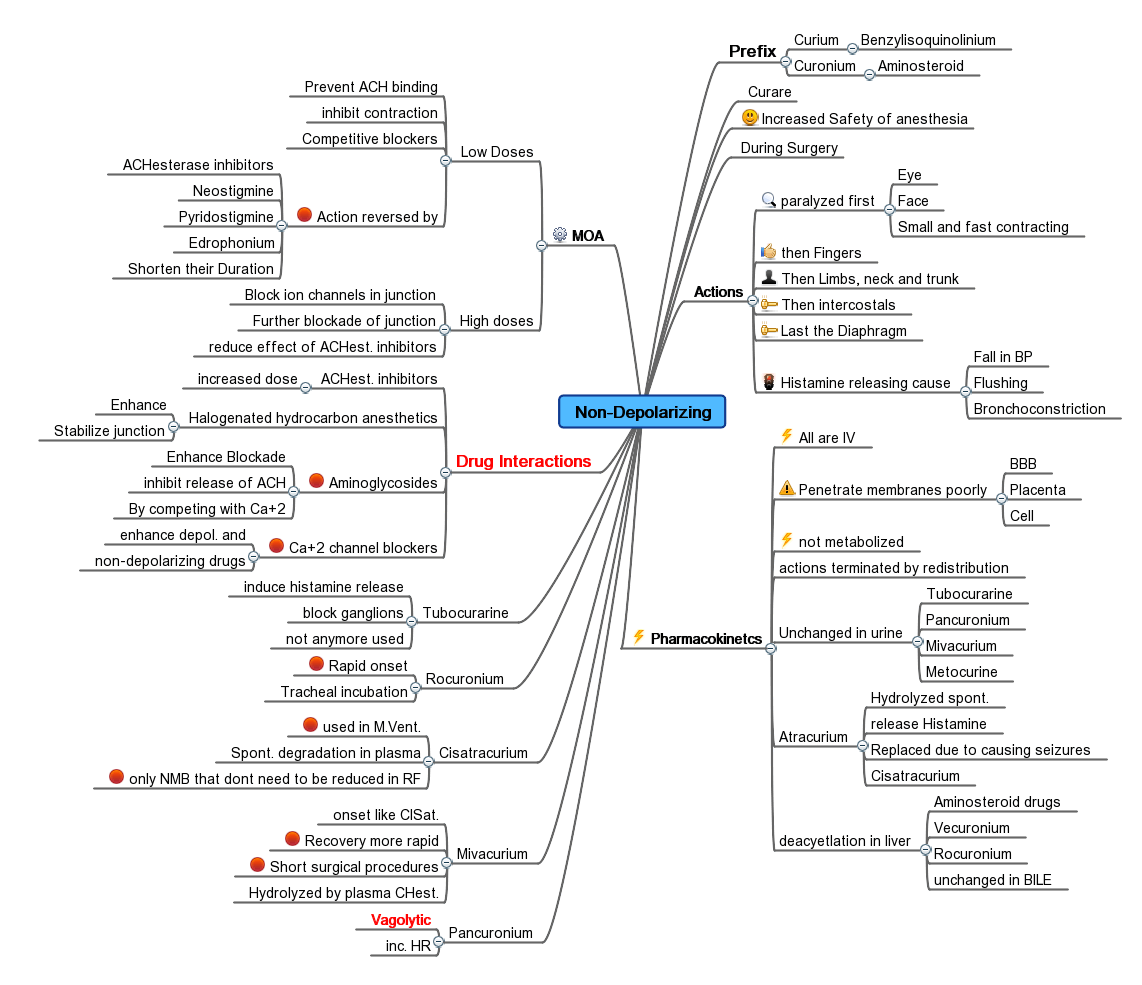
Mind Map showing a summary of Neuromuscular nondepolarizing agent

Below are some more common agents that act as competitive antagonists against acetylcholine at the site of postsynaptic acetylcholine receptors.

Tubocurarine, found in curare of the South American plant Pareira, Chondrodendron tomentosum, is the prototypical non-depolarizing neuromuscular blocker. It has a slow onset (<5 min) and a long duration of action (30 mins). Side-effects include hypotension, which is partially explained by its effect of increasing histamine release, a vasodilator, as well as its effect of blocking autonomic ganglia. It is excreted in the urine.

This drug needs to block about 70–80% of the ACh receptors for neuromuscular conduction to fail, and hence for effective blockade to occur. At this stage, end-plate potentials (EPPs) can still be detected, but are too small to reach the threshold potential needed for activation of muscle fiber contraction.

The speed of onset depends on the potency of the drug, greater potency is associated with slower onset of block. Rocuronium, with an ED_{95} of 0.3 mg/kg IV has a more rapid onset than Vecuronium with an ED_{95} of 0.05 mg/kg. Steroidal compounds, such as rocuronium and vecuronium, are intermediate-acting drugs while Pancuronium and pipecuronium are long-acting drugs.

Comparison of non-depolarizing neuromuscular blocking agents
Agent	Time to onset (seconds)	Duration (minutes)	Side effects	Clinical use	Storage
Rapacuronium (Raplon)			Bronchospasm	Withdrawn due to Bronchospasm risk	
Mivacurium (Mivacron)	90	12–18	hypotension (transiently), by release of histamine	No longer manufactured secondary to marketing, manufacturing, and financial concerns	refrigerated
Atracurium (Tracrium)	90	30 min or less	hypotension, transiently, by release of histamine; Toxic metabolite called laudanosine, greater accumulation in individuals with renal failure	widely	refrigerated
Doxacurium (Nuromax)		long	hypotension, transiently, by release of histamine; Harmful metabolite called laudanosine (lowering seizure threshold); greater accumulation in individuals with renal failure		
Cisatracurium (Nimbex)	90	60–80	does not cause release of histamine		refrigerated
Vecuronium (Norcuron)	60	30–40	Few, may cause prolonged paralysis and promote muscarinic block	widely	non-refrigerated
Rocuronium (Zemuron)	75	45–70	may promote muscarinic block		non-refrigerated
Pancuronium (Pavulon)	90	180 or more	tachycardia (slight); (no hypotension)	widely	non-refrigerated
Tubocurarine (Jexin)	300 or more	60–120	hypotension (by ganglion-block and histamine release); Bronchoconstriction (by histamine release)	rarely	
gallamine (Flaxedil)	300 or more	60–120	tachycardia		non-refrigerated
Pipecuronium	90	180 or more	tachycardia (slight); (no hypotension)		non-refrigerated

Comparison of properties of nondepolarising neuromuscular blocking agents.
Drug	Elimination Site	Clearance (mL/kg/min)	Approximate Potency Relative to Tubocurarine
Isoquinoline derivatives			
Tubocurarine	Kidney (40%)	2.3-2.4	1
Atracurium	Spontaneous	5-6	1.5
Cisatracurium	Mostly Spontaneous	2.7	1.5
Doxacurium	Kidney	2.7	6
Metocurine	Kidney (40%)	1.2	4
Mivacurium	Plasma ChE^{2}	70-95	4
Steroid derivatives
Pancuronium	Kidney (80%)	1.7-1.8	6
Pipecuronium	Kidney (60%) and liver	2.5-3.0	6
Rapacuronium	Liver	6-11	0.4
Rocuronium	Liver (75–90%) and kidney	2.9	0.8
Vecuronium	Liver (75–90%) and kidney	3-5.3	6

In larger clinical dose, some of the blocking agent can access the pore of the ion channel and cause blockage. This weakens neuromuscular transmission and diminishes the effect of acetylcholinesterase inhibitors (e.g. neostigmine). Nondepolarizing NBAs may also block prejunctional sodium channels which interfere with the mobilization of acetylcholine at the nerve ending.

=== Depolarizing blocking agents ===
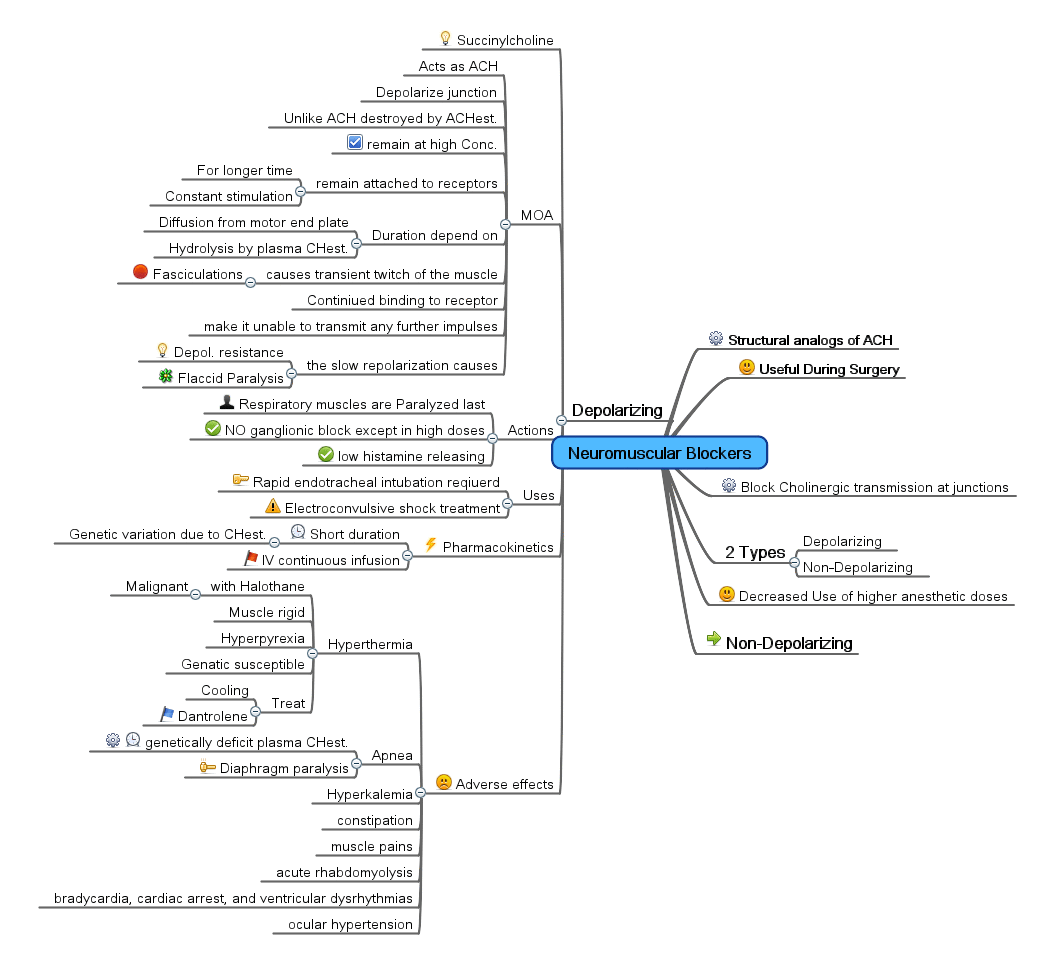
Mind Map showing a summary of Neuromuscular depolarizing agent

A depolarizing neuromuscular blocking agent is a form of neuromuscular blocker that depolarizes the motor end plate. An example is succinylcholine. Depolarizing blocking agents work by depolarizing the plasma membrane of the muscle fiber, similar to acetylcholine. However, these agents are more resistant to degradation by acetylcholinesterase, the enzyme responsible for degrading acetylcholine, and can thus more persistently depolarize the muscle fibers. This differs from acetylcholine, which is rapidly degraded and only transiently depolarizes the muscle.

These agents have two phases of block with notably different characteristics. During phase I (depolarizing phase), succinylcholine interacts with nicotinic receptor to open the channel and cause depolarization of the end plate, which later spread to and result in depolarization of adjacent membranes. As a result, there is a disorganised contraction of muscle motor unit. This causes muscular fasciculations (muscle twitches) while they are depolarizing the muscle fibers. The muscle fiber is then held in a partially depolarised state leading to relaxation.

Further administration of the agent leads to phase II block which has a similar clinical behaviour to non-depolarising blocking agents. Phase II block is characterised by complete membrane repolarisation however there is still ongoing neuromuscular blockade, the mechanism of phase II block is not fully understood. Phase I block effect is increased by cholinesterase inhibitors as increase in acetylcholine levels leads to deepening of the phase I block due to the membrane potential being pushed further away from repolarisation, however in phase II block cholinesterase inhibitors inhibit the block.

The prototypical depolarizing blocking drug is succinylcholine (suxamethonium). It is the only such drug used clinically. It has a rapid onset (30 seconds) but very short duration of action (5–10 minutes) because of hydrolysis by various cholinesterases (such as butyrylcholinesterase in the blood). The patient will experience fasciculation due to the depolarisation of muscle neuron fibres and seconds later, flaccid paralysis will occur. Succinylcholine was originally known as diacetylcholine because structurally it is composed of two acetylcholine molecules joined with a methyl group. Decamethonium is sometimes, but rarely, used in clinical practice.

It is indicated for rapid sequence intubation.

==== Dosing/onset of action ====
IV dose 1-1.5 mg/kg or 3 to 5 x ED_{95}

Paralysis occurs in one to two minutes.

Clinical duration of action (time from drug administration to recovery of single twich to 25% of baseline) is 7–12 minutes.

If IV access is unavailable, intramuscular administration 3–4 mg/kg. Paralysis occurs at 4 minutes.

Use of succinylcholine infusion or repeated bolus administration increase the risk of Phase II block and prolonged paralysis. Phase II block occurs after large doses (>4 mg/kg). This occurs when the post-synaptic membrane action potential returns to baseline in spite of the presence of succinylcholine and causes continued activation of nicotinic acetylcholine receptors.

=== Comparison of drugs ===
The main difference is in the reversal of these two types of neuromuscular-blocking drugs.

- Non-depolarizing blockers are reversed by acetylcholinesterase inhibitor drugs since non-depolarizing blockers are competitive antagonists at the ACh receptor so can be reversed by increases in ACh.
- The depolarizing blockers already have ACh-like actions, so these agents have prolonged effect under the influence of acetylcholinesterase inhibitors. Administration of depolarizing blockers initially produces fasciculations (a sudden twitch just before paralysis occurs). This is due to depolarization of the muscle. Also, post-operative pain is associated with depolarizing blockers.

The tetanic fade is the failure of muscles to maintain a fused tetany at sufficiently high frequencies of electrical stimulation.

- Non-depolarizing blockers have this effect on patients, probably by an effect on presynaptic receptors.
- Depolarizing blockers do not cause the tetanic fade. However, a clinically similar manifestation called Phase II block occurs with repeated doses of suxamethonium.

This discrepancy is diagnostically useful in case of intoxication of an unknown neuromuscular-blocking drug.

Comparison of a typical nondepolarizing muscle relexant (tubocarine) and a depolarizing muscle relexant (succinylcholine).
	Tubocurarine	Succinylcholine	
	Tubocurarine	Phase I	Phase II
Administration of tubocurarine	Additive	Antagonistic	Augmented
Administration of succinylcholine	Antagonistic	Additive	Augmented
Effect of neostigmine	Antagonistic	Augmented	Antagonistic
Initial excitatory effect on skeletal muscle	None	Fasciculations	None
Response to a tetanic stimulus	Un-sustained (fade)	sustained (not fade)	Un-sustained (fade)
Post-tetanic facilitation	Yes	No	Yes
Rate of recovery	30-60 min	4-8 min	> 20 min

== Physiology at the neuromuscular junction ==
Neuromuscular blocking agents exert their effect by modulating the signal transmission in skeletal muscles. An action potential is, in other words, a depolarisation in neuron membrane due to a change in membrane potential greater than the threshold potential leads to an electrical impulse generation. The electrical impulse travels along the pre-synaptic neuron axon to synapse with the muscle at the neuromuscular junction (NMJ) to cause muscle contraction.

When the action potential reaches the axon terminal, it triggers the opening of the calcium ion gated channels, which causes the influx of Ca^{2+}. Ca^{2+} will stimulate the release of neurotransmitter in the neurotransmitter containing vesicles by exocytosis (vesicle fuses with the pre-synpatic membrane).

The neurotransmitter, acetylcholine(ACh) binds to the nicotinic receptors on the motor end plate, which is a specialised area of the muscle fibre's post-synaptic membrane. This binding causes the nicotinic receptor channels to open and allow the influx of Na^{+} into the muscle fibre.

Fifty percent of the released ACh is hydrolysed by acetylcholinesterase (AChE) and the remaining bind to the nicotinic receptors on the motor end plate. When ACh is degraded by AChE, the receptors are no longer stimulated and the muscle cannot be depolarized.

If enough Na^{+} enter the muscle fibre, it causes an increase in the membrane potential from its resting potential of -95mV to -50mV (above the threshold potential -55mV) which causes an action potential to spread throughout the fibre. This potential travels along the surface of the sarcolemma. The sarcolemma is an excitable membrane that surrounds the contractile structures known as myofibrils that are located deep in the muscle fibre. For the action potential to reach the myofibrils, the action potential travels along the transverse tubules (T-tubules) that connects the sarcolemma and center of the fibre.

Later, action potential reaches the sarcoplasmic reticulum which stores the Ca^{2+} needed for muscle contraction and causes Ca^{2+} to be released from the sarcoplasmic reticulum.

== Mechanism of action ==
Fig.1 A simple illustration of how two acetylcholine molecules bind to its receptive sites on the nicotinic receptor

Quaternary muscle relaxants bind to the nicotinic acetylcholine receptor and inhibit or interfere with the binding and effect of ACh to the receptor. Each ACh-receptor has two receptive sites and activation of the receptor requires binding to both of them. Each receptor site is located at one of the two α-subunits of the receptor. Each receptive site has two subsites, an anionic site that binds to the cationic ammonium head and a site that binds to the blocking agent by donating a hydrogen bond.

Non-depolarizing agents A decrease in binding of acetylcholine leads to a decrease in its effect and neuron transmission to the muscle is less likely to occur. It is generally accepted that non-depolarizing agents block by acting as reversible competitive inhibitors. That is, they bind to the receptor as antagonists and that leaves fewer receptors available for acetylcholine to bind.

Depolarizing agents Depolarizing agents produce their block by binding to and activating the ACh receptor, at first causing muscle contraction, then paralysis. They bind to the receptor and cause depolarization by opening channels just like acetylcholine does. This causes repetitive excitation that lasts longer than a normal acetylcholine excitation and is most likely explained by the resistance of depolarizing agents to the enzyme acetylcholinesterase. The constant depolarization and triggering of the receptors keeps the endplate resistant to activation by acetylcholine. Therefore, a normal neuron transmission to muscle cannot cause contraction of the muscle because the endplate is depolarized and thereby the muscle paralysed.

Binding to the nicotinic receptor Shorter molecules like acetylcholine need two molecules to activate the receptor, one at each receptive site. Decamethonium congeners, which prefer straight line conformations (their lowest energy state), usually span the two receptive sites with one molecule (binding inter-site). Longer congeners must bend when fitting receptive sites.

The greater energy a molecule needs to bend and fit usually results in lower potency.

== Structural and conformational action relationship ==
Conformational study on neuromuscular blocking drugs is relatively new and developing. Traditional SAR studies do not specify environmental factors on molecules. Computer-based conformational searches assume that the molecules are in vacuo, which is not the case in vivo. Solvation models take into account the effect of a solvent on the conformation of the molecule. However, no system of solvation can mimic the effect of the complex fluid composition of the body.

The division of muscle relaxants to rigid and non-rigid is at most qualitative. The energy required for conformational changes may give a more precise and quantitative picture. Energy required for reducing onium head distance in the longer muscle relaxant chains may quantify their ability to bend and fit its receptive sites. Using computers it is possible to calculate the lowest energy state conformer and thus most populated and best representing the molecule. This state is referred to as the global minimum. The global minimum for some simple molecules can be discovered quite easily with certainty. Such as for decamethonium the straight line conformer is clearly the lowest energy state. Some molecules, on the other hand, have many rotatable bonds and their global minimum can only be approximated.

=== Molecular length and rigidity ===
Fig.2 A simple illustration of how decamethonium binds to the nicotinic receptor. The onium heads bind to two separate subunits of the ion-channel

Neuromuscular blocking agents need to fit in a space close to 2 nanometres, which resembles the molecular length of decamethonium. Some molecules of decamethonium congeners may bind only to one receptive site. Flexible molecules have a greater chance of fitting receptive sites. However, the most populated conformation may not be the best-fitted one. Very flexible molecules are, in fact, weak neuromuscular inhibitors with flat dose-response curves. On the other hand, stiff or rigid molecules tend to fit well or not at all. If the lowest-energy conformation fits, the compound has high potency because there is a great concentration of molecules close to the lowest-energy conformation. Molecules can be thin but yet rigid. Decamethonium for example needs relatively high energy to change the N-N distance.

In general, molecular rigidity contributes to potency, while size affects whether a muscle relaxant shows a polarizing or a depolarizing effect. Cations must be able to flow through the trans-membrane tube of the ion-channel to depolarize the endplate. Small molecules may be rigid and potent but unable to occupy or block the area between the receptive sites. Large molecules, on the other hand, may bind to both receptive sites and hinder depolarizing cations independent of whether the ion-channel is open or closed below. Having a lipophilic surface pointed towards the synapse enhances this effect by repelling cations. The importance of this effect varies between different muscle relaxants and classifying depolarizing from non-depolarizing blocks is a complex issue. The onium heads are usually kept small and the chains connecting the heads usually keep the N-N distance at 10 N or O atoms. Keeping the distance in mind the structure of the chain can vary (double bonded, cyclohexyl, benzyl, etc.)

Succinylcholine has a 10-atom distance between its N atoms, like decamethonium. Yet it has been reported that it takes two molecules, as with acetylcholine, to open one nicotinic ion channel. The conformational explanation for this is that each acetylcholine moiety of succinylcholine prefers the gauche (bent, cis) state. The attraction between the N and O atoms is greater than the onium head repulsion. In this most populated state, the N-N distance is shorter than the optimal distance of ten carbon atoms and too short to occupy both receptive sites. This similarity between succinyl- and acetyl-choline also explains its acetylcholine-like side-effects. Comparing molecular lengths, the pachycurares dimethyltubocurarine and d-tubocurarine both are very rigid and measure close to 1.8 nm in total length. Pancuronium and vecuronium measure 1.9 nm, whereas pipecuronium is 2.1 nm. The potency of these compounds follows the same rank of order as their length. Likewise, the leptocurares prefer a similar length. Decamethonium, which measures 2 nm, is the most potent in its category, whereas C11 is slightly too long. Gallamine despite having low bulk and rigidity is the most potent in its class, and it measures 1.9 nm. Based on this information one can conclude that the optimum length for neuromuscular blocking agents, depolarizing or not, should be 2 to 2.1 nm.

The CAR for long-chain bisquaternary tetrahydroisoquinolines like atracurium, cisatracurium, mivacurium, and doxacurium is hard to determine because of their bulky onium heads and large number of rotatable bonds and groups. These agents must follow the same receptive topology as others, which means that they do not fit between the receptive sites without bending. Mivacurium for example has a molecular length of 3.6 nm when stretched out, far from the 2 to 2.1 nm optimum. Mivacurium, atracurium, and doxacurium have greater N-N distance and molecular length than d-tubocurarine even when bent. To make them fit, they have flexible connections that give their onium heads a chance to position themselves beneficially. This bent N-N scenario probably does not apply to laudexium and decamethylene bisatropium, which prefer a straight conformation.

=== Beers and Reich's law ===
It has been concluded that acetylcholine and related compounds must be in the gauche (bent) configuration when bound to the nicotinic receptor. Beers and Reich's studies on cholinergic receptors in 1970 showed a relationship affecting whether a compound was muscarinic or nicotinic. They showed that the distance from the centre of the quaternary N atom to the van der Waals extension of the respective O atom (or an equivalent H-bond acceptor) is a determining factor. If the distance is 0.44 nm, the compound shows muscarinic properties—and if the distance is 0.59 nm, nicotinic properties dominate.)

=== Rational design ===
Pancuronium remains one of the few muscle relaxants logically and rationally designed from structure-action / effects relationship data. A steroid skeleton was chosen because of its appropriate size and rigidness. Acetylcholine moieties were inserted to increase receptor affinity. Although having many unwanted side-effects, a slow onset of action and recovery rate it was a big success and at the time the most potent neuromuscular drug available. Pancuronium and some other neuromuscular blocking agents block M2-receptors and therefore affect the vagus nerve, leading to hypotension and tachycardia. This muscarinic blocking effect is related to the acetylcholine moiety on the A ring on pancuronium. Making the N atom on the A ring tertiary, the ring loses its acetylcholine moiety, and the resulting compound, vecuronium, has nearly 100 times less affinity to muscarin receptors while maintaining its nicotinic affinity and a similar duration of action. Vecuronium is, therefore, free from cardiovascular effects. The D ring shows excellent properties validating Beers and Reich's rule with great precision. As a result, vecuronium has the greatest potency and specificity of all mono-quaternary compounds.

=== Potency ===
Two functional groups contribute significantly to aminosteroidal neuromuscular blocking potency, it is presumed to enable them to bind the receptor at two points. A bis-quaternary two point arrangement on A and D-ring (binding inter-site) or a D-ring acetylcholine moiety (binding at two points intra-site) are most likely to succeed. A third group can have variable effects. The quaternary and acetyl groups on the A and D ring of pipecuronium prevent it from binding intra-site (binding to two points at the same site). Instead, it must bind as bis-quaternary (inter-site). These structures are very dissimilar from acetylcholine and free pipecuronium from nicotinic or muscarinic side-effects linked to acetylcholine moiety. Also, they protect the molecule from hydrolysis by cholinesterases, which explain its nature of kidney excretion. The four methyl-groups on the quaternary N atoms make it less lipophilic than most aminosteroids. This also affects pipecuroniums metabolism by resisting hepatic uptake, metabolism, and biliary excretion. The length of the molecule (2.1 nm, close to ideal) and its rigidness make pipecuronium the most potent and clean one-bulk bis-quaternary. Even though the N-N distance (1.6 nm) is far away from what is considered ideal, its onium heads are well-exposed, and the quaternary groups help to bring together the onium heads to the anionic centers of the receptors without chirality issues.

Adding more than two onium heads in general does not add to potency. Though the third onium head in gallamine seems to help position the two outside heads near the optimum molecular length, it can interfere unfavorably and gallamine turns out to be a weak muscle relaxant, like all multi-quaternary compounds. Considering acetylcholine a quaternizing group larger than methyl and an acyl group larger than acetyl would reduce the molecule's potency. The charged N and the carbonyl O atoms are distanced from structures they bind to on receptive sites and, thus, decrease potency. The carbonyl O in vecuronium for example is thrust outward to appose the H-bond donor of the receptive site. This also helps explain why gallamine, rocuronium, and rapacuronium are of relatively low potency. In general, methyl quaternization is optimal for potency but, opposing this rule, the trimethyl derivatives of gallamine are of lower potency than gallamine. The reason for this is that gallamine has a suboptimal N-N distance. Substituting the ethyl groups with methyl groups would make the molecular length also shorter than optimal. Methoxylation of tetrahydroisoquinolinium agents seems to improve their potency. How methoxylation improves potency is still unclear. Histamine release is a common attribute of benzylisoquinolinium muscle relaxants. This problem generally decreases with increased potency and smaller doses. The need for larger doses increases the degree of this side-effect. Conformational or structural explanations for histamine release are not clear.

== Pharmacokinetics ==
Metabolism and Hofmann elimination

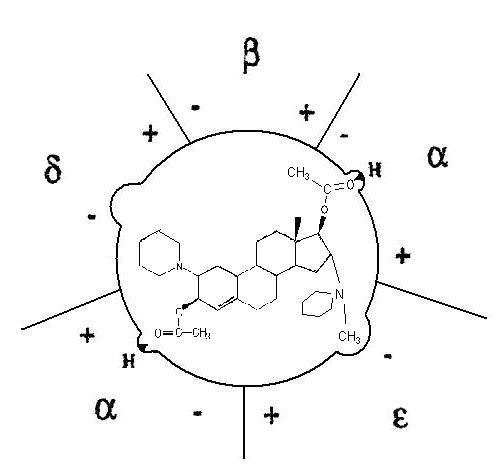
Fig.3 A simple illustration of how vecuronium binds to the nicotinic receptor. Its D-ring binds to the receptor at two points and the lipophillic side of the molecule repels cations from flowing through the ion-channel

Deacetylating vecuronium at position 3 results in a very active metabolite. In the case of rapacuronium the 3-deacylated metabolite is even more potent than rapacuronium. As long as the D-ring acetylcholine moiety is unchanged they retain their muscle relaxing effect. Mono-quaternary aminosteroids produced with deacylation in position 17 on the other hand are generally weak muscle relaxants. In the development of atracurium the main idea was to make use of Hofmann elimination of the muscle relaxant in vivo. When working with bisbenzyl-isoquinolinium types of molecules, inserting proper features into the molecule such as an appropriate electron withdrawing group then Hofmann elimination should occur at conditions in vivo. Atracurium, the resulting molecule, breaks down spontaneously in the body to inactive compounds and being especially useful in patients with kidney or liver failure. Cis-atracurium is very similar to atracurium except it is more potent and has a weaker tendency to cause histamine release.

Structure relations to onset time

The effect of structure on the onset of action is not very well known except that the time of onset appears inversely related to potency. In general mono-quaternary aminosteroids are faster than bis-quaternary compounds, which means they are also of lower potency. A possible explanation for this effect is that drug delivery and receptor binding are of a different timescale. Weaker muscle relaxants are given in larger doses so more molecules in the central compartment must diffuse into the effect compartment, which is the space within the mouth of the receptor, of the body. After delivery to the effect compartment then all molecules act quickly. Therapeutically this relationship is very inconvenient because low potency, often meaning low specificity can decrease the safety margin thus increasing the chances of side-effects. In addition, even though low potency usually accelerates onset of action, it does not guaranty a fast onset. Gallamine, for example, is weak and slow. When fast onset is necessary then succinylcholine or rocuronium are usually preferable.

Elimination

Muscle relaxants can have very different metabolic pathways and it is important that the drug does not accumulate if certain elimination pathways are not active, for example in kidney failure.

== Medical use ==
=== Endotracheal intubation ===
Administration of neuromuscular blocking agents (NMBAs) during anesthesia can facilitate endotracheal intubation. This can decrease the incidence of postintubation hoarseness and airway injury.

Short-acting neuromuscular blocking agents are chosen for endotracheal intubation for short procedures (< 30minutes), and neuromonitoring is required soon after intubation. Options include succinylcholine, rocuronium or vecuronium if sugammadex is available for rapid reversal block.

Any short or intermediate acting neuromuscular blocking agents can be applied for endotracheal intubation for long procedures (≥ 30 minutes). Options include succinylcholine, rocuronium, vecuronium, mivacurium, atracurium and cisatracurium. The choice among these NMBAs depends on availability, cost and patient parameters that affect drug metabolism.

Intraoperative relaxation can be maintained as necessary with additional dose of nondepolarizing NMBA.

Among all NMBAs, succinylcholine establishes the most stable and fastest intubating conditions, thus is considered as the preferred NMBA for rapid sequence induction and intubation (RSII). Alternatives for succinylcholine for RSII include high dose rocuronium (1.2 mg/kg which is a 4 X ED95 dose), or avoidance of NMBAs with a high dose remifentanil intubation.

=== Facilitation of surgery ===
Nondepolarizing NMBAs can be used to induce muscle relaxation that improves surgical conditions, including laparoscopic, robotic, abdominal and thoracic procedures. It can reduce patient movement, muscle tone, breathing or coughing against ventilator and allow lower insufflation pressure during laparoscopy. Administration of NMBAs should be individualized according to patient's parameters. However, many operations can be performed without the need to apply any NMBAs as adequate anesthesia during surgery can achieve many of the theoretical benefits of neuromuscular blockage.

=== Clinical parameters of neuromuscular blockade ===
- ED_{95}: dose of NMBA required to produce 95% suppression of muscle twitch response (e.g. adductor pollicis) in 50% of the population, with balanced anesthesia
- Clinical duration: difference in time between NMBA administration and 25% recovery from neuromuscular block
- Train-of-four (TOF) response: stimulated muscle twitch response in trains of four when stimuli are applied in a burst of four as opposed to a single stimulus (equal twitch depression seen with depolarizing and fading response with non-depolarizing NMDA)
- 25%-75% recovery index: an indicator of the rate of skeletal muscle recovery - essentially, the difference in time between the time to recovery to 25% and time to recovery to 75% of baseline value
- T_{4}:T_{1} ≥ 0.7: a 70% ratio of the fourth twitch to the first twitch in a TOF - provides a measure of the recovery of neuromuscular function
- T_{4}:T_{1} ≥ 0.9: a 90% ratio of the fourth twitch to the first twitch in a TOF - provides a measure of the full recovery of neuromuscular function

== Adverse effects ==
Since these drugs may cause paralysis of the diaphragm, mechanical ventilation should be at hand to provide respiration.

In addition, these drugs may exhibit cardiovascular effects, since they are not fully selective for the nicotinic receptor and hence may have effects on muscarinic receptors. If nicotinic receptors of the autonomic ganglia or adrenal medulla are blocked, these drugs may cause autonomic symptoms. Also, neuromuscular blockers may facilitate histamine release, which causes hypotension, flushing, and tachycardia.

Succinylcholine may also trigger malignant hyperthermia in rare cases in patients who may be susceptible.

In depolarizing the musculature, suxamethonium may trigger a transient release of large amounts of potassium from muscle fibers. This puts the patient at risk for life-threatening complications, such as hyperkalemia and cardiac arrhythmias. Other effects include myalgia, increased intragastric pressure, increased intraocular pressure, increased intracranial pressure, cardiac dysrhythmias (bradycardia is the most common type) and allergic reactions. As a result, it is contraindicated for patients with susceptibility to malignant hyperthermia, denervating conditions, major burns after 48 hours, and severe hyperkalemia.

For nondepolarizing NMBAs except vecuronium, pipecuronium, doxacurium, cisatracurium, rocuronium and rapacuronium, they produce certain extent of cardiovascular effect. Moreover, Tubocurarine can produce hypotension effect while Pancuronium can lead to moderate increase in heart rate and small increase in cardiac output with little or no increase in systemic vascular resistance, which is unique in nondepolarizing NMBAs.

Certain drugs such as aminoglycoside antibiotics and polymyxin and some fluoroquinolones also have neuromuscular blocking action as their side-effect.

== Interactions ==
Some drugs enhance or inhibit the response to NMBAs which require the dosage adjustment guided by monitoring.

=== Combination of NMBAs ===
In some clinical circumstances, succinylcholine may be administered before and after a nondepolarising NMBA or two different nondepolarising NMBAs are administered in sequence. Combining different NMBAs can result in different degrees of neuromuscular block and management should be guided with the use of a neuromuscular function monitor.

The administration of nondepolarising neuromuscular blocking agent has an antagonistic effect on the subsequent depolarising block induced by succinylcholine. If a nondepolarising NMBA is administered prior to succinycholine, the dose of succinylcholine must be increased.

The administration of succinylcholine on the subsequent administration of a nondepolarising neuromuscular block depends on the drug used. Studies have shown that administration of succinylcholien before a nondepolarising NMBA does not affect the potency of mivacurium or rocuronium. But for vecuronium and cisatracurium, it speeds up the onset, increases the potency and prolongs the duration of action.

Combining two nondepolarising NMBAs of the same chemical class (e.g. rocuronium and vecuronium) produces an additive effect, while combining two nondepolarising NMBAs of different chemical class (e.g. rocuronium and cisatracurium) produces a synergistic response.

=== Inhaled anesthetics ===
Inhaled anesthetics inhibit nicotinic acetylcholine receptors (nAChRs) and potentiate neuromuscular blockage with nondepolarising NMBAs. It depends on the type of volatile anesthetic (desflurane > sevoflurane > isoflurane > nitrous oxide), the concentration and the duration of exposure.

=== Antibiotics ===
Tetracycline, aminoglycosides, polymyxins and clindamycin potentiate neuromuscular blockage by inhibiting ACh release or desensitisation of post-synpatic nAChRs to ACh. This interaction happens mostly during maintenance of anesthesia. As antibiotics typically are given after a dose of NMBA, this interaction needs to be considered when re-dosing NMBA.

=== Anti-seizure drugs ===
Patients receiving chronic treatment are relatively resistant to non-depolarising NMBAs due to the accelerated clearance.

=== Lithium ===
Lithium is structurally similar to other cations such as sodium, potassium, magnesium and calcium, this causes lithium to activate potassium channels which inhibit neuromuscular transmission. Patients who take lithium can have a prolonged response to both depolarising and nondepolarising NMBAs.

=== Antidepressants ===
Sertraline and amitriptyline inhibit butyrylcholinesterase and cause prolonged paralysis. Mivacurium causes prolonged paralysis for patients chronically taking sertraline.

=== Local anesthetics (LAs) ===
LAs may enhance the effects of depolarisation and nondepolarising NMBAs through pre and post-synaptic interactions at the NMJ. It may result in blood levels high enough to potentiate NMBA-induced neuromuscular block. Epidurally administered levobupivacaine and mepivacaine potentiate amino-steroidal NMBAs and delay recovery from neuromuscular blockade.

== Estimating effect ==
Methods for estimating the degree of neuromuscular block include valuation of muscular response to stimuli from surface electrodes, such as in the train-of-four test, wherein four such stimuli are given in rapid succession. With no neuromuscular blockade, the resultant muscle contractions are of equal strength, but gradually decrease in case of neuromuscular blockade. It is recommended during use of continuous-infusion neuromuscular blocking agents in intensive care.

== Reversal ==
The effect of non-depolarizing neuromuscular-blocking drugs may be reversed with acetylcholinesterase inhibitors, neostigmine, and edrophonium, as commonly used examples. Of these, edrophonium has a faster onset of action than neostigmine, but it is unreliable when used to antagonize deep neuromuscular block. Acetylcholinesterase inhibitors increase the amount of acetylcholine in the neuromuscular junction, so a prerequisite for their effect is that the neuromuscular block is not complete, because in case every acetylcholine receptor is blocked then it does not matter how much acetylcholine is present.

Sugammadex is a newer drug for reversing neuromuscular block by rocuronium and vecuronium in general anaesthesia. It is the first selective relaxant binding agent (SRBA).

== History ==
Curare is a crude extract from certain South American plants in the genera Strychnos and Chondrodendron, originally brought to Europe by explorers such as Walter Raleigh Edward Bancroft, a chemist and physician in the 16th century brought samples of crude curare from South America back to the Old-World. The effect of curare was experimented with by Sir Benjamin Brodie when he injected small animals with curare, and found that the animals stopped breathing but could be kept alive by inflating their lungs with bellows. This observation led to the conclusion that curare can paralyse the respiratory muscles. It was also experimented by Charles Waterton in 1814 when he injected three donkeys with curare. The first donkey was injected in the shoulder and died afterward. The second donkey had a tourniquet applied to the foreleg and was injected distal to the tourniquet. The donkey lived while the tourniquet was in place but died after it was removed. The third donkey after injected with curare appeared to be dead but was resuscitated using bellows. Charles Waterton's experiment confirmed the paralytic effect of curare.

It was known in the 19th century to have a paralysing effect, due in part to the studies of scientists like Claude Bernard. D-tubocurarine a mono-quaternary alkaloid was isolated from Chondrodendron tomentosum in 1942, and it was shown to be the major constituent in curare responsible for producing the paralysing effect. At that time, it was known that curare and, therefore, d-tubocurarine worked at the neuromuscular junction. The isolation of tubocurarine and its marketing as the drug Intocostrin led to more research in the field of neuromuscular-blocking drugs. Scientists figured out that the potency of tubocurarine was related to the separation distance between the two quaternary ammonium heads.

Neurologist Walter Freeman learned about curare and suggested to Richard Gill, a patient suffering from multiple sclerosis, that he try using it. Gill brought 25 pounds of raw curare from Ecuador. The raw curare was then given to Squibb and Sons to derive an effective antidote to curare. In 1942, Oskar Wintersteiner and J.D. Dutcher (two scientists working for Squibb and Sons) isolated the alkaloid d-tubocurarine. Soon after, they developed a preparation of curare called Intocostrin.

At the same time in Montreal, Harold Randall Griffith and his resident Enid Johnson at the Homeopathic Hospital administered curare to a young patient undergoing appendectomy. This was the first use of NMBA as muscle relaxant in anesthesia.

The 1940s, 1950s and 1960s saw the rapid development of several synthetic NMBA. Gallamine was the first synthetic NMBA used clinically. Further research led to the development of synthesized molecules with different curariform effects, depending on the distance between the quaternary ammonium groups. One of the synthesized bis-quaternaries was decamethonium a 10-carbon bis-quaternary compound. Following research with decamethonium, scientists developed suxamethonium, which is a double acetylcholine molecule that was connected at the acetyl end. The discovery and development of suxamethonium lead to a Nobel Prize in medicine in 1957. Suxamethonium showed different blocking effect in that its effect was achieved more quickly and augmented a response in the muscle before block. Also, tubocurarine effects were known to be reversible by acetylcholinesterase inhibitors, whereas decamethonium and suxamethonium block were not reversible.

Another compound malouétine that was a bis-quaternary steroid was isolated from the plant Malouetia bequaertiana and showed curariform activity. This led to the synthetic drug pancuronium, a bis-quaternary steroid, and subsequently other drugs that had better pharmacological properties. Research on these molecules helped improve understanding of the physiology of neurons and receptors.

=== Outdated treatment ===
Gallamine triethiodide is originally developed for preventing muscle contractions during surgical procedures. However, it is no longer marketed in the United States according to the FDA orange book.

== See also ==
- Ganglionic blocker
- Cholinergic blocking drugs
