= Neuromuscular drug =

Drugs that alter the transmission of nerve impulses to muscles

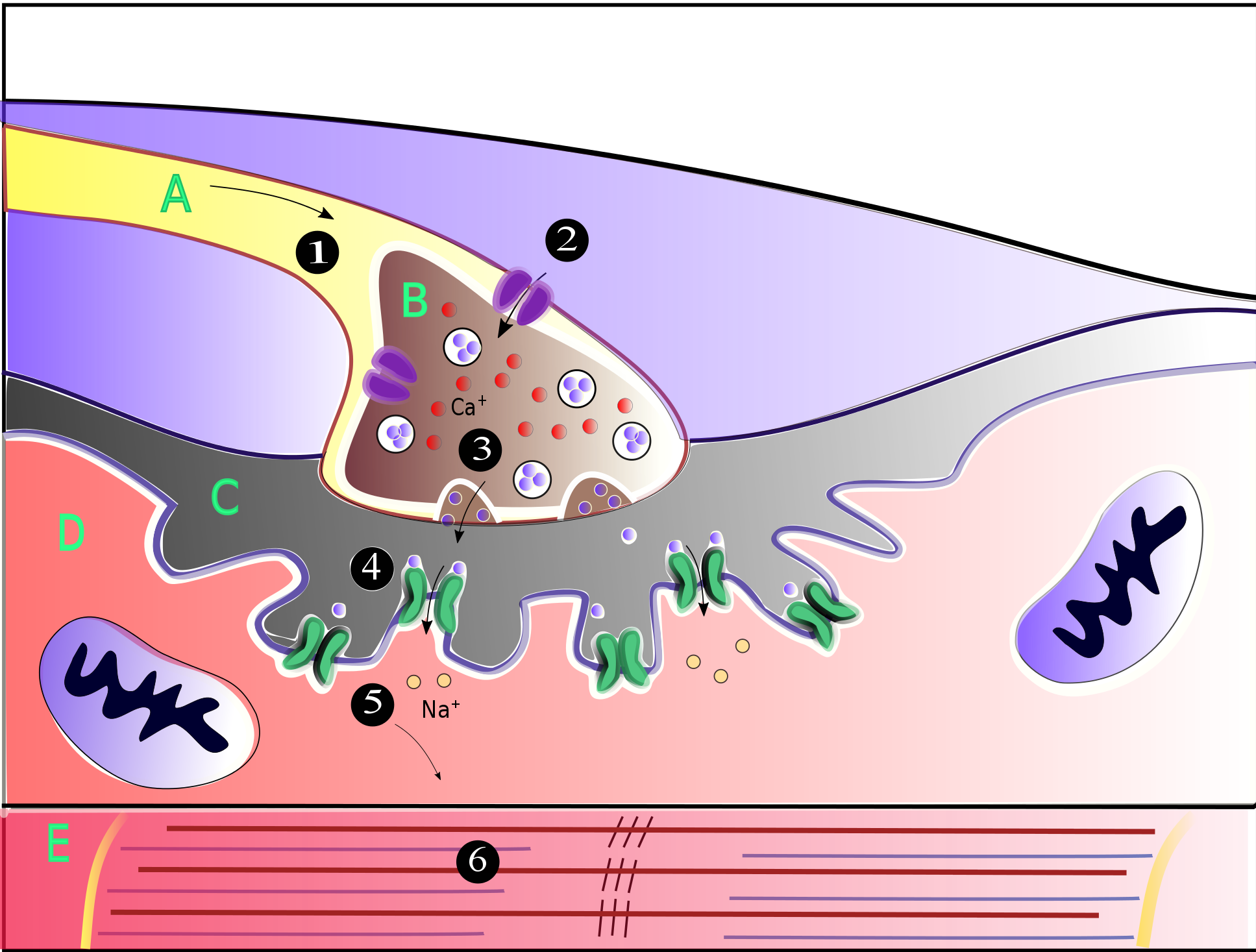
The neuromuscular junction

Neuromuscular drugs are chemical agents that are used to alter the transmission of nerve impulses to muscles, causing effects such as temporary paralysis of targeted skeletal muscles. Most neuromuscular drugs are available as quaternary ammonium compounds which are derived from acetylcholine (ACh). This allows neuromuscular drugs to act on multiple sites at neuromuscular junctions, mainly as antagonists or agonists of post-junctional nicotinic receptors. Neuromuscular drugs are classified into four main groups, depolarizing neuromuscular blockers, non-depolarizing neuromuscular blockers, acetylcholinesterase inhibitors, and butyrylcholinesterase inhibitors.

Clinically, neuromuscular drugs are used in anesthesia to cause paralysis of targeted skeletal muscles. It is most commonly applied in endotracheal intubation by reducing the incidence of hoarseness in vocal cords and esophageal injuries. It is also applied to improve surgical operating conditions by aiding mechanical ventilation in patients with lowered lung compliance. Other than surgical indications, neuromuscular drugs can also be indicated for the use of Alzheimer's disease, Parkinson's disease, etc. Common adverse effects of neuromuscular drugs include abnormal heart rate, blood pressure, and cardiac output.

== History ==
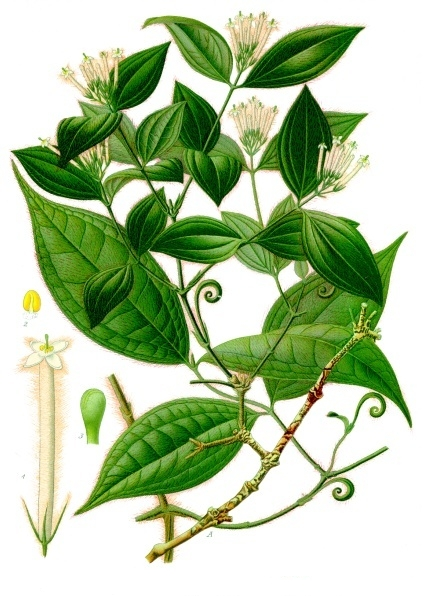
Curare, a plant containing paralyzing agents

Curare is an alkaloid poison extracted from native South American plants in the Chondrondendron genus. They were initially used by indigenous groups as a paralyzing agent for hunting. European scientists later discovered that tubocurarine was the major constituent responsible for the paralyzing effect by acting on the neuromuscular junction.

Anasthesiologists Harold Griffith and Enid Johnson first documented the successful use of curare, in a clinical trial to facilitate muscle relaxation in a healthy patient undergoing appendicectomy in 1942. Before the use of curare, anesthesiologist required large doses of anesthetic such as chloroform to achieve similar paralyzing effects, hence increased the risk of life-threatening effects in elderly patients who had cardiac complications. Ever since, neuromuscular agents have been commonly used in practice during anesthetic procedures. The clinical trial conducted by Griffith and Johnson also paved the way for discovery of many more neuromuscular drugs for surgical use.

== Classification ==
Neuromuscular blocking agents are classified into the following two groups:

Depolarizing neuromuscular blockers: Depolarizing neuromuscular blockers directly bind to postsynaptic cholinergic receptors of the neuromuscular junction to generate a sustained action potential. This causes prolonged stimulation and desensitization of neuroreceptors, causing skeletal muscle relaxation effects such as paralysis. Depolarizing neuromuscular blockers, notably succinylcholine, tend to be preferred over non-depolarizing neuromuscular blockers due to their long-acting and rapid-onset properties.

Non-depolarizing neuromuscular blockers: Non-depolarizing neuromuscular blockers directly bind to acetylcholine receptors on the postsynaptic neuron and does not cause depolarization of the neuromuscular junction. They act as competitive inhibitors to acetylcholine, blocking their binding to acetylcholine receptors on the postsynaptic membrane to inhibit membrane depolarization. Inhibition of neurotransmitter binding in the neuromuscular junction induces paralyzing effects. Compared to depolarizing neuromuscular blockers, non-depolarizing neuromuscular blockers tend to have slower onset times and shorter duration of actions.

Aside from neuromuscular blocking agents, acetylcholinesterase inhibitors and butyrylcholinesterase inhibitors act on the neuromuscular junction to enhance neurotransmitter transmission in voluntary and involuntary muscles. Additionally, some antibiotics, such as aminoglycosides, may also exert undesired side effects on the neuromuscular junction.

Acetylcholinesterase inhibitors: Acetylcholinesterase inhibitors prevent the degradation of acetylcholine, subsequently increasing its concentration and duration of action in the neuromuscular junction. Acetylcholinesterase inhibitors are primarily used to treat symptoms of dementia, Alzheimer's disease, Parkinson's disease, and myasthenia gravis.

Butyrylcholinesterase inhibitors: Butyrylcholinesterease inhibitors prevent the degradation of butyrylcholine, which increases its concentration and duration of action in the neuromuscular junction. Like acetylcholinesterase inhibitors, butyrylcholinesterase inhibitors are regarded as a therapeutic option for Alzheimer's disease.

Aminoglycosides: Aminoglycosides are frequently used in combinational antibacterial therapies for nosocomial respiratory tract infections, complicated intra-abdominal infections, sepsis, osteomyelitis caused by aerobic gram-negative bacilli, and complicated urinary tract infections. Seven neuromuscular drugs are approved by the US Food and Drug Administration, these drugs include: streptomycin, plazomicin, neomycin, amikacin, tobramycin, gentamicin, and paromomycin. It is clinically proven that aminoglycosides can exert neuromuscular blocking side effects. As aminoglycosides only have neuromuscular blocking side effects, they are not a major class of neuromuscular drugs.

== Mechanism of action ==
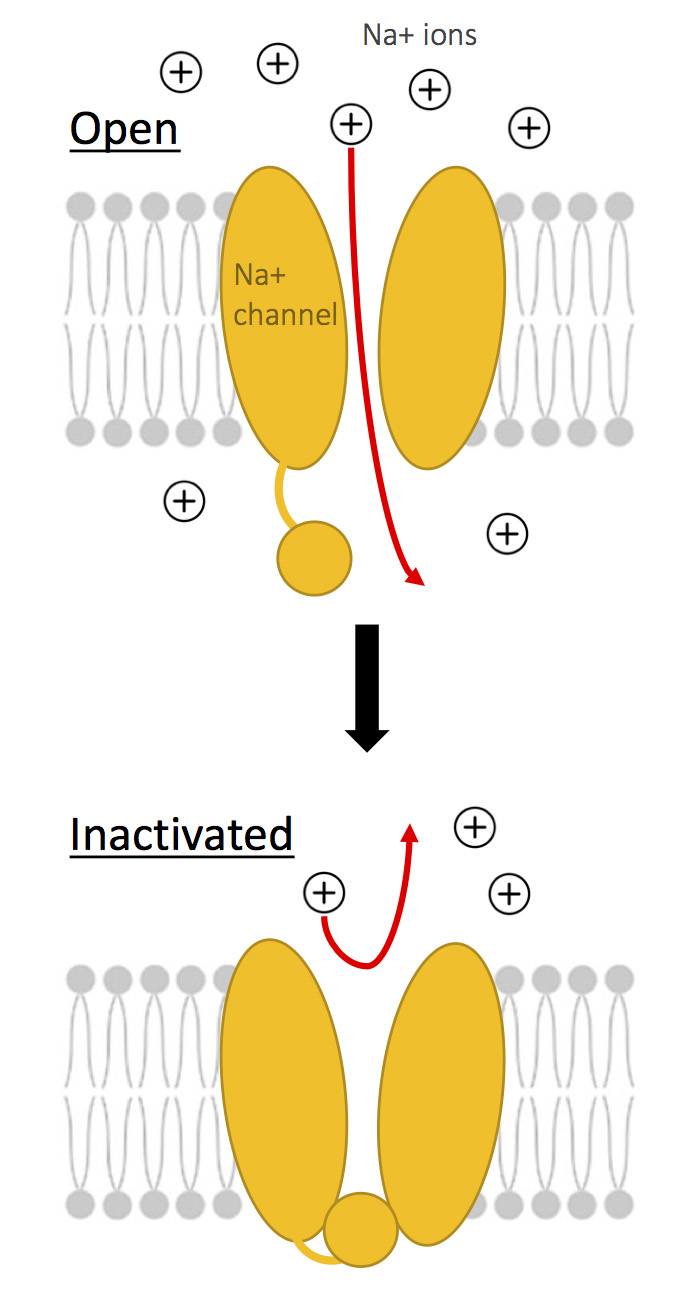
Diagram of open and closed state of sodium channel (Gate is voltage-activated, and is turned into the active state when surrounding membrane is depolarized by ion, resting state is reached when membrane repolarizes)

Depolarizing neuromuscular blockers: Depolarizing agents act as agonists for acetylcholine receptors. Succinylcholine is currently the only depolarizing neuromuscular blocking drug that has been placed in ongoing clinical use. Its pharmacological structure resembles two acetylcholine molecules combined through acetate methyl groups. It contains two quaternary ammonium radicals which associate with the two alpha subunits of the nicotinic receptor to cause depolarization. These nicotinic receptors respond to acetylcholine and are located in the central and peripheral nervous system, muscle, and other tissue. They act as the primary receptor in muscle for motor nerve-muscle communication which signals muscle contractions.

Under normal conditions, without the interference of depolarizing neuromuscular blockers, when depolarization is triggered, voltage-gated sodium channels are activated due to sensing the depolarization from the activation of acetylcholine receptors. This causes the rapid opening of the sodium channels, then closure after a brief period, becoming inactivated. The membrane potential is then required to be reset before the reactivation of the sodium channels. This process occurs almost instantly with acetylcholine, within one ms, as it is rapidly hydrolyzed through acetylcholinesterase.

However, when depolarizing neuromuscular blockers are applied, the modified structure of succinylcholine cannot be hydrolyzed by acetylcholinesterase. This causes the extensive activation of the nicotinic receptors and inactivation of the sodium channels, resulting in the blockage of the junctional transmission between muscles, causing the muscle to remain flaccid. Contrastingly, prolonged use of succinylcholine may cause a desensitization block to the neuromuscular junction, where acetylcholine receptors are insensitive to the channel opening effect of agonists (e.g., acetylcholine or acetylcholine-agonist drugs) (Refer to adverse reactions of depolarizing neuromuscular drugs below).

Binding site of nicotinic receptor (Succinylcholine binds to two alpha subunits of the nicotinic receptor)

Non-depolarizing neuromuscular blockers: Non-depolarizing agents act as competitive inhibitors for acetylcholine. Upon the binding of non-depolarizing neuromuscular blockers, neurotransmission is reduced. Consequently, depolarizing and muscle-contracting effects are decreased. Non-depolarizing neuromuscular blockers are generally reversible, and hence have no permanent effects on acetylcholine receptors.

Unlike depolarizing neuromuscular blockers, non-depolarizing drugs do not produce conformational changes to the receptor. The blockers bind to acetylcholine receptors through a dynamic mechanism, with repeated association and dissociation. Thus, as the concentration of antagonists increases, the concentration of binding subsequently increases. Effective neuromuscular block by non-depolarizing neuromuscular drugs occurs only when 70-80% of acetylcholine receptors are occupied by the drug. This is because at this occupancy rate, junctional potential cannot reach the threshold value required for muscle contraction.

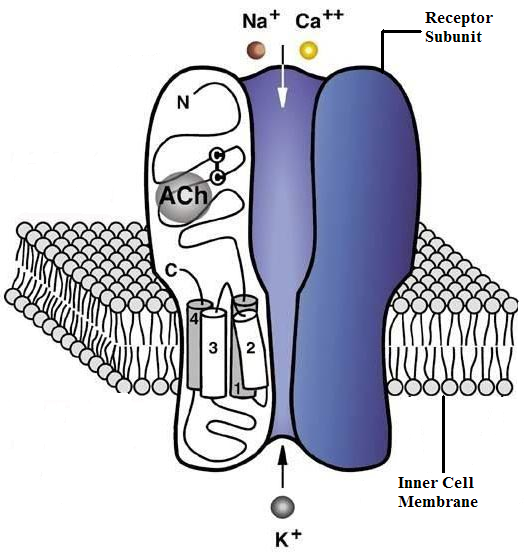
Diagram of nicotinic receptor (Acetylcholine receptor)

The main difference between the two major classes of neuromuscular blocking agents is their respective reversal process of paralyzing effects. Non-depolarizing blockers are reversed through acetylcholinesterase inhibitor drugs which increase the concentration of acetylcholine. Acetylcholine behaves as competitive antagonists on acetylcholine receptors, reducing the binding of non-depolarizing blockers. Whereas, depolarizing blockers that mimic acetylcholine would have increased pharmacological effects when administered alongside acetylcholinesterase inhibitors. Therefore, inhibition reversal for depolarizing neuromuscular blockers occurs naturally within a specific period, after half-life has been achieved.

Acetylcholinesterase and butyrylcholinesterase inhibitors: Both cholinesterase inhibitors share similar mechanisms of action. The active site of cholinesterase's consists of an anionic site and an esteric site.

Phosphorylation of the anionic site by cholinesterase inhibitors prevents the binding of acetylcholine on acetylcholinesterase and butyrylcholine on butyrylcholinesterase respectively. As a result, acetylcholine and butyrylcholine will accumulate in the neuromuscular junction.

== Pharmacokinetics ==
Depolarizing drug

Succinylcholine:

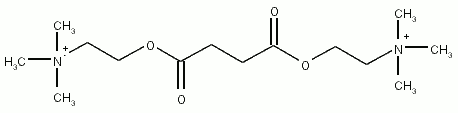
Succinylcholine chemical structure

The dosage of succinylcholine is patient-specific and determined based on total body weight and physical condition, thus extensive patient assessment and evaluation are required for accurate calculation. The current recommended dose of succinylcholine indicated for tracheal intubation by the FDA for adults is 1.0-1.5 mg/kg. Whereas, studies have shown that low-dose succinylcholine (0.45 mg/kg) is suitable for optimal intubation conditions in ASA 3 and 4 emergency non-prepared-patients (A patient with severe systemic disease that is a constant threat to life). This dosage can generate profound blockage within 60 seconds (short onset), quicker than other neuromuscular drugs currently available. Where neuromuscular blockage begins to recover within 3 minutes and is completely recovered within 15 minutes. Estimating the dose higher for intubation is preferred over underdosing, as reasonably higher dose produces similar paralysis with little to no known dose associated risks. Whereas under-dosing has shown inadequate paralysis, creating difficulties whilst performing intubation or other operative procedures.

Atracurium chemical structure

Non-depolarizing drug

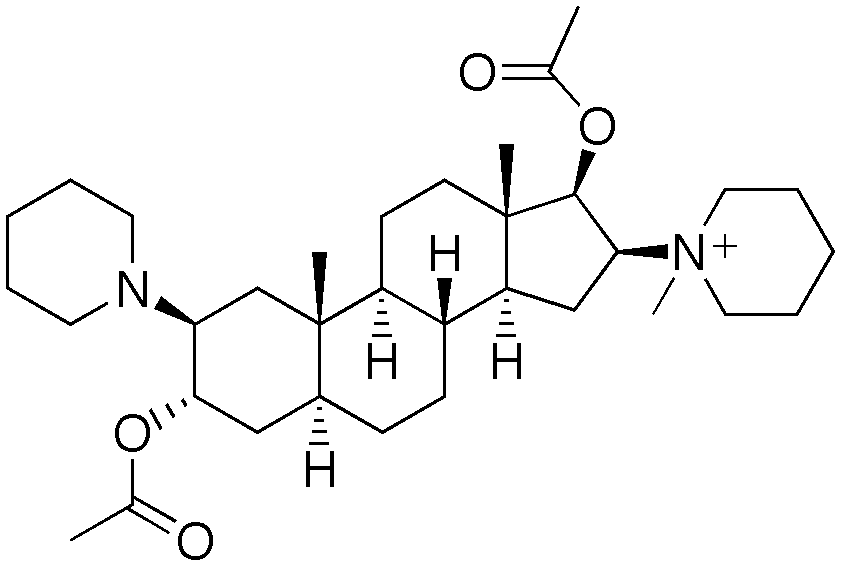
Vecuronium chemical structure

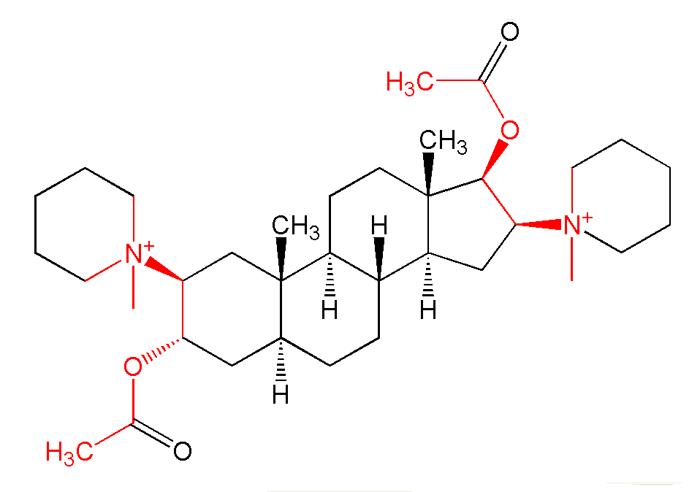
Pancuronium acetylcholine chemical structure

Non-depolarizing neuromuscular blockers are indicated in general anesthesia to facilitate endotracheal intubation, and to aid in surgeries via muscle relaxation. They can be further separated into two classes, benzylisoquinolinium compounds, and aminosteroid compounds.

Benzylisoquinolinium compounds, also known as benzylisoquinolines, have a structure of two quaternary ammonium groups linked by a chain of methyl groups. The methyl chain contains one or more chiral groups, leading to the existence of stereoisomers of benzylisoquinolinium drugs. Atracurirum, a bezylisoquinolinium drug, is commonly used in clinical settings.

Atracurium: The recommended clinical dosage of atracurium for adults is to "dose to effect" approach to ensure muscle relaxation. The drug has a relatively intermediate duration of action when compared to other non-depolarizing agents. The drug has an onset of 2 to 3 minutes in adults and an expected peak effect at 3 to 5 minutes. Recovery is expected to begin within 20 to 35 minutes of the initial dose, but it may take up to 70 minutes to achieve 95% recovery.

On the other hand, aminosteroid compounds have a structure based on androstane, with the addition of ACh-like groups. Vecuronium and pancuronium are the two most common aminosteroid compounds utilized in clinical settings.

Vecuronium and pancuronium: The recommended dosage of vecuronium and pancuronium both vary depending on interpatient variability. These drugs aim to achieve adequate muscle relaxation for surgical procedures to prevent surgical trauma. Vecuronium and pancuronium have an onset of 2 to 5 minutes in adults. The time it takes to recover 25% of neuromuscular control after vecuronium and pancuronium therapy are 25 to 40 minutes and 60 to 80 minutes respectively.

Acetylcholinesterase inhibitor

Donepezil chemical structure

Donepezil: Donepezil is a widely used acetylcholinesterase inhibitor indicated for Alzheimer's disease. The drug can be administered orally or with a transdermal patch. However, the estimated time to peak will differ between both routes of administration. Oral donepezil has a peak concentration time of 3 to 8 hours depending on the dosage, while transdermal donepezil has an expected time to peak at 7 days.

== Adverse effects ==
Depolarizing drug

Succinylcholine: Succinylcholine presents several undesirable side effects which affect its application as it interacts with both muscarinic and nicotinic receptors, due to its acetylcholine-mimicking properties.

Firstly, hyperkalemia is the most seen adverse effect of succinylcholine due to its stimulatory effect of the drug on skeletal muscles. This results in an increase in serum potassium levels as high as 0.5 mEq/L. This increase is clinically insignificant in normal patients but can be detrimental for patients with predisposed hyperkalemia caused by up-regulation of post-junctional acetylcholine receptors. Therefore, succinylcholine use is contraindicated for this category of patients. Further consideration is also required for patients with chronically elevated potassium or traumatic injuries, as there is a high probability of acute hyperkalemia which can lead to dysrhythmia or death.

Secondly, succinylcholine causes the activation of muscarinic receptors in the SA node, causing bradycardia. This effect is especially highlighted in use with patients with high vagal tone (traumatic or young patients). In adults with a normal vagal tone, bradycardia has only been reported on repeated incremental dosages of succinylcholine. Anticholinergic drugs such as atropine and glycopyrrolate can be used as secondary therapy in treating or prophylaxis of bradycardia.

Thirdly, succinylcholine use has been associated with postoperative myalgia, where patients often experience muscle pain similar to that of post-exercise muscle pain mainly in the shoulders, neck, neck and upper abdominal muscle the following day after surgery, especially in young healthy patients with greater muscle mass, whereas reports from children, elderly and pregnant woman are less frequent. This is caused by the fasciculations (muscle twitches) that appear in sites such as intercostal muscles, and the diaphragm. These fasciculations are not relieved through analgesics, and in common practice, a sub-paralyzing dose of non-depolarizing neuromuscular blocker is administered a few minutes before succinylcholine administration to reduce visible fasciculation and postoperative myalgia. The use of succinylcholine is therefore also contraindicated in patient with muscle myopathy within 24 to 72 hours post-administration.

Non-depolarizing drug

Atracurium: Atracurium is commonly associated with histamine-related symptoms, most notably flushing and erythema. Less commonly seen adverse effects include urticaria, hypotension, wheezing, tachycardia, bronchospasm, dyspnea, bradycardia, and laryngospasm. Moreover, drops of up to 30 mmHg in mean arterial pressure was also observed within two minutes of administration in some patients. H1 and H2 receptor blocking agents can be used to attenuate the drop in mean arterial pressure. A slow injection speed between 30 and 60 seconds reduces adverse effects. Furthermore, Atracium produces a toxic metabolite called laudanosine when administered and can accumulate in patients with impaired renal function. This may lead to potential seizures and epilepsy. Thus, the dosage of the atracium should be compensated for patients with decreased renal functions.

Vecuronium: Most of vecuronium's adverse effects is correlated to the drug's extension of pharmacological effects past the desired time of use. Serious adverse effects include bronchospasm, anaphylaxis, apnea, and prolonged paralysis. In some instances, hypersensitivity-associated histamine release may occur, leading to allergy-like symptoms or severe anaphylaxis in rare cases. Vecuronium has a relatively favourable safety profile when compared to pancuronium or other aminosteroid non-depolarizing drugs.

Pancuronium: Pancuronium produces more significant adverse effects due to the blockade of muscarinic M2 receptors in the atria. Therefore, pancuronium may increase cardiac output, mean arterial pressure, and heart rate. To add on, patients with renal failure may experience a 30-50% decrease in plasma clearance, hence an increase in neuromuscular blockade duration. The use of pancuronium with insufficient anesthetic agents leads to morbidity and psychological trauma.

Acetylcholinesterase inhibitor

Donepezil: Donepezil may exhibit cardiac issues such as hypertension, cardiac arrhythmia, atrioventricular block, and bradycardia due to its vagotonia properties. Common gastrointestinal side effects such as nausea, diarrhea, and vomiting are also associated with donepezil and other acetylcholinesterase inhibitors. Studies have also shown an association of donepezil use and nightmares due to increased activation of the visual cortex during sleep. Patients can be advised to complete their drug regimen in the morning to prevent occurrences of nightmares.
