= Dimethyltubocurarine chloride =

Chemical compound

Clinical data
- Other names: (+)-O,O'-dimethyl-tubocurine dichloride
- ATC code: M03AA04 (WHO)

Identifiers
- IUPAC name: (1S,16R)-9,10,21,25-Tetramethoxy-15,15,30,30-tetramethyl-7,23-dioxa-15,30-diazaheptacyclo[22.6.2.2^{3,6}.1^{8,12}.1^{18,22}.0^{27,31}.0^{16,34}]hexatriaconta-3,5,8(34),9,11,18(33),19,21,24,26,31,35-dodecaene-15,30-diium dichloride
- CAS Number: 33335-58-9
- PubChem CID: 71931
- DrugBank: DB00416
- ChemSpider: 64941
- UNII: 15BE4G33H2
- CompTox Dashboard (EPA): DTXSID10954969
- ECHA InfoCard: 100.046.768

Chemical and physical data
- Formula: C_{40}H_{48}Cl_{2}N_{2}O_{6}
- Molar mass: 723.73 g·mol^{−1}
- 3D model (JSmol)
- SMILES: C[N+]1(CCc2cc(c3cc2[C@@H]1Cc4ccc(cc4)Oc5c6c(cc(c5OC)OC)CC[N+]([C@@H]6Cc7ccc(c(c7)O3)OC)(C)C)OC)C.[Cl-].[Cl-]
- InChI: InChI=1S/C40H48N2O6.2ClH/c1-41(2)17-15-27-22-34(44-6)36-24-30(27)31(41)19-25-9-12-29(13-10-25)47-40-38-28(23-37(45-7)39(40)46-8)16-18-42(3,4)32(38)20-26-11-14-33(43-5)35(21-26)48-36;;/h9-14,21-24,31-32H,15-20H2,1-8H3;2*1H/q+2;;/p-2/t31-,32+;;/m0../s1; Key:IRPSJVWFSWAZSZ-OIUSMDOTSA-L

Dimethyltubocurarine chloride (INN; also known as metocurine chloride (USAN) is a non-depolarizing nicotinic acetylcholine receptor antagonist used as a muscle relaxant.
