= Doxacurium chloride =

Pharmaceutical drug

Clinical data
- Routes of administration: IV only
- ATC code: M03AC07 (WHO)

Legal status
- Legal status: In general: ℞ (Prescription only)

Identifiers
- IUPAC name: Bis[3-[6,7,8-trimethoxy-2-methyl-1- [(3,4,5-trimethoxyphenyl)methyl]- 3,4-dihydro-1H- isoquinolin-2-yl] propyl] butanedioate dichloride
- CAS Number: 83348-52-1
- PubChem CID: 5284551
- DrugBank: DB01135
- ChemSpider: 4447606
- UNII: M78TVM3G5Z
- KEGG: D00760
- ChEBI: CHEBI:59819
- ChEMBL: ChEMBL1200753
- CompTox Dashboard (EPA): DTXSID7022962

Chemical and physical data
- Formula: C_{56}H_{78}Cl_{2}N_{2}O_{16}
- Molar mass: 1106.14 g·mol^{−1}
- 3D model (JSmol): Interactive image
- SMILES: [Cl-].[Cl-].O=C(OCCC[N@+]2(C)[C@H](c1c(OC)c(OC)c(OC)cc1CC2)Cc3cc(OC)c(OC)c(OC)c3)CCC(=O)OCCC[N@+]5([C@@H](c4c(cc(OC)c(OC)c4OC)CC5)Cc6cc(OC)c(OC)c(OC)c6)C
- InChI: InChI=1S/C56H78N2O16.2ClH/c1-57(23-19-37-33-45(65-7)53(69-11)55(71-13)49(37)39(57)27-35-29-41(61-3)51(67-9)42(30-35)62-4)21-15-25-73-47(59)17-18-48(60)74-26-16-22-58(2)24-20-38-34-46(66-8)54(70-12)56(72-14)50(38)40(58)28-36-31-43(63-5)52(68-10)44(32-36)64-6;;/h29-34,39-40H,15-28H2,1-14H3;2*1H/q+2;;/p-2/t39-,40+,57-,58+;; Key:APADFLLAXHIMFU-LGIHQUBZSA-L

Doxacurium chloride (formerly recognized as BW938U80 or BW A938U) is a neuromuscular-blocking drug or skeletal muscle relaxant in the category of non-depolarizing neuromuscular-blocking drugs, used adjunctively in anesthesia to provide skeletal muscle relaxation during surgery or mechanical ventilation. Unlike a number of other related skeletal muscle relaxants, it is rarely used adjunctively to facilitate endotracheal intubation.

== Chemistry ==
Doxacurium is a symmetrical molecule because it is a diester of succinic acid.

The pharmacological action of doxacurium is a function of its competitive antagonism to acetylcholine receptors of the nicotinic type. The drug is marketed worldwide under the tradename of Nuromax, and it is classified as a long-duration non-depolarizing neuromuscular blocking agent in a class of compounds commonly and most erroneously referred to as "benzylisoquinolines" when, in fact, it is a bisbenzyltetrahydroisoquinolinium agent. The pharmaceutical preparation comprises the three trans-trans isomers (a meso structure R,S-S,R-doxacurium and an enantiomeric pair R,S-R,S-doxacurium and S,R-S,R-doxacurium)

== Availability ==
Doxacurium is available worldwide although, for a number of years, its use has not been popular because of considerably long duration of action. Its decline from clinical use was even further hastened when the sister molecule, mivacurium chloride, was introduced into the clinic very shortly after doxacurium's debut. The only perceived advantage of doxacurium over that of mivacurium is its superior cardiovascular profile, with particular reference to the lack of histamine release when administered as a rapid bolus dose.

== History ==
Doxacurium represents the second generation of tetrahydroisoquinolinium neuromuscular blocking drugs in a long lineage of nicotinic acetylcholine receptor antagonists synthesized by Mary M. Jackson and James C. Wisowaty, PhD (both chemists within the Chemical Development Laboratories at Burroughs Wellcome Co., Research Triangle Park, NC) in collaboration with John J. Savarese MD (who at the time was an anesthesiologist in the Dept. of Anesthesia, Harvard Medical School at the Massachusetts General Hospital, Boston, MA). Specifically, doxacurium was first synthesized in 1980. Early structure-activity studies had confirmed that the bulky nature of the "benzylisoquinolinium" entity provided a non-depolarizing mechanism of action. Partial saturation of the benzylisoquinoline ring to the tetrahydroisoquinoline ring provided an even further increase in potency of the molecules without detrimental effects to other pharmacological properties: this key finding led to the rapid adoption of the tetrahydroisoquinolinium structures as a standard building block (along with a 1-benzyl attachment), and it is the primary reason why the continued unwarranted reference to "benzylisoquinolinium" is a complete misnomer for all clinically introduced and currently used neuromuscular blocking agents in this class because they are all, in fact, tetrahydroisoquinoline derivatives. By definition, therefore, there has never been, in the history of clinical anesthetic practice, the use of a benzylisoquinoline neuromuscular blocking agent.

The heritages of doxacurium and mivacurium hark back to the synthesis of numerous compounds following structure-activity relationships that drove researchers to find the ideal replacement for succinylcholine (suxamethonium). Both doxacurium and mivacurium are descendants of early vigorous attempts to synthesize potent non-depolarizing agents with pharmacophoric elements derived from cross-combinations of the non-depolarizing agent, laudexium, and the well-known depolarizing agent, succinylcholine (suxamethonium). Ironically, laudexium itself was invented by a cross-combination between the prototypical non-depolarizing agent, d-tubocurarine and the depolarizing agent, decamethonium. In the 1950s and 1960s, the present-day concept of a neuromuscular blocking agent with a rapid onset and an ultra-short duration of action had not taken root: researchers and clinicians were still on the quest for potent but non-depolarizing replacements devoid of the histamine release and the dreaded "recurarizing" effects seen with tubocurarine and, more importantly, the absence of a depolarizing mechanism of action as seen with succinylcholine and decamethonium.
