= Metocurine =

Chemical compound

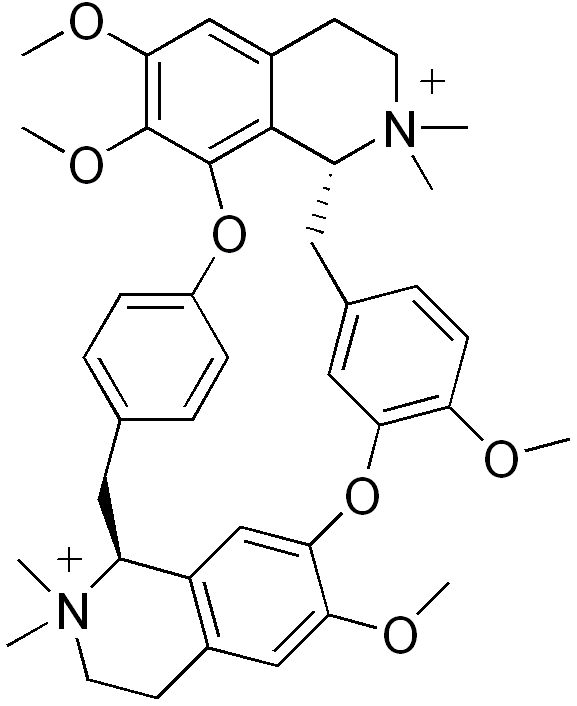

Identifiers
- IUPAC name: (1β)-6,6',7',12'-tetramethoxy-2,2,2',2'-tetramethyltubocuraran-2,2'-diium
- CAS Number: 5152-30-7
- PubChem CID: 21233
- DrugBank: DB01336
- ChemSpider: 19961
- UNII: V0M92G2U26
- KEGG: C07919
- ChEMBL: ChEMBL1259
- CompTox Dashboard (EPA): DTXSID0048262

Chemical and physical data
- Formula: C_{40}H_{48}N_{2}O_{6}
- Molar mass: 652.832 g·mol^{−1}
- 3D model (JSmol): Interactive image
- SMILES: C[N+]1(CCC2=CC(=C3C=C2[C@@H]1CC4=CC=C(C=C4)OC5=C6[C@@H](CC7=CC(=C(C=C7)OC)O3)[N+](CCC6=CC(=C5OC)OC)(C)C)OC)C

Metocurine is a muscle relaxant through neuromuscular blockade. It is excreted entirely through the kidneys and therefore should not be used in patients with kidney failure.
