= Gallamine triethiodide =

Muscle relaxant

Clinical data
- Trade names: Flaxedil
- AHFS/Drugs.com: International Drug Names
- ATC code: M03AC02 (WHO)

Identifiers
- IUPAC name: 2,2’,2’’-[benzene-1,2,3-triyltris(oxy)]tris(N,N,N-triethylethanaminium) triiodide
- CAS Number: 65-29-2
- PubChem CID: 6172
- IUPHAR/BPS: 356
- DrugBank: DB00483
- ChemSpider: 5937
- UNII: Q3254X40X2
- KEGG: D02292
- ChEBI: CHEBI:503442
- ChEMBL: ChEMBL1200993

Chemical and physical data
- Formula: C_{30}H_{60}N_{3}O_{3}^{+3} · 3 I^{−} (gallamine triethiodide); C_{24}H_{45}N_{3}O_{3} (gallamine)
- Molar mass: 891.529 g/mol (gallamine triethiodide); 423.633 g/mol (gallamine)
- 3D model (JSmol): Interactive image
- SMILES: [I-].[I-].[I-].O(c1c(OCC[N+](CC)(CC)CC)cccc1OCC[N+](CC)(CC)CC)CC[N+](CC)(CC)CC
- InChI: InChI=1S/C24H45N3O3/c1-7-25(8-2)16-19-28-22-14-13-15-23(29-20-17-26(9-3)10-4)24(22)30-21-18-27(11-5)12-6/h13-15H,7-12,16-21H2,1-6H3; Key:ICLWTJIMXVISSR-UHFFFAOYSA-N

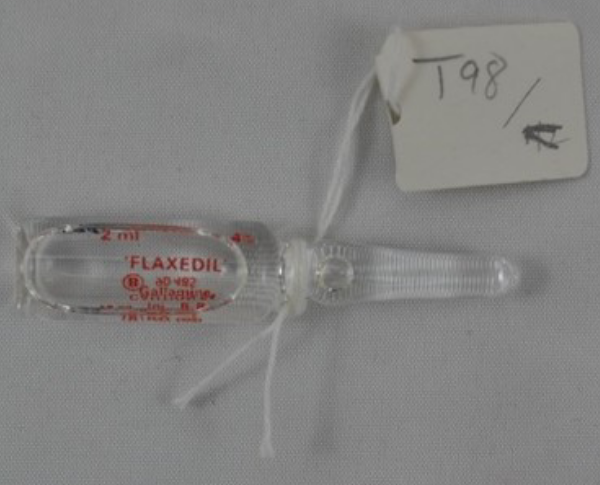
An ampoule of gallamine.

Gallamine triethiodide (Flaxedil) is a non-depolarising muscle relaxant. It acts by combining with the cholinergic receptor sites in muscle and competitively blocking the transmitter action of acetylcholine. Gallamine is a non-depolarising type of blocker as it binds to the acetylcholine receptor but does not have the biological activity of acetyl choline. Gallamine triethiodide has a parasympatholytic effect on the cardiac vagus nerve, which causes tachycardia and occasionally hypertension. Very high doses cause histamine release.. Presence of iodine in the triethiodide salt makes it radio opaque.

Gallamine triethiodide was commonly used to prevent muscle contractions during surgical procedures, but is now superseded by new neuromuscular blocking drugs with fewer side effects.

It was developed by Daniel Bovet in 1947.

The drug is no longer marketed in the United States, according to the FDA Orange Book.

== See also ==
- Neuromuscular-blocking drug
- Curare
