= Rapacuronium bromide =

Pharmaceutical drug

- Rapacuronium bromide

Clinical data
- Other names: [(2S, 3S, 5S, 8R, 9S, 10S, 13S, 14S, 16S, 17S)-3-acetyloxy-10,13-dimethyl-2-(1-piperidyl)-16-(1-prop-2-enyl-3,4,5,6-tetrahydro-2H-pyridin-1-yl)-2 ,3 ,4 ,5 ,6 ,7 ,8 ,9 ,11 ,12 ,14, 15, 16, 17-tetradecahydro-1H-cyclopenta[a]phenanthren-17-yl]propanoate
- Routes of administration: Intravenous
- ATC code: none

Legal status
- Legal status: US: Withdrawn

Pharmacokinetic data
- Bioavailability: Not applicable
- Protein binding: Variable
- Metabolism: Hydrolyzed to active metabolites CYP system not involved
- Elimination half-life: 141 minutes (mean)
- Excretion: Renal and fecal

Identifiers
- IUPAC name: (2β,3α,5α,16β,17β)-3-(acetyloxy)-16-(1-allylpiperidinium-1-yl)-2-piperidin-1-yl-17-(propionyloxy)androstane bromide
- CAS Number: 156137-99-4
- PubChem CID: 5311398
- DrugBank: DB04834
- ChemSpider: 4470889
- UNII: 65Q4QDG4KC
- ChEMBL: ChEMBL1201352
- CompTox Dashboard (EPA): DTXSID7048823
- ECHA InfoCard: 100.211.226

Chemical and physical data
- Formula: C_{37}H_{61}N_{2}O_{4}^{+}
- Molar mass: 597.905 g·mol^{−1}
- 3D model (JSmol): Interactive image
- SMILES: [Br-].O=C(O[C@H]6[C@@H]([N+]1(C\C=C)CCCCC1)C[C@@H]5[C@]6(C)CC[C@H]3[C@H]5CC[C@H]4C[C@H](OC(=O)C)[C@@H](N2CCCCC2)C[C@]34C)CC
- InChI: InChI=1S/C37H61N2O4.BrH/c1-6-20-39(21-12-9-13-22-39)32-24-30-28-15-14-27-23-33(42-26(3)40)31(38-18-10-8-11-19-38)25-37(27,5)29(28)16-17-36(30,4)35(32)43-34(41)7-2;/h6,27-33,35H,1,7-25H2,2-5H3;1H/q+1;/p-1/t27-,28+,29-,30-,31-,32-,33-,35-,36-,37-;/m0./s1; Key:LVQTUXZKLGXYIU-GWSNJHLMSA-M

Rapacuronium bromide (brand name Raplon) is a rapidly acting, non-depolarizing aminosteroid neuromuscular blocker formerly used in modern anaesthesia, to aid and enable endotracheal intubation, which is often necessary to assist in the controlled ventilation of unconscious patients during surgery and sometimes in intensive care. As a non-depolarizing agent it did not cause initial stimulation of muscles before weakening them.

Due to risk of fatal bronchospasm it was withdrawn from the United States market by Organon on March 27, 2001, less than two years after its FDA approval in 1999.
