= Laudexium metilsulfate =

Chemical compound

Clinical data
- Other names: Laudolissin
- Routes of administration: IV

Legal status
- Legal status: discontinued from clinical use

Pharmacokinetic data
- Bioavailability: 100% (IV)

Identifiers
- IUPAC name: 1-[(3,4-Dimethoxyphenyl)methyl]-2-[10-[1-[(3,4-dimethoxyphenyl)methyl]-6,7-dimethoxy-2-methyl-3,4-dihydro-1H-isoquinolin-2-ium-2-yl]decyl]-6,7-dimethoxy-2-methyl-3,4-dihydro-1H-isoquinolin-2-ium methyl sulfate
- CAS Number: 3253-60-9
- PubChem CID: 18618
- ChemSpider: 17584
- UNII: D067KDG4NU
- CompTox Dashboard (EPA): DTXSID301029355

Chemical and physical data
- Formula: C_{54}H_{80}N_{2}O_{16}S_{2}
- Molar mass: 1077.35 g·mol^{−1}
- 3D model (JSmol): Interactive image
- SMILES: C[N+]1(CCC2=CC(=C(C=C2C1CC3=CC(=C(C=C3)OC)OC)OC)OC)CCCCCCCCCC[N+]4(CCC5=CC(=C(C=C5C4CC6=CC(=C(C=C6)OC)OC)OC)OC)C.COS(=O)(=O)[O-].COS(=O)(=O)[O-]
- InChI: InChI=1S/C52H74N2O8.2CH4O4S/c1-53(27-23-39-33-49(59-7)51(61-9)35-41(39)43(53)29-37-19-21-45(55-3)47(31-37)57-5)25-17-15-13-11-12-14-16-18-26-54(2)28-24-40-34-50(60-8)52(62-10)36-42(40)44(54)30-38-20-22-46(56-4)48(32-38)58-6;2*1-5-6(2,3)4/h19-22,31-36,43-44H,11-18,23-30H2,1-10H3;2*1H3,(H,2,3,4)/q+2;;/p-2; Key:LADQAYSLFLCKOD-UHFFFAOYSA-L

Laudexium metilsulfate is a neuromuscular blocking drug or skeletal muscle relaxant in the category of non-depolarizing neuromuscular-blocking drugs, used adjunctively in surgical anesthesia to facilitate endotracheal intubation and to provide skeletal muscle relaxation during surgery or mechanical ventilation.

Laudexium is no longer used in clinical practice, though it was introduced clinically in the early 1950s. It has about half the potency, a slower onset of action and a duration of action much longer than that of d-tubocurarine. As with all clinically established (as well as experimental agents) with a non-depolarizing mechanism of action, its pharmacological action can be antagonized by anticholinesterases.

The displacement of laudexium from clinical use was assured owing to recurrent reports of significant post-operative re-curarization.
