= Pipecuronium bromide =

Chemical compound

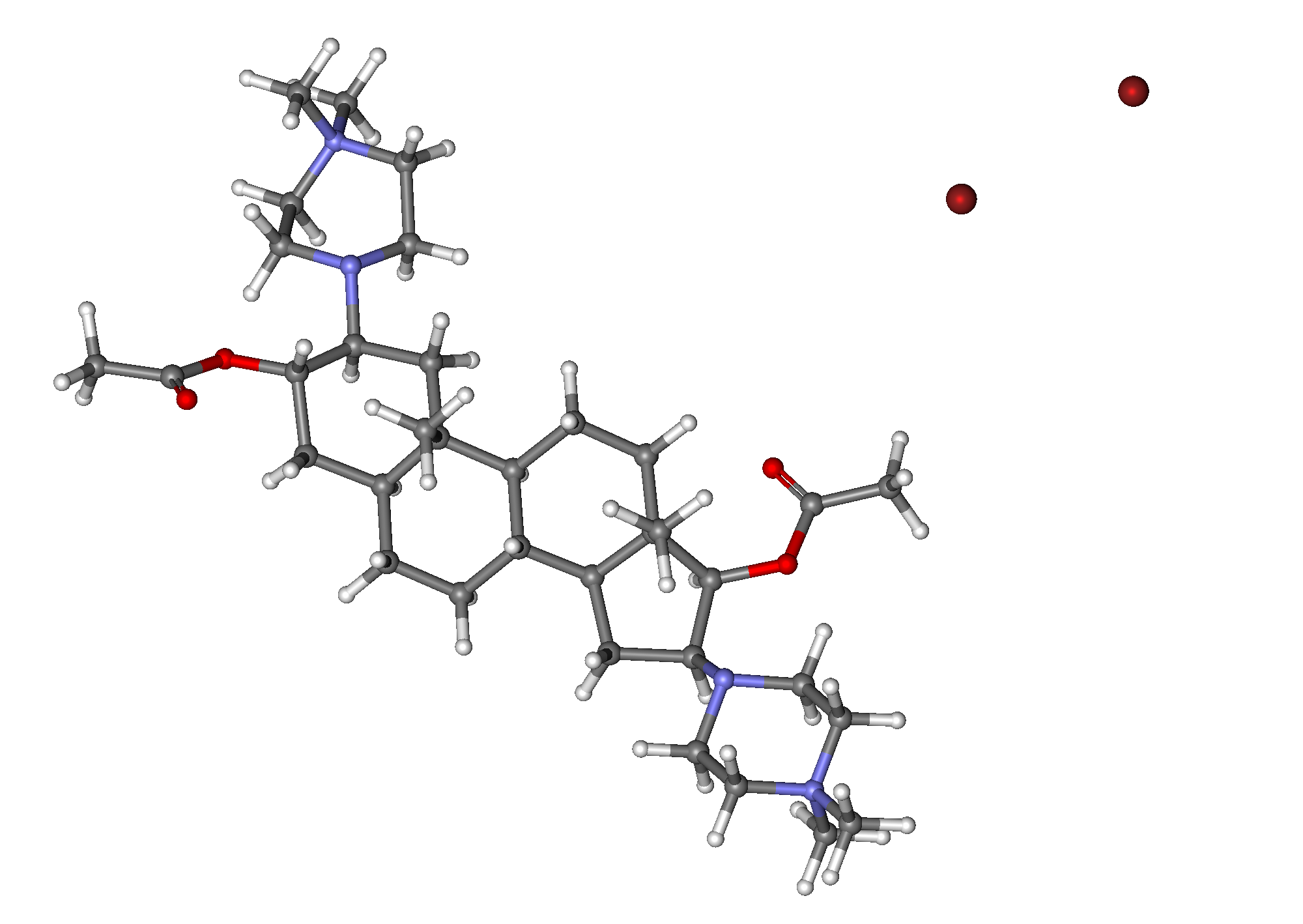

Clinical data
- Trade names: Arduan
- AHFS/Drugs.com: International Drug Names
- ATC code: M03AC06 (WHO)

Identifiers
- IUPAC name: (2β,3α,5α,16β,17β)-3,17-bis(acetyloxy)-2,16-bis(4,4-dimethylpiperazin-4-ium-1-yl)androstane dibromide
- CAS Number: 52212-02-9 68399-58-6
- PubChem CID: 65332
- ChemSpider: 58815
- UNII: R6ZTY81RE1
- KEGG: D00764
- ChEMBL: ChEMBL1200722
- CompTox Dashboard (EPA): DTXSID8023478
- ECHA InfoCard: 100.052.475

Chemical and physical data
- Formula: C_{35}H_{62}Br_{2}N_{4}O_{4}
- Molar mass: 762.713 g·mol^{−1}
- 3D model (JSmol): Interactive image
- SMILES: [Br-].[Br-].O=C(O[C@H]6[C@@H](N1CC[N+](C)(C)CC1)C[C@@H]5[C@]6(C)CC[C@H]3[C@H]5CC[C@H]4C[C@H](OC(=O)C)[C@@H](N2CC[N+](CC2)(C)C)C[C@]34C)C
- InChI: InChI=1S/C35H62N4O4.2BrH/c1-24(40)42-32-21-26-9-10-27-28(35(26,4)23-31(32)37-15-19-39(7,8)20-16-37)11-12-34(3)29(27)22-30(33(34)43-25(2)41)36-13-17-38(5,6)18-14-36;;/h26-33H,9-23H2,1-8H3;2*1H/q+2;;/p-2/t26-,27+,28-,29-,30-,31-,32-,33-,34-,35-;;/m0../s1; Key:TXWBOBJCRVVBJF-YTGGZNJNSA-L

Pipecuronium (Arduan) is a bisquaternary aminosteroid muscle relaxant which blocks nicotinic acetylcholine receptors at the neuromuscular junction. It is also an antagonist of M2 and M3 muscarinic receptors and is the most potent neuromuscular blocking agent of the aminosteroid class.

It is sold under the trade names Arduan and Pycuron.

== See also ==
- Pancuronium bromide
