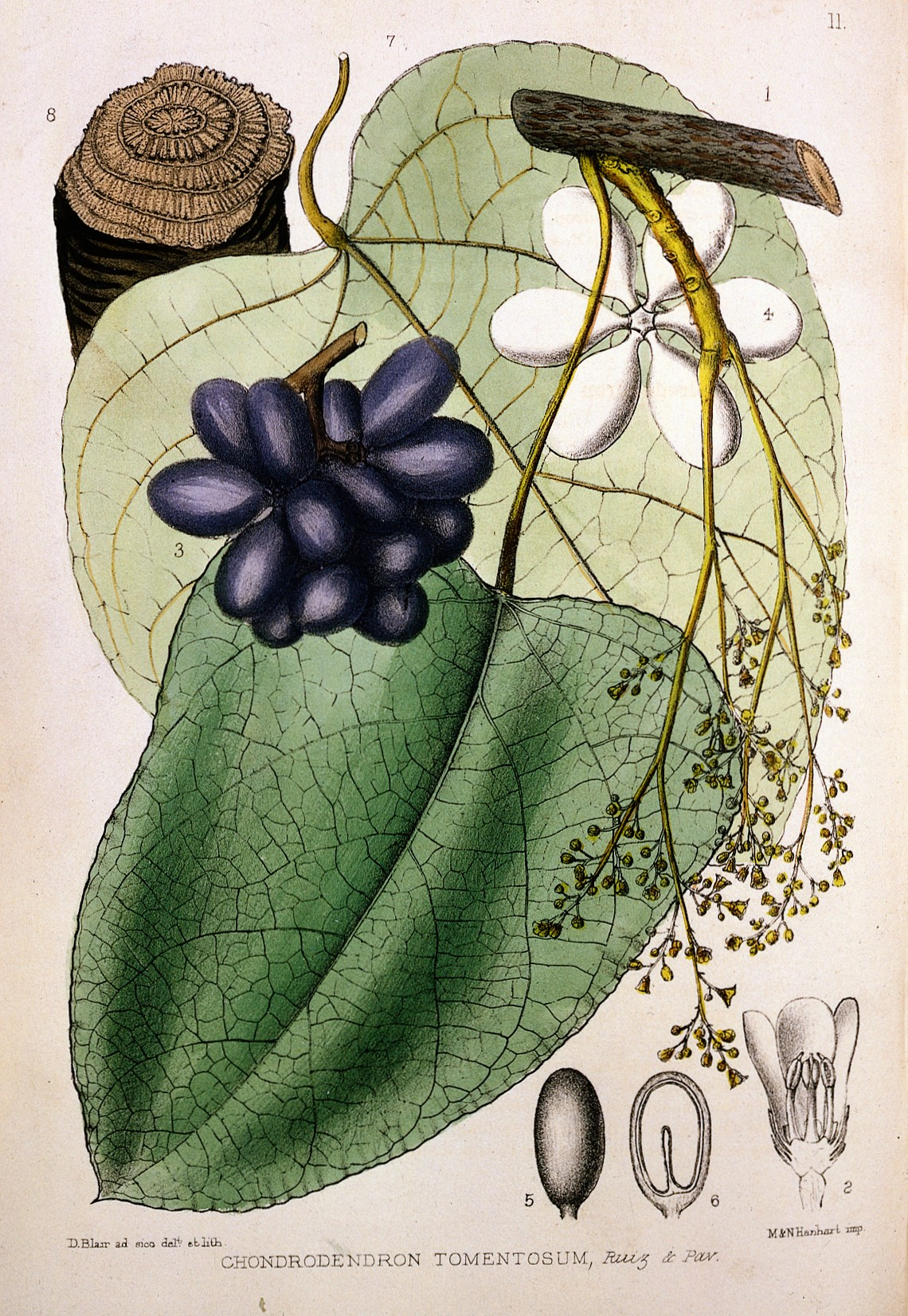

Conservation status
- Least Concern (IUCN 3.1)

Scientific classification
- Kingdom: Plantae
- Clade: Embryophytes
- Clade: Tracheophytes
- Clade: Spermatophytes
- Clade: Angiosperms
- Clade: Eudicots
- Order: Ranunculales
- Family: Menispermaceae
- Genus: Chondrodendron
- Species: C. tomentosum

Binomial name
- Chondrodendron tomentosum Ruiz & Pav.

Synonyms
- Botryopsis spruceana Eichler; Chondrodendron cretosum Miers; Chondrodendron hypoleucum Standl.

= Chondrodendron tomentosum =

Species of flowering plant

Chondrodendron tomentosum is one of six accepted species in the small genus Chondrodendron, belonging to the Moonseed family Menispermaceae. It is a large tropical liana native to Central and South America. It contains highly toxic alkaloids and is one of the sources of the arrow poison curare – specifically 'tube curare', the name of which is derived from the name of the medicinally valuable alkaloid tubocurarine.

== Chemistry and uses ==
Chondrodendron tomentosum is a botanical source of curare alkaloids. In 1943, Oskar Wintersteiner and J. D. Dutcher isolated crystalline d-tubocurarine from curare prepared from material of this plant species. They also isolated and characterized another alkaloid, which they named d-chondocurine.

== Derivation of scientific name ==
The generic name is a compound of Greek χόνδρος ( chondros ) 'cartilage' / 'lump' / 'grain' and δένδρον ( dendron ) 'tree' – hence 'lumpy / gristly tree', while the specific name consists of the Latin adjectival form tomentosum 'covered in matted hairs'. The binomial in its entirety thus conveys the image of a rather large coarse plant.

== Description ==
Chondrodendron tomentosum is a woody climbing plant with stems that can reach 10 cm in thickness at the base and which can climb up to 30 metres into the rainforest canopy. The large, glossy, cordate leaves are densely clothed beneath with a silky white pubescence, from which it gets its common name 'Velvet Leaf'.
