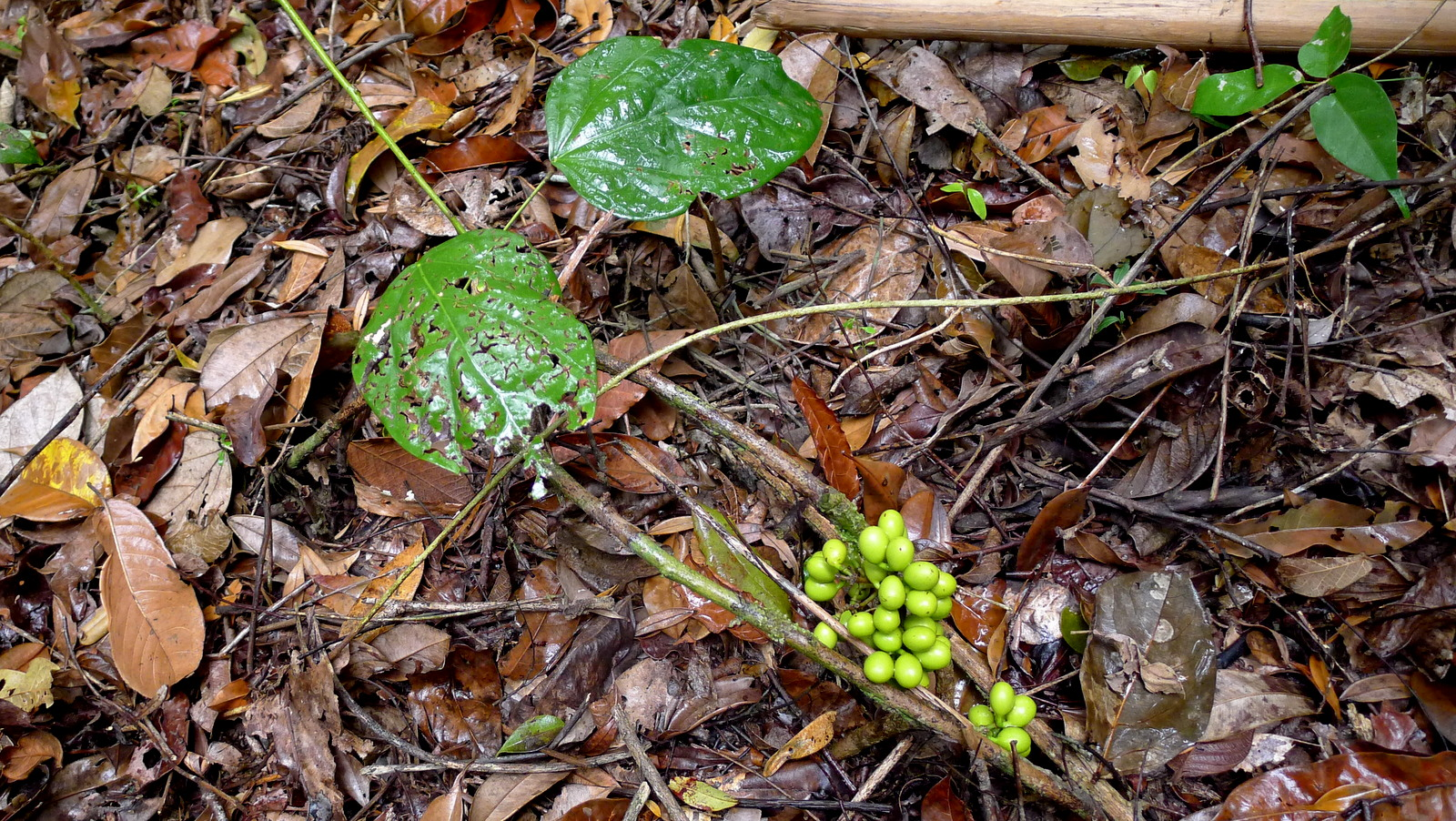
- Chondrodendron platiphyllum

Scientific classification
- Kingdom: Plantae
- Clade: Embryophytes
- Clade: Tracheophytes
- Clade: Spermatophytes
- Clade: Angiosperms
- Clade: Eudicots
- Order: Ranunculales
- Family: Menispermaceae
- Tribe: Tiliacoreae
- Genus: Chondrodendron; Ruiz & Pav. (1794)

Synonyms
- Botryopsis Miers (1851)

= Chondrodendron =

Genus of flowering plants

Chondrodendron is a genus of flowering plants belonging to the family Menispermaceae.

Its native range is tropical Central and South America, from Panama to Bolivia and eastern Brazil.

Species:

- Chondrodendron microphyllum (Eichler) Moldenke
- Chondrodendron platyphyllum (A.St.-Hil.) Miers
- Chondrodendron tomentosum Ruiz & Pav.
