= Decamethonium =

Medication

Clinical data
- ATC code: None

Identifiers
- IUPAC name: Trimethyl-(10-trimethylammoniodecyl)ammonium
- CAS Number: 156-74-1
- PubChem CID: 10921
- DrugBank: DB01245
- ChemSpider: 10459
- UNII: C1CG1S3T2W
- ChEBI: CHEBI:41934
- ChEMBL: ChEMBL1134
- CompTox Dashboard (EPA): DTXSID5048394

Chemical and physical data
- Formula: C_{16}H_{38}N_{2}
- Molar mass: 258.494 g·mol^{−1}
- 3D model (JSmol): Interactive image
- SMILES: [Br-].[Br-].C(CCCC[N+](C)(C)C)CCCCC[N+](C)(C)C
- InChI: InChI=1S/C16H38N2.2BrH/c1-17(2,3)15-13-11-9-7-8-10-12-14-16-18(4,5)6;;/h7-16H2,1-6H3;2*1H/q+2;;/p-2; Key:HLXQFVXURMXRPU-UHFFFAOYSA-L

Decamethonium (Syncurine) is a depolarizing muscle relaxant or neuromuscular blocking agent, and is used in anesthesia to induce paralysis.

== Pharmacology ==
Decamethonium, which has a short action time, is similar to acetylcholine and acts as a partial agonist of the nicotinic acetylcholine receptor. In the motor endplate, it causes depolarization, preventing further effects to the normal release of acetylcholine from the presynaptic terminal, and therefore preventing the neural stimulus from affecting the muscle. In the process of binding, decamethonium activates (depolarizes) the motor endplate - but since the decamethonium itself is not degraded, the membrane remains depolarized and unresponsive to normal acetylcholine release.

== Contraindications/limitations ==
Decamethonium does not produce unconsciousness or anesthesia, and its effects may cause considerable psychological distress while simultaneously making it impossible for a patient to communicate. For these reasons, administration of the drug to a conscious patient is strongly advised against, except in necessary emergency situations.

Decamethonium was used clinically in the UK for many years, but it is now available only for research purposes.

== See also ==
- Suxamethonium
- Hexamethonium
