= Candocuronium iodide =

Chemical compound

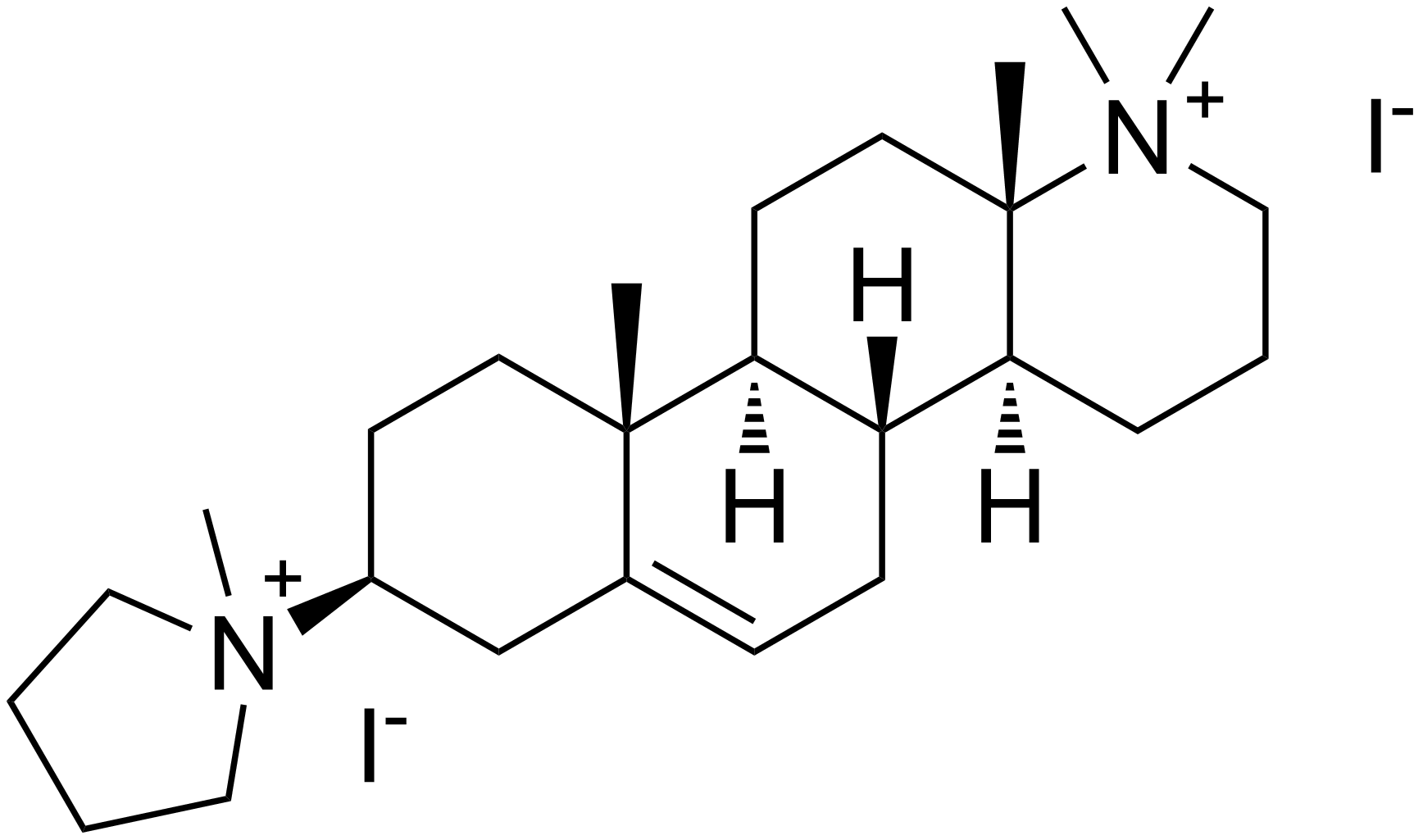

Clinical data
- Other names: Chandonium iodide; HS-310
- Pregnancy category: Not applicable
- Routes of administration: IV
- ATC code: none

Legal status
- Legal status: Discontinued from clinical development

Pharmacokinetic data
- Bioavailability: 100% (IV)

Identifiers
- IUPAC name: (4aS,4bR,8S,10aR,10bS,12aS)-1,1,10a,12a-tetramethyl-8-(1-methylpyrrolidin-1-ium-1-yl)-3,4,4a,4b,5,7,8,9,10,10b,11,12-dodecahydro-2H-naphtho[2,1-f]quinolin-1-ium diiodide
- CAS Number: 54278-85-2
- PubChem CID: 71537
- ChemSpider: 64610
- UNII: SC80GNP08C
- ChEMBL: ChEMBL2106112
- CompTox Dashboard (EPA): DTXSID60969306

Chemical and physical data
- Formula: C_{26}H_{46}I_{2}N_{2}
- Molar mass: 640.477 g·mol^{−1}
- 3D model (JSmol): Interactive image
- SMILES: [I-].[I-].C53=C/C[C@@H]1[C@H](CC[C@]2([C@H]1CCC[N+]2(C)C)C)[C@@]3(C)CC[C@H]([N+]4(C)CCCC4)C/5
- InChI: InChI=1S/C26H46N2.2HI/c1-25-14-12-21(28(5)17-6-7-18-28)19-20(25)10-11-22-23(25)13-15-26(2)24(22)9-8-16-27(26,3)4;;/h10,21-24H,6-9,11-19H2,1-5H3;2*1H/q+2;;/p-2/t21-,22+,23-,24-,25-,26-;;/m0../s1; Key:GGAGIPMNQXAXNH-XDMKMBKMSA-L

Candocuronium iodide (INN; formerly chandonium iodide or HS-310) is an aminosteroid neuromuscular-blocking drug that was investigated as a muscle relaxant for use in anesthesia. It acts by blocking the binding of the nicotinic acetylcholine receptor at the neuromuscular junction. By blocking these receptors, it prevents acetylcholine from triggering muscle contraction, leading to muscle relaxation.

== Medical use and discontinuation ==
Candocuronium was clinically evaluated in India for providing skeletal muscle relaxation during surgery, easing tracheal intubation, and assisting with mechanical ventilation. Clinical studies reported a rapid onset of action with a short duration. Development was discontinued due to cardiovascular side effects, notably tachycardia. Several studies suggested that the severity of these effects were similar to that of the clinically established neuromuscular blocker, pancuronium bromide. Research indicated that candocuronium had minimal ganglion-blocking activity and higher potency than pancuronium.

== History and development ==
=== Rationale and design ===
The drug was developed in the laboratory of Harkishan Singh at Panjab University as part of a research program seeking a non-depolarizing neuromuscular blocker to replace the widely used depolarizing agent suxamethonium (succinylcholine). The design of candocuronium places it in a series of mono- and bis-quaternary azasteroid. The approach adopted in its development used the rigid steroid skeleton as a spacer to hold two quaternary ammonium groups (inspired by the alkaloid malouetine), which incorporate fragments resembling choline or acetylcholine, at a specific distance.

=== Synthesis and early analogs ===
The research program first produced HS-342, a bis-quaternary agent that was reportedly equipotent with tubocurarine and had one-third its duration of action. However, it was deemed unsuitable for further clinical evaluation.

Subsequent chemical modifications of HS-342 led to the synthesis of two related derivatives: HS-310 (later named candocuronium) and HS-347. HS-347, though equipotent with tubocurarine, was precluded from clinical trials because it exhibited considerable ganglion-blocking activity, which would potentially lead to undesirable autonomic side effects.

=== Further modifications and legacy ===
H-310 did not achieve the desired clinical profile, which led to the continued modification of its structure, ultimately resulting in the creation of dihydrochandonium (HS-626). The new variant was an analog, and was reported to be a slightly better neuromuscular blocking profile and had no vagolytic effects. However, this benefit was not considered significant enough to advance the compound to human trials.

The discovery of candocuronium prompted further research into modifications of the androstane nucleus, particularly at the 3- and 16-positions, leading to the development of other agents considered for clinical testing.
