= Selective relaxant binding agents =

Selective relaxant binding agents (SRBAs) are a new class of drugs that selectively encapsulates and binds neuromuscular blocking agents (NMBAs). The first drug introduction of an SRBA is sugammadex. SRBAs exert a chelating action that effectively terminates an NMBA ability to bind to nicotinic receptors.

Examples of SRBAs include:

1. Sugammadex is a modified gamma cyclodextrin that specifically encapsulates and binds the aminosteroid NMBAs: affinity is highest for rocuronium, followed by vecuronium, and relatively low affinity for pancuronium.

2. Adamgammadex is also a modified gamma-cyclodextrin, with acetyl-amino groups replacing the carboxylic acid groups of sugammadex. Early research suggests it may have a lower incidence of adverse reactions than sugammadex

3. Calabadion 1 and calabadion 2 are cucurbituril molecules with high binding affinity for both aminosteroid and benzylisoquinoline muscle relaxants. Calabadion 2 has 89 times the affinity for rocuronium than does sugammadex.

== Discovery of SRBAs ==
The discovery of SRBA as a new class of drug is the result of work done by Organon laboratories at the Newhouse research site in Scotland. Cyclodextrins were explored as a means to solubilize rocuronium bromide (a steroidal NMBA) in a neutral aqueous solution. Upon creating numerous modified cyclodextrins, one particular molecule was found to possess extremely high affinity for the rocuronium molecule. Originally known as Org25969, it is now generically named sugammadex sodium.
