= Vecuronium bromide =

Muscle relaxant

Clinical data
- Trade names: Norcuron, others
- AHFS/Drugs.com: Monograph
- License data: US DailyMed: Vecuronium bromide
- Routes of administration: Intravenous
- ATC code: M03AC03 (WHO)

Legal status
- Legal status: US: ℞-only

Pharmacokinetic data
- Bioavailability: 100% (IV)
- Metabolism: liver 30%
- Onset of action: < 1 min
- Elimination half-life: 51–80 minutes (longer with kidney failure)
- Duration of action: 15–30 min
- Excretion: Fecal (40–75%) and kidney (30% as unchanged drug and metabolites)

Identifiers
- IUPAC name: [(2S,3S,5S,8R,9S,10S,13S,14S,16S,17S)-17-Acetyloxy-10,13-dimethyl-16-(1-methyl-3,4,5,6-tetrahydro-2H-pyridin-1-yl)-2-(1-piperidyl)-2,3,4,5,6,7,8,9,11,12,14,15,16,17-tetradecahydro-1H-cyclopenta[a]phenanthren-3-yl] acetate bromide
- CAS Number: 50700-72-6
- PubChem CID: 39764
- DrugBank: DB01339
- ChemSpider: 36357
- UNII: 7E4PHP5N1D
- KEGG: D00767
- ChEMBL: ChEMBL1201219
- CompTox Dashboard (EPA): DTXSID1023736
- ECHA InfoCard: 100.051.549

Chemical and physical data
- Formula: C_{34}H_{57}BrN_{2}O_{4}
- Molar mass: 637.744 g·mol^{−1}
- 3D model (JSmol): Interactive image
- SMILES: CC(=O)O[C@H]1C[C@@H]2CC[C@@H]3[C@@H]([C@]2(C[C@@H]1N4CCCCC4)C)CC[C@]5([C@H]3C[C@@H]([C@@H]5OC(=O)C)[N+]6(CCCCC6)C)C.[Br-]
- InChI: InChI=1S/C34H57N2O4.BrH/c1-23(37)39-31-20-25-12-13-26-27(34(25,4)22-29(31)35-16-8-6-9-17-35)14-15-33(3)28(26)21-30(32(33)40-24(2)38)36(5)18-10-7-11-19-36;/h25-32H,6-22H2,1-5H3;1H/q+1;/p-1/t25-,26+,27-,28-,29-,30-,31-,32-,33-,34-;/m0./s1; Key:VEPSYABRBFXYIB-PWXDFCLTSA-M

Vecuronium bromide, sold under the brand name Norcuron among others, is a medication used as part of general anesthesia to provide skeletal muscle relaxation during surgery or mechanical ventilation. It is also used to help with endotracheal intubation; however, agents such as suxamethonium (succinylcholine) or rocuronium are generally preferred if this needs to be done quickly. It is given by injection into a vein. Effects are greatest at about 4 minutes and last for up to an hour.

Side effects may include low blood pressure and prolonged paralysis. Allergic reactions are rare. It is unclear if use in pregnancy is safe for the fetus.

Vecuronium is in the aminosteroid neuromuscular-blocker family of medications and is of the non-depolarizing type. It works by competitively blocking the action of acetylcholine on skeletal muscles. The effects may be reversed with sugammadex or a combination of neostigmine and glycopyrrolate. To minimize residual blockade, reversal should only be attempted if some degree of spontaneous recovery has been achieved.

Vecuronium was approved for medical use in the United States in 1984 and is available as a generic medication. It is on the World Health Organization's List of Essential Medicines.

== Mechanism of action ==
Vecuronium operates by competing for the cholinoceptors at the motor end plate, thereby exerting its muscle-relaxing properties, which are used adjunctively to general anesthesia. Under balanced anesthesia, the time to recovery to 25% of control (clinical duration) is approximately 25 to 40 minutes after injection and recovery is usually 95% complete approximately 45 to 65 minutes after injection of an intubating dose. The neuromuscular blocking action of vecuronium is slightly enhanced in the presence of potent inhalation anesthetics. If vecuronium is first administered more than 5 minutes after the start of the inhalation of enflurane, isoflurane, or halothane, or when a steady state has been achieved, the intubating dose of vecuronium may be decreased by approximately 15%.

Vecuronium has an active metabolite, 3-desacetyl-vecuronium, that has 80% of the effect of vecuronium. Accumulation of this metabolite, which is cleared by the kidneys, can prolong the duration of action of the drug, particularly when an infusion is used in a person with kidney failure.

Reversal of vecuronium can be accomplished by administration of sugammadex which is a γ-cyclodextrin which encapsulates vecuronium preventing it from binding to receptors. Reversal can also be accomplished with neostigmine or other cholinesterase inhibitors, but their efficacy is lower than that of sugammadex.

== History ==
As long ago as 1862, adventurer Don Ramon Paez described a Venezuelan poison, guachamaca, which the indigenous peoples used to lace sardines as bait for herons and cranes. If the head and neck of a bird so killed was cut off, the remainder of the flesh could be eaten safely. Paez also described the attempt of a Llanero woman to murder a rival to her lover's affections with guachamaca and unintentionally killed 10 other people when her husband shared his food with their guests. It is probable that the plant was Malouetia nitida or Malouetia schomburgki.

The genus Malouetia (family Apocynaceae) is found in both South America and Africa. The botanist Robert E. Woodson Jr comprehensively classified the American species of Malouetia in 1935. At that time, only one African species of Malouetia was recognized, but the following year Woodson described a second: Malouetia bequaertiana, from the Belgian Congo.

In 1960, scientists reported the isolation of malouetine from the roots and bark of Malouetia bequaertiana Woodson by means of an ion exchange technique. Optimization of the aminosteroid nucleus led to a sequence of synthesized derivatives, ultimately leading to pancuronium bromide in 1964. The name was derived from p(iperidino)an(drostane)cur(arising)-onium.

A paper published in 1973 discussed the structure-activity relationships of a series of aminosteroid muscle relaxants, including the mono-quaternary analogue of pancuronium, later called vecuronium.

== Society and culture ==
Vecuronium bromide has been used as part of a drug cocktail that prisons in the United States use for execution by lethal injection. Vecuronium is used to paralyze the prisoner and stop his or her breathing, in conjunction with a sedative and potassium chloride to stop the prisoner's heart. Injections of vecuronium bromide without proper sedation allow the person to be fully awake but unable to move in response to pain.

In 2001, Japanese nurse Daisuke Mori was reported to have murdered 10 patients using vecuronium bromide. He was convicted of murder and was sentenced to life imprisonment.

In 2022, Vanderbilt University Medical Center nurse RaDonda Vaught was convicted of two felony charges in the death of a patient who was mistakenly administered vecuronium bromide, rather than the sedative midazolam, also known as Versed.
