= Newhouse Research Site =

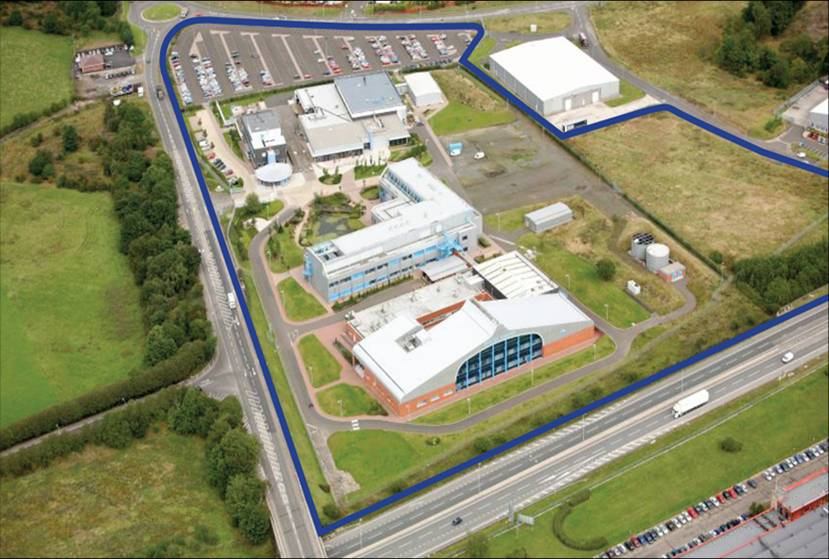
- Location: Newhouse, North Lanarkshire, Scotland; 55°50′07″N 3°57′22″W
- Operating agency: Organon

The Newhouse Research Site is a drug research facility situated 15 miles (24 km) east of Glasgow in central Scotland. It is located beside the M8 motorway in Newhouse, North Lanarkshire. The site is an early drug discovery research centre with a track record of generating a succession of products in the areas of anaesthesia and psychiatry. In 2007, the Royal Society of Chemistry Malcolm Campbell Memorial Prize was awarded to researchers for its work on a new anaesthesia drug, sugammadex. It currently employs 250 scientists across a range of disciplines including medicinal chemistry, molecular biology and drug metabolism. The site is currently the largest private drug discovery centre in Scotland, and one of the biggest in the UK.

== History ==
The 20-acre (8.1 ha) campus was acquired by Organon in 1948 and has continued to grow throughout the years. Scientists at the site are responsible for the invention of a succession of successful products, two of which have recently received approval. Organon was acquired by Schering-Plough in 2007, and the site was further expanded with the addition of one of the largest compound management facilities in the industry. Schering-Plough merged with Merck (known as MSD outside of North America) at the end of 2009.

== Products ==
The site has a long history of research in the area of neuromuscular blockers, which are commonly used during surgery, and was responsible for the identification of rocuronium as well as a number of other drugs. In another major advance the reversal agent sugammadex was the first selective relaxant binding agent (SRBA) for Neuromuscular Block Reversal to be identified, and has recently entered the market in Europe. On the psychiatric front researchers at Newhouse supported the development of mirtazepine, a novel tetracyclic anti-depressant which has become widely prescribed throughout the world. More recently the site was closely involved in supporting the introduction of the anti-psychotic asenapine which has just been launched for the treatment of schizophrenia and bipolar disorder.

== Gallery ==
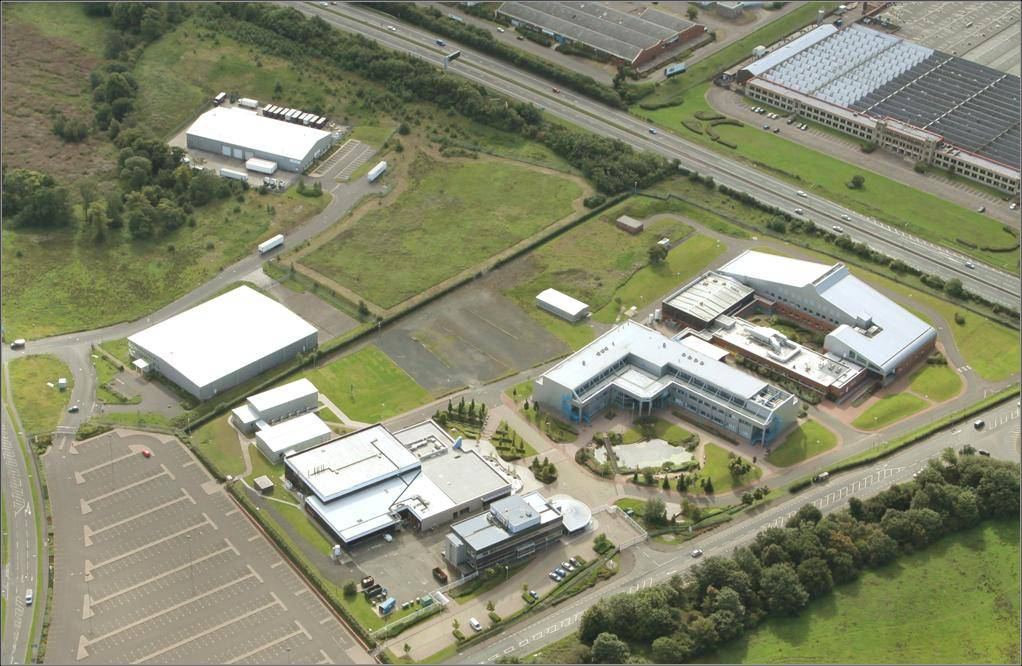
Aerial view from the north

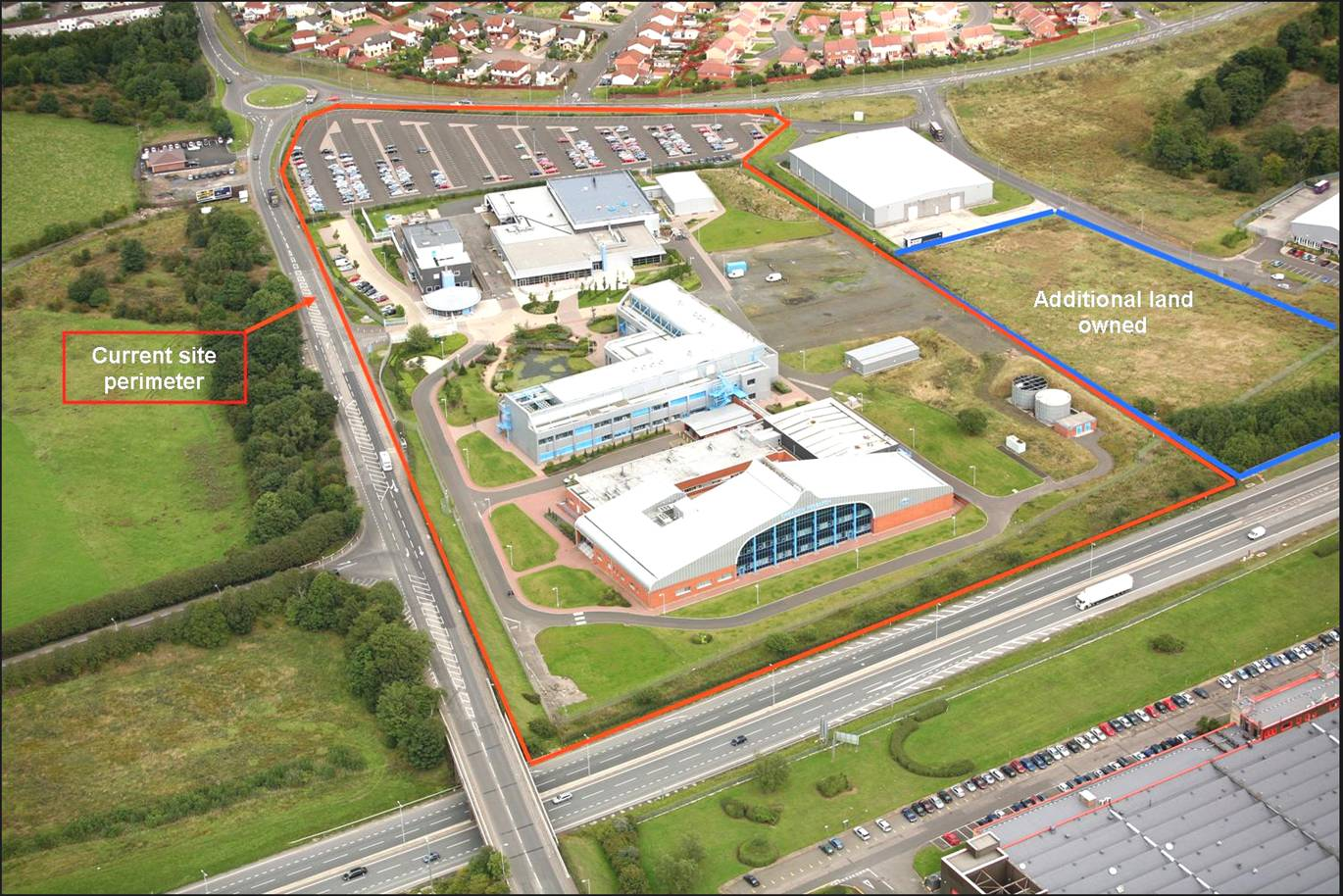
Site boundary

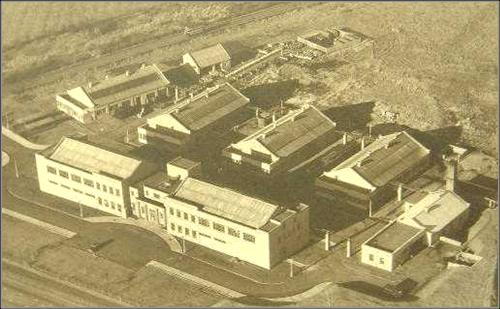
Site in 1949

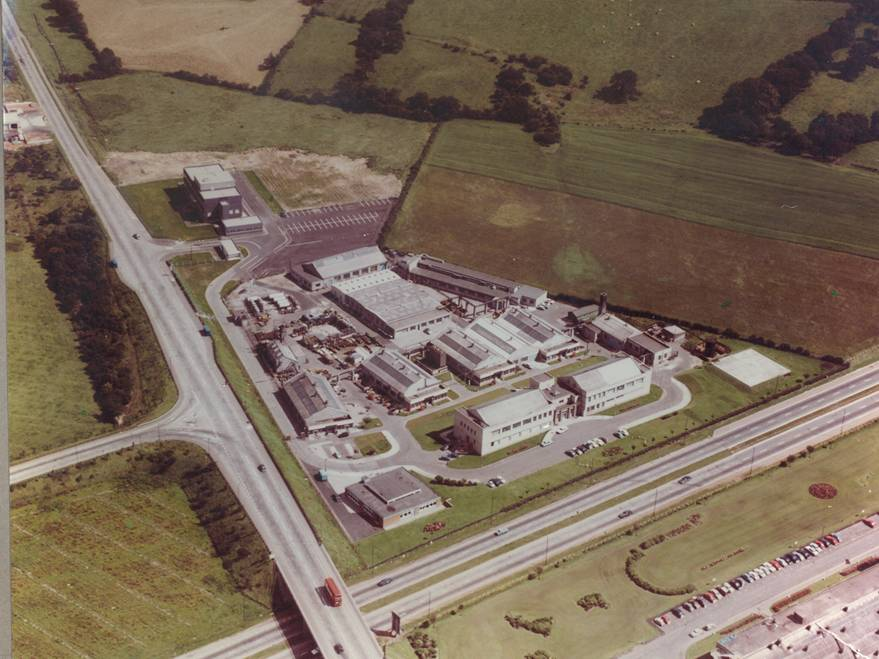
Site in the 1960s

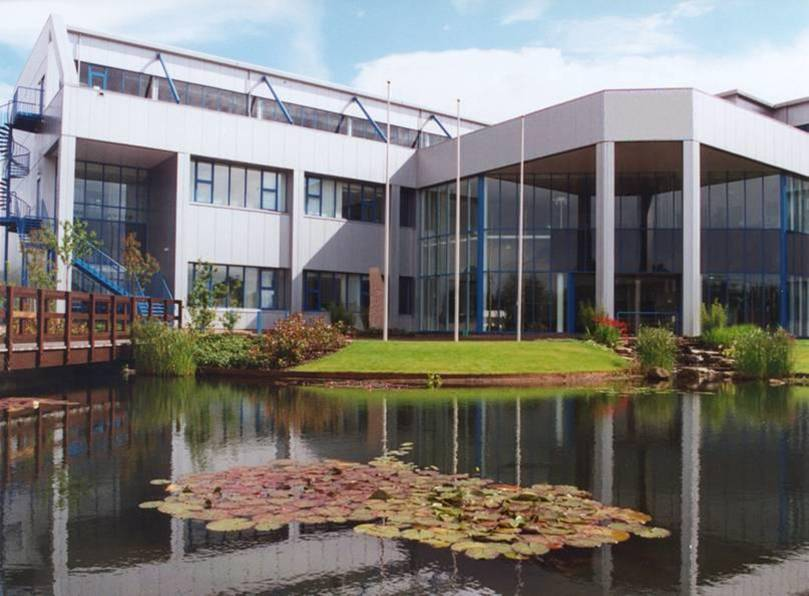
View from across the pond

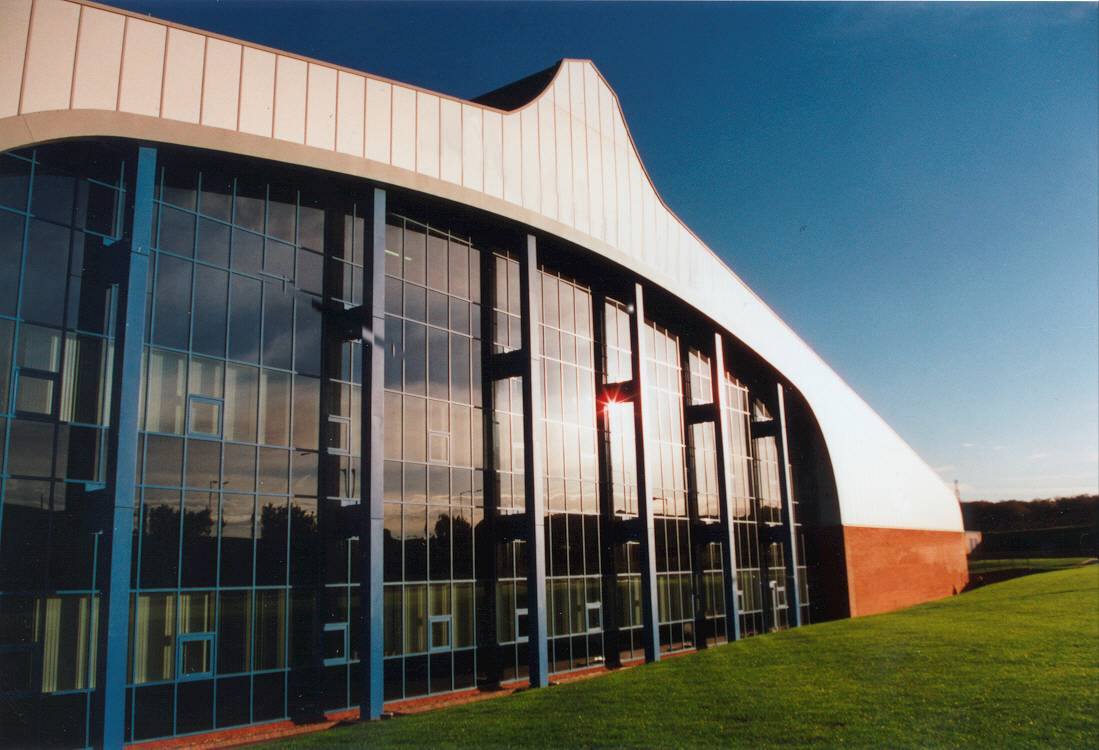
South facing building in the Sun

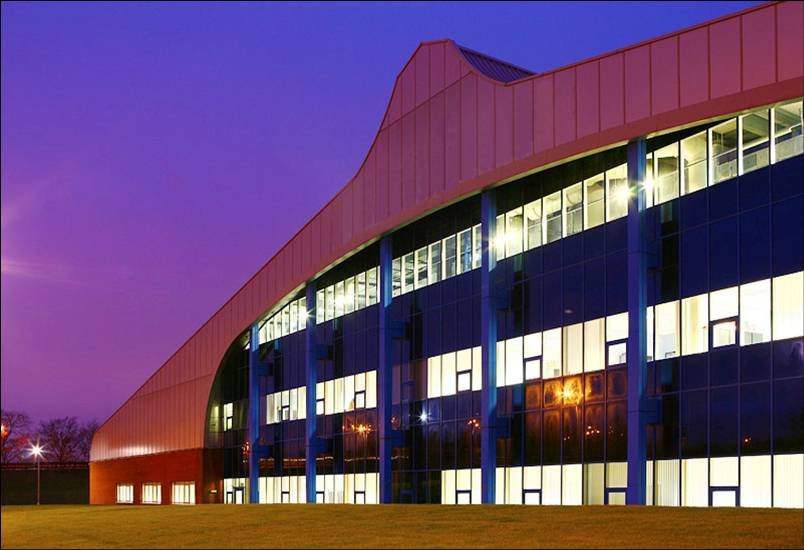
South facing building in the evening

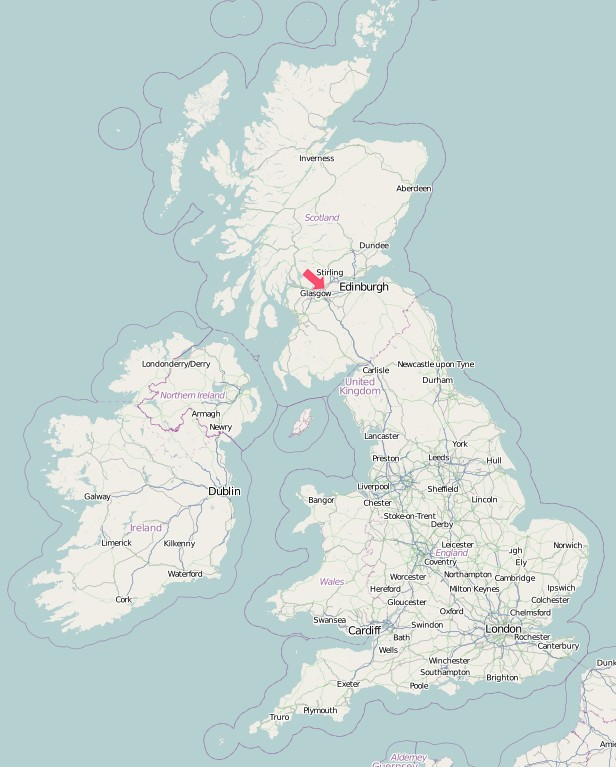
Location of the Newhouse research site, within the United Kingdom
