= Sugammadex =

Selective relaxant binding agent

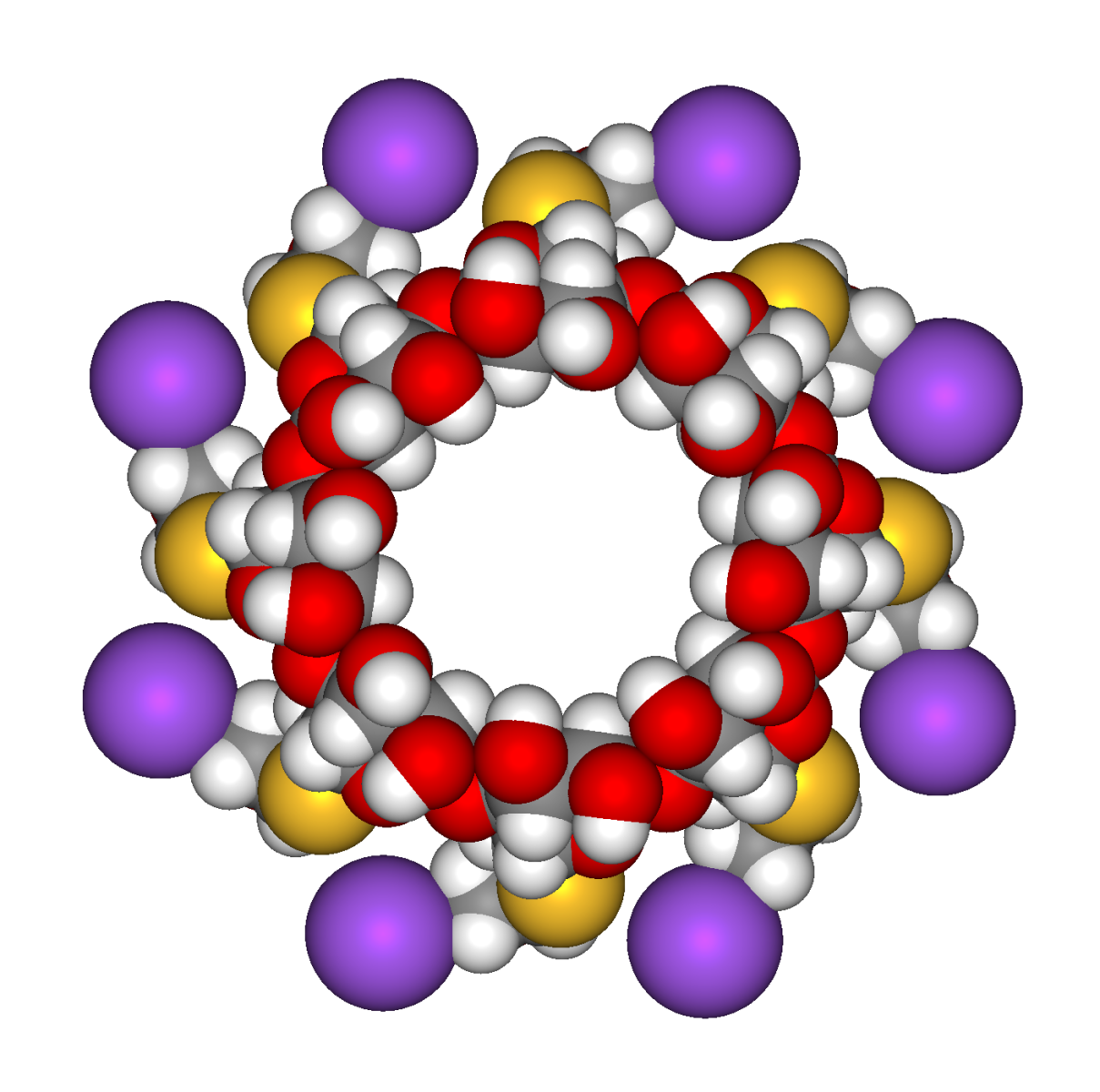

Clinical data
- Pronunciation: soo GAM ma dex
- Trade names: Bridion
- Other names: ORG-25969
- AHFS/Drugs.com: Monograph
- License data: US DailyMed: Sugammadex
- Pregnancy category: AU: B2
- Routes of administration: Intravenous
- ATC code: V03AB35 (WHO)

Legal status
- Legal status: AU: S4 (Prescription only); CA: ℞-only; UK: POM (Prescription only); US: ℞-only; EU: Rx-only; In general: ℞ (Prescription only)

Identifiers
- CAS Number: 343306-71-8
- PubChem CID: 6918585; as salt: 6918584
- DrugBank: DB06206
- ChemSpider: 32689915
- UNII: 361LPM2T56; as salt: ERJ6X2MXV7
- KEGG: as salt: D05940
- ChEBI: CHEBI:90953; as salt: CHEBI:90952
- ChEMBL: ChEMBL2111107; as salt: ChEMBL2107374
- ECHA InfoCard: 100.121.931

Chemical and physical data
- Formula: C_{72}H_{112}O_{48}S_{8}
- Molar mass: 2002.12 g·mol^{−1}
- 3D model (JSmol): Interactive image
- SMILES: O=C(O)CCSC[C@H]1O[C@@H]2O[C@@H]3[C@@H](CSCCC(=O)O)O[C@H](O[C@@H]4[C@@H](CSCCC(=O)O)O[C@H](O[C@@H]5[C@@H](CSCCC(=O)O)O[C@H](O[C@@H]6[C@@H](CSCCC(=O)O)O[C@H](O[C@@H]7[C@@H](CSCCC(=O)O)O[C@H](O[C@@H]8[C@@H](CSCCC(=O)O)O[C@H](O[C@@H]9[C@@H](CSCCC(=O)O)O[C@H](O[C@H]1[C@H](O)[C@H]2O)[C@H](O)[C@H]9O)[C@H](O)[C@H]8O)[C@H](O)[C@H]7O)[C@H](O)[C@H]6O)[C@H](O)[C@H]5O)[C@H](O)[C@H]4O)[C@H](O)[C@H]3O
- InChI: InChI=1S/C72H112O48S8/c73-33(74)1-9-121-17-25-57-41(89)49(97)65(105-25)114-58-26(18-122-10-2-34(75)76)107-67(51(99)43(58)91)116-60-28(20-124-12-4-36(79)80)109-69(53(101)45(60)93)118-62-30(22-126-14-6-38(83)84)111-71(55(103)47(62)95)120-64-32(24-128-16-8-40(87)88)112-72(56(104)48(64)96)119-63-31(23-127-15-7-39(85)86)110-70(54(102)46(63)94)117-61-29(21-125-13-5-37(81)82)108-68(52(100)44(61)92)115-59-27(19-123-11-3-35(77)78)106-66(113-57)50(98)42(59)90/h25-32,41-72,89-104H,1-24H2,(H,73,74)(H,75,76)(H,77,78)(H,79,80)(H,81,82)(H,83,84)(H,85,86)(H,87,88)/t25-,26-,27-,28-,29-,30-,31-,32-,41-,42-,43-,44-,45-,46-,47-,48-,49-,50-,51-,52-,53-,54-,55-,56-,57-,58-,59-,60-,61-,62-,63-,64-,65-,66-,67-,68-,69-,70-,71-,72-/m1/s1; Key:WHRODDIHRRDWEW-VTHZAVIASA-N

Sugammadex, sold under the brand name Bridion, is a medication for the reversal of neuromuscular blockade induced by rocuronium and vecuronium in general anaesthesia. It is the first selective relaxant binding agent (SRBA). It is marketed by Merck.

The most common side effects include cough, airway problems due to the anaesthesia wearing off, reduced blood pressure and other complications such as changes in heart rate.

Sugammadex is available as a generic medication.

== Medical uses ==
Sugammadex is indicated for the reversal of neuromuscular blockade induced by rocuronium or vecuronium.

== Pharmacology ==
=== Pharmacodynamics ===
Sugammadex is a modified γ-cyclodextrin, with a lipophilic core and a hydrophilic periphery. This gamma cyclodextrin has been modified from its natural state by placing eight carboxyl thio ether groups at the sixth carbon positions. These extensions extend the cavity size allowing greater encapsulation of the rocuronium molecule. These negatively charged extensions electrostatically bind to the quaternary nitrogen of the target as well as contribute to the aqueous nature of the cyclodextrin. Sugammadex's binding encapsulation of rocuronium is one of the strongest among cyclodextrins and their guest molecules. The rocuronium molecule (a modified steroid) bound within sugammadex's lipophilic core, is rendered unavailable to bind to the acetylcholine receptor at the neuromuscular junction.

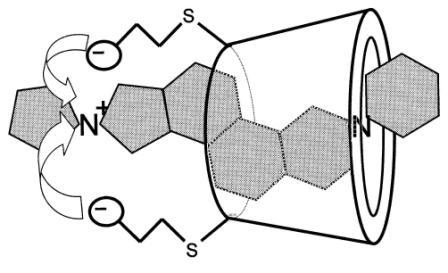

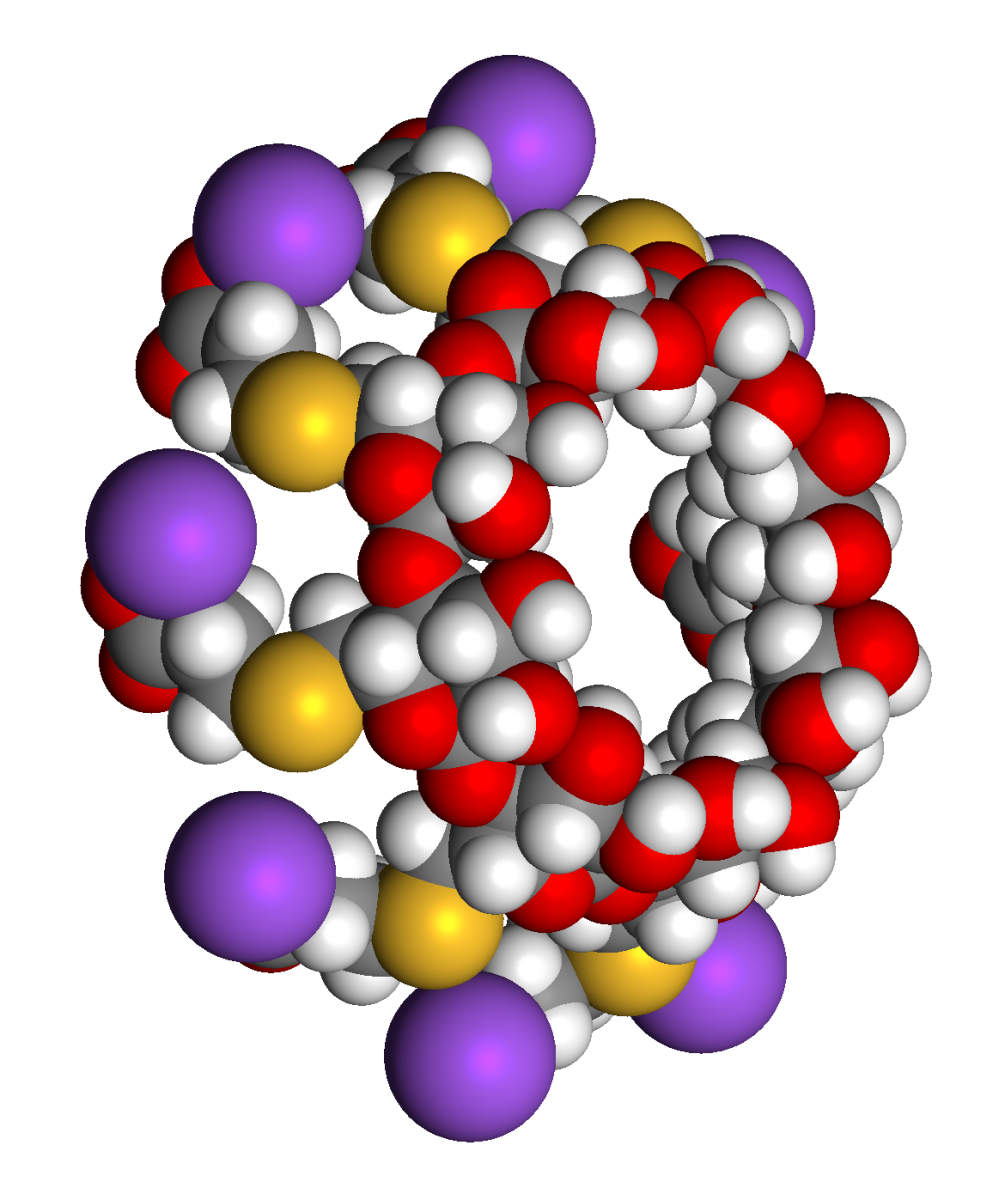

Left: Schematic of a sugammadex molecule encapsulating a rocuronium molecule.
Right: Space-filling model of a sugammadex sodium molecule in the same orientation.

Sugammadex, unlike neostigmine, does not inhibit acetylcholinesterase so cholinergic effects are not produced and co-administration of an antimuscarinic agent (glycopyrronium bromide or atropine) is not needed. Sugammadex might therefore be expected to have fewer adverse effects than the traditional reversal agents.

When muscle relaxant with rapid onset and short duration of action is required, there has been little choice apart from succinylcholine but this drug has important contraindications; for example, it can trigger malignant hyperthermia in susceptible individuals, it has a prolonged duration of action in patients with pseudocholinesterase deficiency and it causes an increase in plasma potassium concentration which is dangerous in some circumstances. Rocuronium has a comparably quick onset in high dose (0.6 mg kg^{−1} to 1 mg kg^{−1}) and can be rapidly reversed with sugammadex (16 mg kg^{−1}), so this drug combination offers an alternative to suxamethonium.

'Recurarisation', a phenomenon of recurrence of neuromuscular block, may occur where the reversal agents wear off before a neuromuscular blocking drug is completely cleared. This is very unusual with all but the longest acting neuromuscular blocking drugs (such as gallamine, pancuronium or tubocurarine). It has been demonstrated to occur only rarely with sugammadex, and only when insufficient doses were administered. The underlying mechanism is thought to be related to redistribution of relaxant after reversal. It may occur for a limited range of sugammadex doses which are sufficient for complex formation with relaxant in the central compartment, but insufficient for additional relaxant returning to central from peripheral compartments.

Sugammadex has been shown to have affinity for two other aminosteroid neuromuscular blocking agents, vecuronium and pancuronium. Although sugammadex has a lower affinity for vecuronium than for rocuronium, reversal of vecuronium is still effective because fewer vecuronium molecules are present in vivo for equivalent blockade: vecuronium is approximately seven times more potent than rocuronium. Sugammadex encapsulates with a 1:1 ratio and therefore will adequately reverse vecuronium as there are fewer molecules to bind compared to rocuronium. Shallow pancuronium blockade has been successfully reversed by sugammadex in phase III clinical trials.

== Efficacy ==
A study was carried out in Europe looking at its suitability in rapid sequence induction. It found that sugammadex provides a rapid and dose-dependent reversal of neuromuscular blockade induced by high-dose rocuronium.

A Cochrane review on sugammadex concluded that "sugammadex was shown to be more effective than placebo (no medication) or neostigmine in reversing muscle relaxation caused by neuromuscular blockade during surgery and is relatively safe. Serious complications occurred in less than 1% of the patients who received sugammadex. The results of this review article (especially the safety results) need to be confirmed by future trials on larger patient populations". The 2017 Cochrane review concluded that sugammadex has a better safety profile than neostigmine with 40% fewer adverse events. Specifically the risks of postoperative residual paralysis, bradycardia, nausea and vomiting are reduced if sugammadex is used as a reversal agent. The British Journal of Anaesthesia published an article in 2015 in which the incidence of residual neuromuscular blockade could be reduced to zero if sugammadex is used as the reversal agent and the correct dosage is selected with the use of neuromuscular monitoring. Also when the reversal times of each agent were compared "Data indicate that sugammadex was 10.22 minutes (6.6 times) faster than neostigmine (1.96 vs 12.87 minutes) in reversing moderate induced paralysis. Sugammadex was 45.78 minutes (16.8 times) faster than neostigmine (2.9 vs 48.8 minutes) in reversing deep induced paralysis." The time saved by rapid reversal and the reduction of postoperative residual paralysis may reduce the overall hospital costs and provide significant improvements in patient safety.

== Tolerability ==
Sugammadex was generally well tolerated in clinical trials in surgical patients or healthy volunteers. In pooled analyses, the tolerability profile of sugammadex was generally similar to that of placebo or neostigmine plus glycopyrrolate. Sugammadex may theoretically interfere with hormonal contraceptives due to evidence from in vitro binding studies which showed it may bind to progestogen.

== History ==
Sugammadex was discovered by the pharmaceutical company Organon at the Newhouse Research Site in Scotland. Organon was acquired by Schering-Plough in 2007; Schering-Plough merged with Merck in 2009. Sugammadex is now owned and sold by Merck.

The US Food and Drug Administration (FDA) initially rejected Schering-Plough's New Drug Application for sugammadex in 2008, but finally approved the medication for use in the United States in December 2015. Sugammadex was approved for use in the European Union in July 2008.
