= Duador =

Duador may refer to:

- A brand name pharmaceutical drug containing albendazole
- A synonym for the muscle relaxant dihydrochandonium
