= Aminosteroid =

Class of chemical compounds

Pancuronium, the first aminosteroid neuromuscular blocking agent to be introduced.

Aminosteroids are a group of steroids with a similar structure based on an amino-substituted steroid nucleus. They are neuromuscular blocking agents, acting as competitive antagonists of the nicotinic acetylcholine receptor (nAChR), and block the signaling of acetylcholine in the nervous system. These drugs include candocuronium iodide (chandonium iodide), dacuronium bromide, dihydrochandonium, dipyrandium, malouetine, pancuronium bromide, pipecuronium bromide, rapacuronium bromide, rocuronium bromide, stercuronium iodide, and vecuronium bromide.

== See also ==
- Benzylisoquinolines, such as atracurium and tubocurarine, the other major group of neuromuscular blocking agents
