= Curarea candicans =

Scientific classification
- Kingdom: Plantae
- Clade: Tracheophytes
- Clade: Angiosperms
- Clade: Eudicots
- Order: Ranunculales
- Family: Menispermaceae
- Genus: Curarea
- Species: C. candicans

Binomial name
- Curarea candicans (Rich. ex DC.) Barneby & Krukoff

Synonyms
- Abuta candicans Rich. ex DC.; Chondrodendron candicans (Rich. ex DC.) Sandwith; Sciadotenia candicans (Rich. ex DC.) Diels in H.G.A.Engler (ed.); Abuta limaciifolia Diels in H.G.A.Engler (ed.); Abuta pullei Diels; Chondrodendron limaciifolium (Diels) Moldenke; Cocculus dichrous Mart.; Sciadotenia leucophylla Miers

Species of flowering plant

Curarea candicans is a species of flowering plant in the family Menispermaceae.
