= Richard Gill (plant collector) =

Richard C. Gill (c.1901-1958) was best known for an expedition to describe the preparation of curare, and bring back samples, in the 1930s. He also published a book describing his expedition.

He had studied medicine, but became a rubber salesman. Unemployment in the 1920s led him to move to the Ecuadorian Andes, where he developed an interest in ethnobotany. This interest was enhanced when he developed multiple sclerosis. Given his experiences in Ecuador, he set up an expedition to obtain and describe the preparation of curare.

Walking with a stick, Gill re-entered the Ecuadorian jungle in 1938. With him were his wife, 75 porters, 36 mules, 12 canoes and quantities of equipment and goods to trade. They headed east, deep into the Amazon basin. At times, they had to blindfold the mules to get them across swaying suspension bridges. At others, they braved white-water rapids. Eventually the expedition set up a base camp close to a village. Because Gill was known and trusted, the people agreed to prepare curare for him in exchange for cloth, knives and other goods. Gill noted which plants were gathered for the curare mixture and took samples of each, along with scores of others that he thought might have medical uses

— Kemp, 2018

The botanical specimens were sent to the New York Botanical Garden while the twenty-five pounds of crude curare were offered to Squibb for analysis.
