= Malouetine =

Names
- IUPAC name [(3S,5S,8R,9S,10S,13S,14S)-10,13-Dimethyl-17-[(1S)-1-(trimethylazaniumyl)ethyl]-2,3,4,5,6,7,8,9,11,12,14,15,16,17-tetradecahydro-1H-cyclopenta[a]phenanthren-3-yl]-trimethylazanium diiodide

Identifiers
CAS Number	10308-44-8
3D model (JSmol)	Interactive image
ChemSpider	166177198
PubChem CID	166177198
UNII	6BQ2F53TRG
- InChI: InChI=1S/C27H52N2.2HI/c1-19(28(4,5)6)23-12-13-24-22-11-10-20-18-21(29(7,8)9)14-16-26(20,2)25(22)15-17-27(23,24)3;;/h19-25H,10-18H2,1-9H3;2*1H/q+2;;/p-2/t19-,20-,21-,22-,23+,24-,25-,26-,27+;;/m0../s1 Key: ZKPCQHGEQUQGJK-DMZQXVSVSA-L
- SMILES: C[C@@H]([C@H]1CC[C@@H]2[C@@]1(CC[C@H]3[C@H]2CC[C@@H]4[C@@]3(CC[C@@H](C4)[N+](C)(C)C)C)C)[N+](C)(C)C.[I-].[I-]

Properties
Chemical formula	C_{27}H_{52}I_{2}N_{2}
Molar mass	658.536 g·mol^{−1}
- Except where otherwise noted, data are given for materials in their standard state (at 25 °C [77 °F], 100 kPa). Infobox references

Malouetine is an aminosteroid neuromuscular blocking agent and antinicotinic alkaloid isolated from Malouetia spp.

The structure of malouetine inspired the development of modern aminosteroid muscle relaxants such as pancuronium bromide and vecuronium bromide by workers at Organon.
