= Malouetia quadricasarum =

Conservation status
- Vulnerable (IUCN 2.3)

Scientific classification
- Kingdom: Plantae
- Clade: Tracheophytes
- Clade: Angiosperms
- Clade: Eudicots
- Clade: Asterids
- Order: Gentianales
- Family: Apocynaceae
- Genus: Malouetia
- Species: M. quadricasarum

Binomial name
- Malouetia quadricasarum Woodson

Synonyms
- Malouetia isthmica Markgr.

Species of plant

Malouetia quadricasarum, synonym Malouetia isthmica, is a species of plant in the family Apocynaceae. It is native to Panama, Colombia and Peru. Under the synonym M. isthmica, it was assessed as "vulnerable" in the 1998 IUCN Red List. It is threatened by habitat loss.
