= Dacuronium bromide =

Chemical compound

Clinical data
- Other names: NB-68; 17β-Hydroxypancuronium bromide; 3α-(Acetyloxy)-17β-hydroxy-2β,16β-bis(1-methylpiperidinium-1-yl)-5α-androstane dibromide; 2β,16β-Dipiperidino-5α-androstane-3α,17β-diol 3α-acetate dimethobromide

Identifiers
- IUPAC name: [(2S,3S,5S,8R,9S,10S,13S,14S,16S,17R)-17-Hydroxy-10,13-dimethyl-2,16-bis(1-methylpiperidin-1-ium-1-yl)-2,3,4,5,6,7,8,9,11,12,14,15,16,17-tetradecahydro-1H-cyclopenta[a]phenanthren-3-yl] acetate;dibromide
- CAS Number: 27115-86-2
- PubChem CID: 14029396
- ChemSpider: 16736917
- UNII: 33482245B6
- ChEMBL: ChEMBL3138544
- CompTox Dashboard (EPA): DTXSID60949880
- ECHA InfoCard: 100.043.834

Chemical and physical data
- Formula: C_{33}H_{58}Br_{2}N_{2}O_{3}
- Molar mass: 690.646 g·mol^{−1}
- 3D model (JSmol): Interactive image
- SMILES: CC(=O)O[C@H]1C[C@@H]2CC[C@@H]3[C@@H]([C@]2(C[C@@H]1[N+]4(CCCCC4)C)C)CC[C@]5([C@H]3C[C@@H]([C@@H]5O)[N+]6(CCCCC6)C)C.[Br-].[Br-]
- InChI: InChI=1S/C33H58N2O3.2BrH/c1-23(36)38-30-20-24-12-13-25-26(33(24,3)22-29(30)35(5)18-10-7-11-19-35)14-15-32(2)27(25)21-28(31(32)37)34(4)16-8-6-9-17-34;;/h24-31,37H,6-22H2,1-5H3;2*1H/q+2;;/p-2/t24-,25+,26-,27-,28-,29-,30-,31-,32-,33-;;/m0../s1; Key:SUKULMJPMHYWKC-GMMLHHOXSA-L

Dacuronium bromide (INN, BAN) (developmental code name NB-68) is an aminosteroid neuromuscular blocking agent which was never marketed. It acts as a competitive antagonist of the nicotinic acetylcholine receptor (nAChR).
