= Stercuronium iodide =

Chemical compound

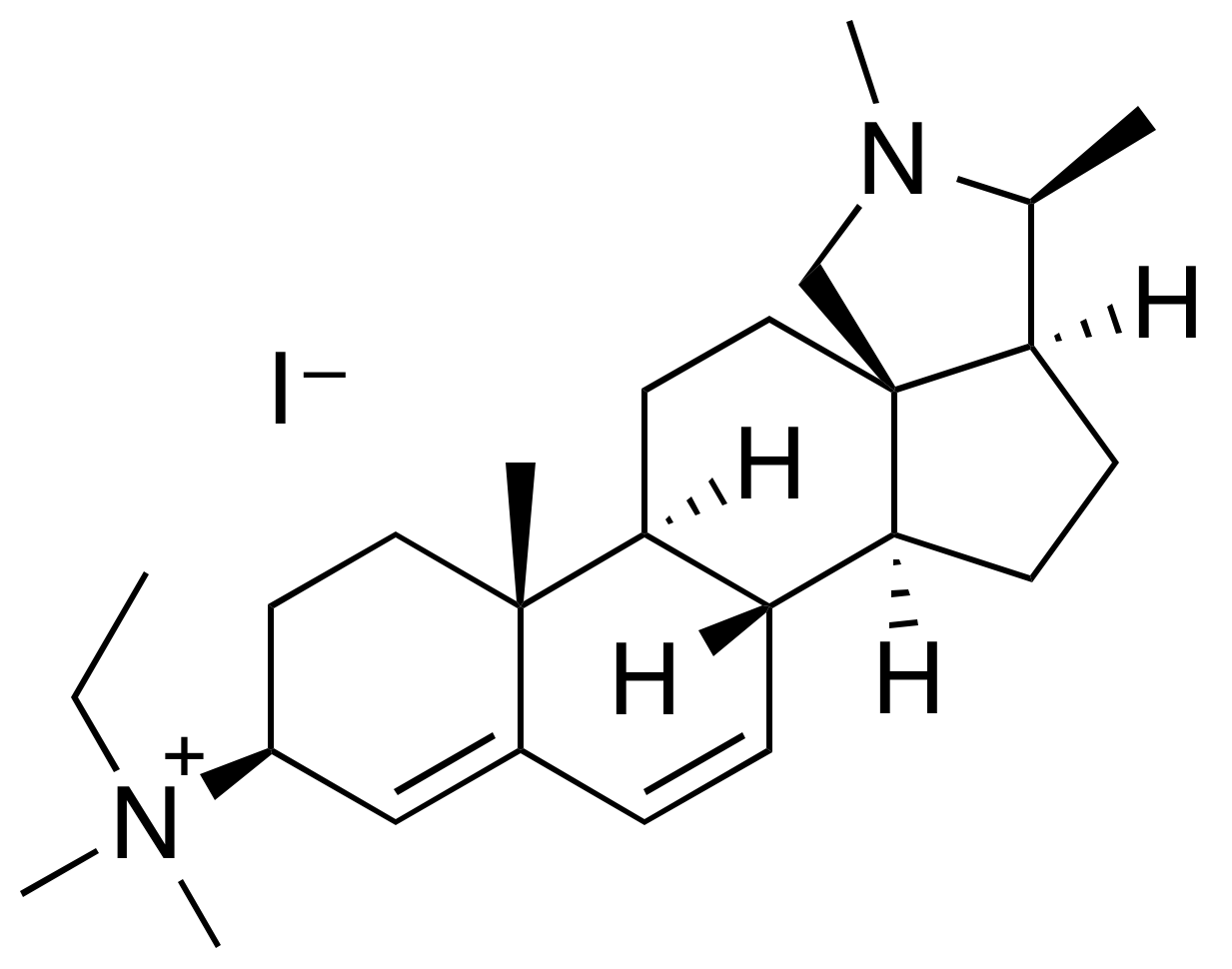

Clinical data
- Other names: MYC-1080; MYSC-1080

Identifiers
- IUPAC name: (3β)-N-Ethyl-N,N-dimethylcona-4,6-dienin-3-aminium iodide
- CAS Number: 30033-10-4
- PubChem CID: 71924
- ChemSpider: 64935
- UNII: K1477R7DDR
- CompTox Dashboard (EPA): DTXSID80952432

Chemical and physical data
- Formula: C_{26}H_{43}IN_{2}
- Molar mass: 510.548 g·mol^{−1}
- 3D model (JSmol): Interactive image
- SMILES: CC[N+](C)(C)[C@H]1CC[C@@]2([C@H]3CC[C@]45CN([C@H]([C@H]4CC[C@H]5[C@@H]3C=CC2=C1)C)C)C.[I-]
- InChI: InChI=1S/C26H43N2.HI/c1-7-28(5,6)20-12-14-25(3)19(16-20)8-9-21-23(25)13-15-26-17-27(4)18(2)22(26)10-11-24(21)26;/h8-9,16,18,20-24H,7,10-15,17H2,1-6H3;1H/q+1;/p-1/t18-,20-,21+,22+,23-,24-,25-,26-;/m0./s1; Key:NZMZXOUHSHDAQQ-VIGAWJBNSA-M

Stercuronium iodide (INN, USAN) (developmental code names MYC-1080, MYSC-1080) is an aminosteroid neuromuscular blocking agent which was never marketed. It acts as a competitive antagonist of the nicotinic acetylcholine receptor (nAChR), and is also reported to be an acetylcholinesterase inhibitor.
