= Abram Bennett =

American psychiatrist

- Born: 1898
- Died: 1985 (aged 86–87)
- Occupation: Psychiatrist

Abram Elting Bennett (1898–1985) was an American psychiatrist best known for his work on electroconvulsive therapy (ECT).

Bennett published over 50 research articles and several books, including Fifty Years in Neurology and Psychiatry (1972), Alcoholism and the Brain (1977) and Huguenots Migration: Descendants' Contributions to America (1984). In the 1930s, Bennett introduced the use of curare to prevent fractures and other adverse side effects caused by shock treatments. He also advocated pentylenetetrazol to induce convulsions in patients.

Bennett was affiliated with Johns Hopkins University, Bishop Clarkson Memorial Hospital in Omaha, Nebraska and the California Pacific Medical Center.

He contributed to the second edition of the Diagnostic and Statistical Manual of Mental Disorders and earlier was also one of the many consultants involved in the creation of the DSM-1.
