= Rudolf Boehm =

German pharmacologist (1844–1926)

Rudolf Albert Martin Boehm (Böhm) (19 May 1844, in Nördlingen – 19 August 1926, in Bad Kohlgrub) was a German pharmacologist, known for his work in the field of experimental pharmacology.

He studied medicine at the Ludwig-Maximilians-Universität München and the University of Würzburg, and from 1868 until 1870 served as an assistant to Franz von Rinecker at the Juliusspital in Würzburg. In 1871, he obtained his habilitation under Adolf Fick, then during the following year was named a professor of pharmacology, dietetics and history of medicine at the Imperial University of Dorpat. Later on, he worked as professor of pharmacology at Marburg University (from 1881) and Leipzig University (from 1884), where on four separate occasions he was named dean to the medical faculty. During his tenure at Leipzig University, he oversaw the construction of its pharmacological institute (1886–88). Today the institute at Leipzig University is known as the Rudolf-Boehm-Institut für Pharmakologie und Toxikologie.

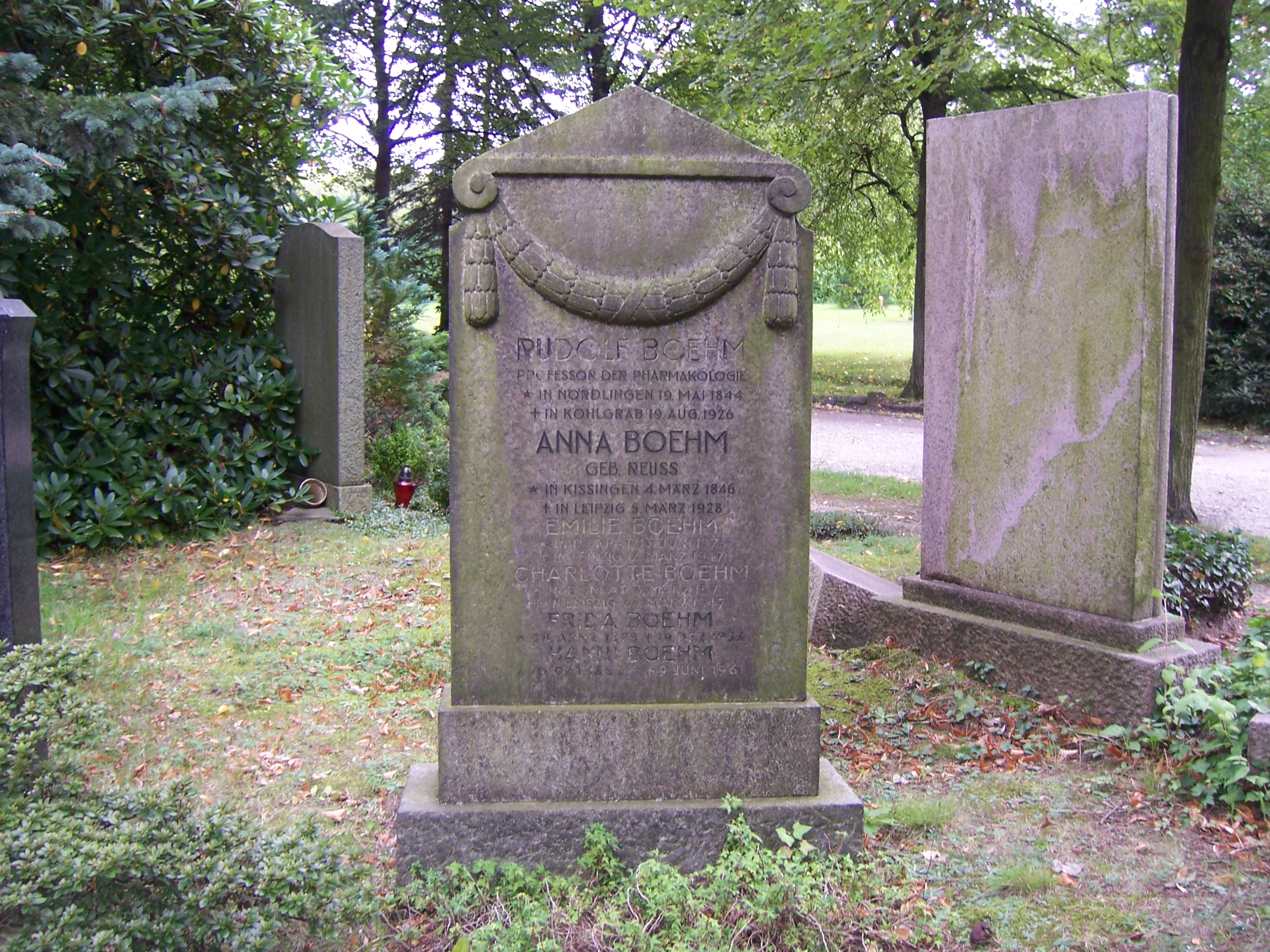
Gravesite of Boehm at the Südfriedhof in Leipzig.

His main research dealt with the pharmacological and toxicological properties of substances of plant origin and their effect(s) on the animal organism. He conducted extensive studies on the actions of digitalis, muscarine (a product of certain mushrooms), choline and curare. In 1895, he classified curare into three groups; "calabash curares" (usually taken from the family Loganiaceae, Strychnos species), "tubo curares" (derived from the family Menispermaceae) and "pot curares" (mixed Menispermaceae and Loganiaceae substances). He also performed significant research of carbohydrate metabolism.

== Selected works ==
- Die Physiologie und Pathologie der Seele (1870); German translation of Henry Maudsley's Physiology and pathology of the mind.
- Studien über Herzgifte, (1871).
- Handbuch der Intoxicationen (with Bernhard Naunyn and Hermann von Boeck), (1876).
- Lehrbuch der allgemeinen und speziellen Arzneiverordnungslehre für Studierende, Ärzte und Apotheker, (1884).
- Das Calebassencurare. Das Topfcurare. Über einige Curarerinden, (1897).
- Physiologische Untersuchungen über den Tod (1912); German translation of Xavier Bichat's Recherches physiologiques sur la vie et la mort.

He was also an editor of the journal Archivs für experimentelle Pathologie und Pharmakologie.
