= Daisuke Mori =

Japanese nurse (born 1971)

Daisuke Mori (守 大助, Mori Daisuke; born April 28, 1971) is a Japanese nurse, who was convicted for giving lethal doses of the muscle relaxant drug vecuronium to his patients in a clinic in Izumi-ku, Sendai, Miyagi Prefecture. Although he was convicted of only one murder, he is suspected to be a medical serial killer.

Mori was suspected of a murder of 89-year-old woman Yukiko Shimoyama on November 24, 2000. He was also suspected of four attempted murders; a 1-year-old girl on 2 February 2000, an 11-year-old girl on 31 October 2000, a four-year-old boy on 13 November 2000 and a 45-year-old man on 24 November 2000. He was arrested on January 6, 2001.

When he was arrested, he was reported to have murdered at least 10 people. However, he insisted on his innocence four days after his arrest. There were also many problems and mysterious deaths in his hospital, so his lawyers insisted that he was accused as their substitute. The U.S. newsmagazine Time criticized Japanese hospitals as well as him.

The district court in Sendai sentenced him to life imprisonment on March 30, 2004, for one murder and four attempted murders. Japanese police insisted that vecuronium's molecular mass is 258, but its correct molecular mass is 557. His defense pointed out this contradiction on the high court, but the high court in Sendai upheld the original sentence on March 22, 2006. He appealed to Supreme Court, which upheld the sentence on February 25, 2008.

== Books ==
- Boku wa yatte nai (Daisuke Mori, 2001) ISBN 4-7503-1440-4

== See also ==
- List of serial killers by number of victims
