= Curarea =

Scientific classification
- Kingdom: Plantae
- Clade: Embryophytes
- Clade: Tracheophytes
- Clade: Spermatophytes
- Clade: Angiosperms
- Clade: Eudicots
- Order: Ranunculales
- Family: Menispermaceae
- Subfamily: Menispermoideae
- Tribe: Tiliacoreae
- Genus: Curarea; Barneby & Krukoff

Species
- See text

Genus of flowering plants

Curarea is a genus of flowering plants in the family Menispermaceae, found in tropical parts of Central and South America. They are dioecious lianas, with at least some species producing toxic compounds such as curare.

== Species ==
Currently accepted species include:

- Curarea barnebyana R.Ortiz
- Curarea candicans (Rich. ex DC.) Barneby & Krukoff
- Curarea crassa Barneby
- Curarea cuatrecasasii Barneby & Krukoff
- Curarea gentryana R.Ortiz
- Curarea iquitana (Diels) R.Ortiz
- Curarea tecunarum Barneby & Krukoff
- Curarea tomentocarpa (Rusby) R.Ortiz
- Curarea toxicofera (Wedd.) Barneby & Krukoff
