= Harkishan Singh =

Indian pharmaceutical chemist

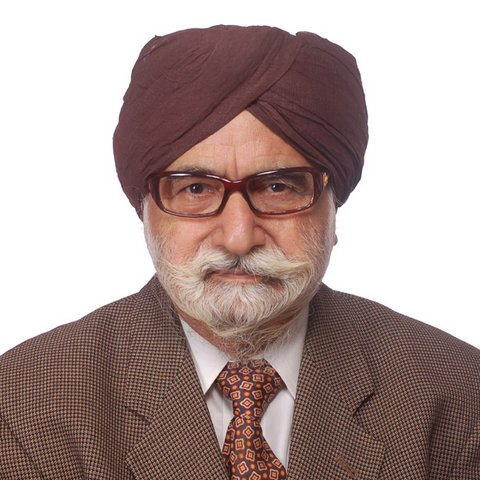
- Harkishan Singh, Indian pharmaceutical chemist and academic
- Born: 25 November 1928; Lyallpur District, India
- Died: 20 March 2020 (aged 91)
- Education: B.Pharm. Panjab University (1950); M.Pharm. Banaras Hindu University (1952); Ph.D. Banaras Hindu University (1956)
- Occupation: Pharmaceutical Chemist
- Notable work: Neuromuscular Blocker Candocuronium (Chandonium)
- Spouse: Gian Kaur
- Children: Tript P Singh (son) Dr. Manjeet Kaur (daughter)
- Relatives: Harinder S Panaser (son in law)
- Awards: Padma Shri (2017)
- Honours: D.Sc. (honoris causa) University of the Sciences (2014); D.Sc. (Honoris Causa) Panjab University (2016)
- Website: www.profharkishansinghfoundation.org www.profharkishansingh.com

Harkishan Singh (25 November 1928 – 20 March 2020) was an Indian pharmaceutical chemist and professor at Panjab University known for his research and teaching in India, United States, Canada, the United Kingdom and China. Singh specialized in organic chemistry, medicinal chemistry, and the study of natural products, making contributions to each field. During his career, he led the research group responsible for developing candocuronium iodide (also known as chandonium iodide, HS-310), a clinically useful synthetic azasteroid designed as a skeletal muscle relaxant.

== Neuromuscular blocker candocuronium ==
The research group led by Singh at Panjab University, Chandigarh, designed and synthesized candocuronium iodide, initially called chandonium iodide. Pharmacological testing was conducted at the University of Strathclyde.

Toxicity studies conducted at the Central Drug Research Institute (CDRI), Lucknow, did not reveal any adverse effects. Furthermore, clinical studies for the new compound were also completed at the CDRI. Additionally, the proceedings of the symposium on the clinical testing of candocuronium iodide were published in the Journal of Anaesthesiology Clinical Pharmacology, 10, 109–151 (1994).

As a result of these comprehensive studies, the drug, a non-depolarizing neuromuscular blocker with a short duration of action, was approved by the Indian Ministry of Health for manufacturing and clinical use. The World Health Organization assigned the drug the International Nonproprietary Name (INN): candocuronium iodide.

== Career ==
Singh lectured on his research at several institutions and conferences in India, the United States, Canada, the United Kingdom, and China. He delivered lectures at the Harvard School of Medicine and at the International Symposium on Molecular Structure, sponsored by the International Union of Crystallography in Beijing.

Singh was also a science historian, and he examined the history of pharmaceutical developments in India in the nineteenth and twentieth centuries. The topics of his history research included pharmacopoeias and formularies, pharmaceutical education, pharmacy practice, biographies of pharmaceutical luminaries, and pharmaceutical journalism. He published more than fifty articles.

In addition to his scientific and historical research papers, Singh authored or co-authored eighteen books and nearly two dozen review articles, including several book chapters. He wrote extensively on educational, scientific, historical, and professional issues. He published more than 300 works. Singh supervised nearly 50 masters and doctoral theses, supporting the growth of many pharmaceutical scientists. He also published 125 original scientific research papers, and had 14 patents granted.

Professor Singh served on several academic, scientific, professional and governmental bodies. This included the Committee of Education in Medicinal Chemistry of the International Union of Pure and Applied Chemistry (IUPAC), which prepared the Report on the International Education of Medicinal Chemists (IUPAC Technical Reports Number 13; 1974).

His affiliations with several scientific and professional organizations included emeritus membership of the American Chemical Society, life memberships of the Indian Pharmaceutical Association and Association of Pharmaceutical Teachers of India, and memberships of the American Institute of History of Pharmacy and British Society for History of Pharmacy.

Singh was inducted into the International Society for the History of Pharmacy.

== Employment ==
- Lecturer in Pharmaceutical Chemistry, Banaras Hindu University, 1953–56
- Assistant Professor of Pharmaceutical Chemistry, University of Saugar, 1956–64
- Postdoctoral Research Fellow in Pharmaceutical Chemistry, University of Maryland, U.S.A., 1958–61 (on leave of absence from the University of Saugar)
- Reader in Pharmaceutical Chemistry, Panjab University, 1964–72
- Visiting Professor and Research Fellow in Pharmaceutical Chemistry, University of Mississippi, U.S.A.1967–68 (on leave of absence from the Panjab University)
- Commonwealth Academic Staff Fellow, University of London, U.K., 1971–72 (on leave of absence from the Panjab University)
- Professor, Pharmaceutical Sciences (Pharmaceutical Chemistry), Panjab University, 1972–88
- Head, Department of Pharmaceutical Sciences, Panjab University, 1976–81
- Dean, Alumni Relations, Panjab University, 1979–84
- Dean, Faculty of Pharmaceutical Sciences, Panjab University, 1981–85
- Emeritus Fellow (University Grants Commission), Panjab University, 1989–92
- Professor Emeritus, Panjab University, since 2003

== Awards and honors ==
- 1975 Annual Award of the Shri Amrut Mody Research Foundation
- President, Indian Pharmaceutical Congress, Thirty-third Session (1981), Jaipur
- 1982 Acharya P.C. Ray Memorial Gold Medal Award Indian Pharmaceutical Association
- 1983 G. P. Srivastava Memorial Award, Association of Pharmaceutical Teachers of India, Nagpur
- 1984 Professor M. L. Khorana Lectureship, Indian Pharmaceutical Association, Bombay
- National Fellow, University Grants Commission, 1985–87; the only pharmaceutical academic to get this honour
- 1987 Ranbaxy Research Award in Pharmaceutical Sciences, Ranbaxy Research Foundation, New Delhi
- Elected Member, Academie Internationale d'Historie de la Pharmacie, 1995
- 1998 Schroff Memorial National Award, Indian Hospital Pharmacists' Association, New Delhi
- 1999 Eminent Pharmacist Award, Indian Pharmaceutical Association, Bombay
- Lifetime Achievement Award, Uttar Pradesh Technical University, 2006
- Lifetime Achievement Award, Chandigarh Science Congress, 2007
- Shri Bhojraj Panjamool Lifetime Achievement Award, Association of Pharmaceutical Teachers of India, Bangalore, 2007
- Lifetime Achievement Award, 59th Indian Pharmaceutical Congress, Banaras Hindu University, 2007
- Shri Ramanbhai B. Patel Foundation Lifetime Achievement Award, Indian Pharmaceutical Association, Mumbai, 2010
- Invited Lecture Delivered at Workshop on "Science in India in the 20th Century," Asiatic Society, Kolkata, 2011
- Doctor of Science (Honoris Causa) conferred by the University of the Sciences in Philadelphia, Philadelphia, Pennsylvania, U.S.A., 2014
- Lifetime Achievement Award, Punjab Academy of Sciences, Patiala, 2015
- Doctor of Science (Honoris Causa) conferred by the Panjab University, Chandigarh, India., 2016
- Padma Shri in Medicine in Jan 2017 by Govt. Of India for his notable work.
- "Professor Harkishan Singh Foundation".was initiated in 2023 on his 95th Birthday at Punjab University by her daughter Dr. Manjeet Kaur, son in law Mr. H S Panaser and grand daughters Ajooni and Alicia Kaur, under the section 501(C)(3) off the Internal Revenue Services.
- Two annual Scholarships / Awards were initiated for B. Pharma and a M. Pharma respectively at Punjab University, Chandigarh, India, where Professor Harkishan Singh spent majority of his life contributing to India as a Educator, Author, Historian, Researcher and a Humanitarian.
