= Dipyrandium =

Names
- Systematic IUPAC name 1,1'-Androstan-3β,17β-diylbis(1-methylpyrrolidinium)

Identifiers
CAS Number	(iodide salt): 33235-64-2
3D model (JSmol)	Interactive image; (iodide salt): Interactive image
PubChem CID	(iodide salt): 160227
UNII	(iodide salt): XMR4CN9YAU
- InChI: (iodide salt): InChI=1S/C29H52N2.2HI/c1-28-15-13-23(30(3)17-5-6-18-30)21-22(28)9-10-24-25-11-12-27(31(4)19-7-8-20-31)29(25,2)16-14-26(24)28;;/h22-27H,5-21H2,1-4H3;2*1H/q+2;;/p-2/t22-,23-,24-,25-,26-,27-,28-,29-;;/m0../s1 Key: MFQJSNKMXLSFCD-UADHMQRGSA-L
- SMILES: C[C@]12CC[C@@H](C[C@@H]1CC[C@@H]3[C@@H]2CC[C@]4([C@H]3CC[C@@H]4[N+]5(CCCC5)C)C)[N+]6(CCCC6)C; (iodide salt): C[C@]12CC[C@@H](C[C@@H]1CC[C@@H]3[C@@H]2CC[C@]4([C@H]3CC[C@@H]4[N+]5(CCCC5)C)C)[N+]6(CCCC6)C.[I-].[I-]

Properties
Chemical formula	C_{29}H_{52}N_{2}
Molar mass	428.749 g·mol^{−1}
- Except where otherwise noted, data are given for materials in their standard state (at 25 °C [77 °F], 100 kPa). Infobox references

Dipyrandium is an aminosteroid neuromuscular blocking agent.
