= Dihydrochandonium =

Names
- IUPAC name (4aS,4bR,6aS,8R,10aS,10bS,12aS)-1,1,10a,12a-tetramethyl-8-(1-methylpyrrolidin-1-ium-1-yl)-3,4,4a,4b,5,6,6a,7,8,9,10,10b,11,12-tetradecahydro-2H-naphtho[2,1-f]quinolin-1-ium
- Other names Duador

Identifiers
| CAS Number | dibromide: 70433-02-2 |
| 3D model (JSmol) | Interactive image; dibromide: Interactive image; diiodide: Interactive image |
| ChemSpider | dibromide: 137036; diiodide: 150132 |
| PubChem CID | dibromide: 155567 |
| CompTox Dashboard (EPA) | DTXSID70990641 |
- InChI: InChI=1S/C26H48N2.2HI/c1-25-14-12-21(28(5)17-6-7-18-28)19-20(25)10-11-22-23(25)13-15-26(2)24(22)9-8-16-27(26,3)4;;/h20-24H,6-19H2,1-5H3;2*1H/q+2;;/p-2/t20-,21-,22+,23-,24-,25-,26-;;/m0../s1 Key: ZLFADLFGBBXRJJ-SPPKVZINSA-L; dibromide: InChI=1S/C26H48N2.2BrH/c1-25-14-12-21(28(5)17-6-7-18-28)19-20(25)10-11-22-23(25)13-15-26(2)24(22)9-8-16-27(26,3)4;;/h20-24H,6-19H2,1-5H3;2*1H/q+2;;/p-2/t20-,21+,22+,23-,24-,25-,26-;;/m0../s1 Key: PDNBZMXDIQRBBZ-KMYXDLQKSA-L; diiodide: InChI=1S/C26H48N2.2HI/c1-25-14-12-21(28(5)17-6-7-18-28)19-20(25)10-11-22-23(25)13-15-26(2)24(22)9-8-16-27(26,3)4;;/h20-24H,6-19H2,1-5H3;2*1H/q+2;;/p-2/t20-,21-,22+,23-,24-,25-,26-;;/m0../s1 Key: ZLFADLFGBBXRJJ-SPPKVZINSA-L
- SMILES: C[C@]12CC[C@@H](C[C@@H]1CC[C@@H]3[C@@H]2CC[C@]4([C@H]3CCC[N+]4(C)C)C)[N+]5(CCCC5)C; dibromide: C[C@]12CC[C@H](C[C@@H]1CC[C@@H]3[C@@H]2CC[C@]4([C@H]3CCC[N+]4(C)C)C)[N+]5(CCCC5)C.[Br-].[Br-]; diiodide: C[C@]12CC[C@@H](C[C@@H]1CC[C@@H]3[C@@H]2CC[C@]4([C@H]3CCC[N+]4(C)C)C)[N+]5(CCCC5)C.[I-].[I-]

Properties
| Chemical formula | C_{26}H_{48}N_{2}^{−2} |
| Molar mass | 388.685 g·mol^{−1} |
- Except where otherwise noted, data are given for materials in their standard state (at 25 °C [77 °F], 100 kPa). Infobox references

Dihydrochandonium is an aminosteroid non-depolarizing neuromuscular blocking agent.
