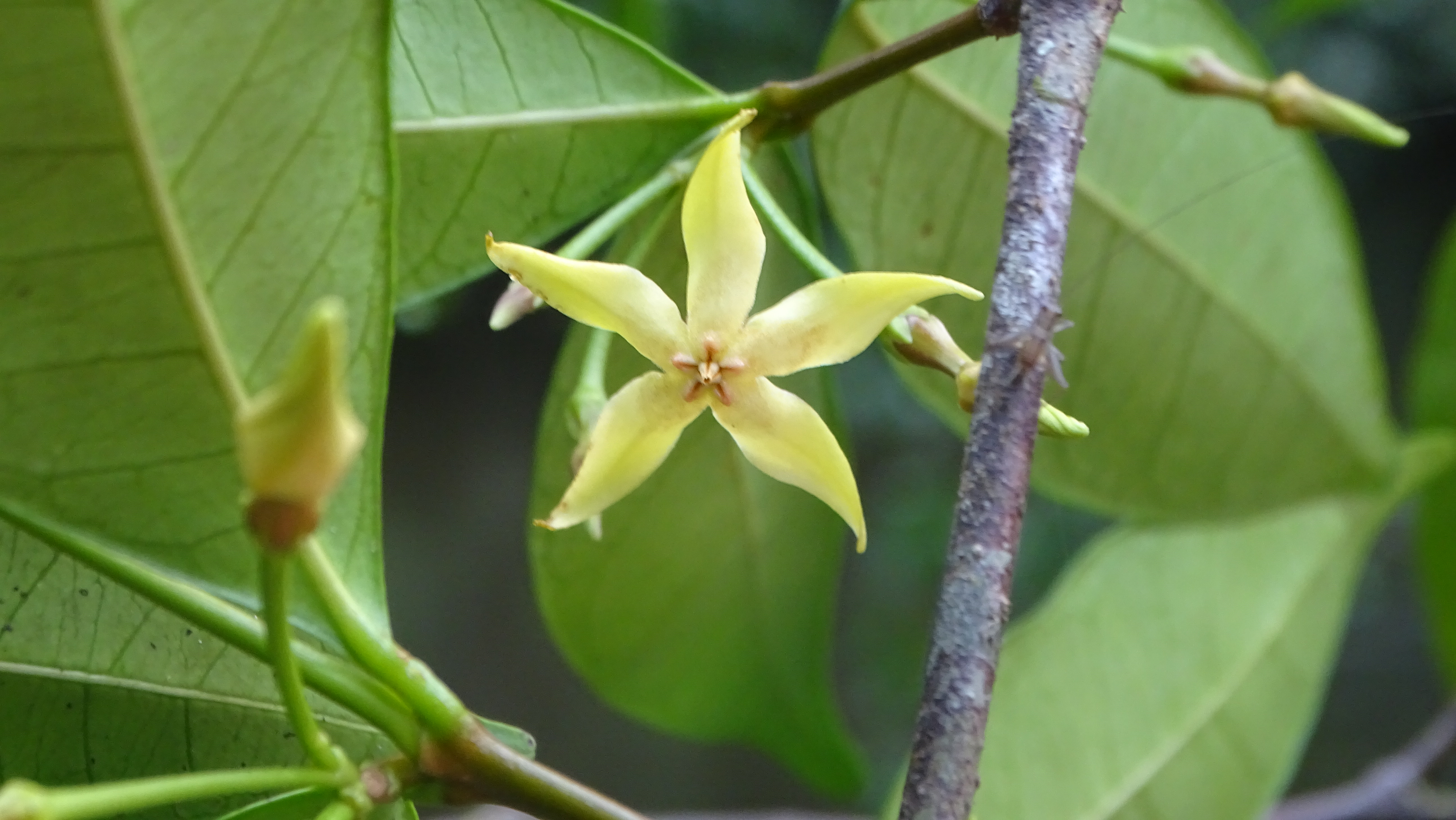
- Malouetia tamaquarina in French Guiana

Scientific classification
- Kingdom: Plantae
- Clade: Tracheophytes
- Clade: Angiosperms
- Clade: Eudicots
- Clade: Asterids
- Order: Gentianales
- Family: Apocynaceae
- Subfamily: Apocynoideae
- Tribe: Malouetieae
- Genus: Malouetia; A.DC.

Synonyms
- Robbia A.DC.; Malouetiella Pichon

= Malouetia =

Genus of plants

Malouetia is a genus of plants in the family Apocynaceae, first described as a genus in 1844. It is native to Africa, South America, Central America, and the West Indies.

Species

1. Malouetia amazonica M.E.Endress - Amazonas State in Brazil
2. Malouetia amplexicaulis Spruce ex Müll.Arg. - NW Brazil, Peru
3. Malouetia aquatica Markgr - NW Brazil
4. Malouetia arborea (Vell.) Miers - SE Brazil
5. Malouetia barbata J.Ploeg - Cameroon
6. Malouetia bequaertiana Woodson - C Africa
7. Malouetia bubalina M.E.Endress - Colombia
8. Malouetia calva Markgr. - S Venezuela, NW Brazil
9. Malouetia cuatrecasatis Woodson - Colombia
10. Malouetia duckei Markgr. - Amazon Basin
11. Malouetia flavescens (Willd. ex Roem. & Schult.) Müll.Arg. - St. Vincent, Venezuela, NW Brazil, Colombia, Peru, 3 Guianas
12. Malouetia gentryi M.E.Endress - N Peru
13. Malouetia glandulifera Miers - Amazon Basin
14. Malouetia gracilis (Benth.) A.DC. - Guyana
15. Malouetia gracillima Woodson - NW Brazil
16. Malouetia grandiflora Woodson - S Venezuela
17. Malouetia guatemalensis (Müll.Arg.) Standl. - Colombia, Central America
18. Malouetia heudelotii A.DC. - W + C Africa
19. Malouetia killipii Woodson - Peru
20. Malouetia lata Markgr. - NW Brazil
21. Malouetia mildbraedii (Gilg & Stapf) J.Ploeg - C Africa
22. Malouetia molongo M.E.Endress - S Venezuela
23. Malouetia naias M.E.Endress - Venezuela, Colombia, Peru
24. Malouetia nitida Spruce ex Müll.Arg. - W Venezuela, NW Brazil
25. Malouetia parvifolia Woodson - Venezuela
26. Malouetia pubescens Markgr. - Venezuela, Colombia, NW Brazil, Guyana
27. Malouetia pumila M.E.Endress - Roraima
28. Malouetia quadricasarum Woodson - Panama, Colombia, Peru
29. Malouetia sessilis (Vell.) Müll.Arg. - SE Brazil
30. Malouetia tamaquarina (Aubl.) A.DC. - Venezuela, Colombia, Brazil, 3 Guianas, Bolivia, Peru
31. Malouetia virescens Spruce ex Müll.Arg. - Venezuela, Colombia, NW Brazil

formerly included

- Malouetia asiatica Siebold & Zucc. = Trachelospermum asiaticum (Siebold & Zucc.) Nakai
- Malouetia riparia (Kunth) A.DC. = Tabernaemontana grandiflora Jacq.
- Malouetia tetrastachya (Kunth) Miers = Tabernaemontana siphilitica (L.f.) Leeuwenb.

== Uses ==
Malouetia tamaquarina is used as an additive to some versions of the hallucinogenic drink Ayahuasca.
