= Rocuronium bromide =

Non-depolarizing neuromuscular blocker

- Molecular structure of rocuronium

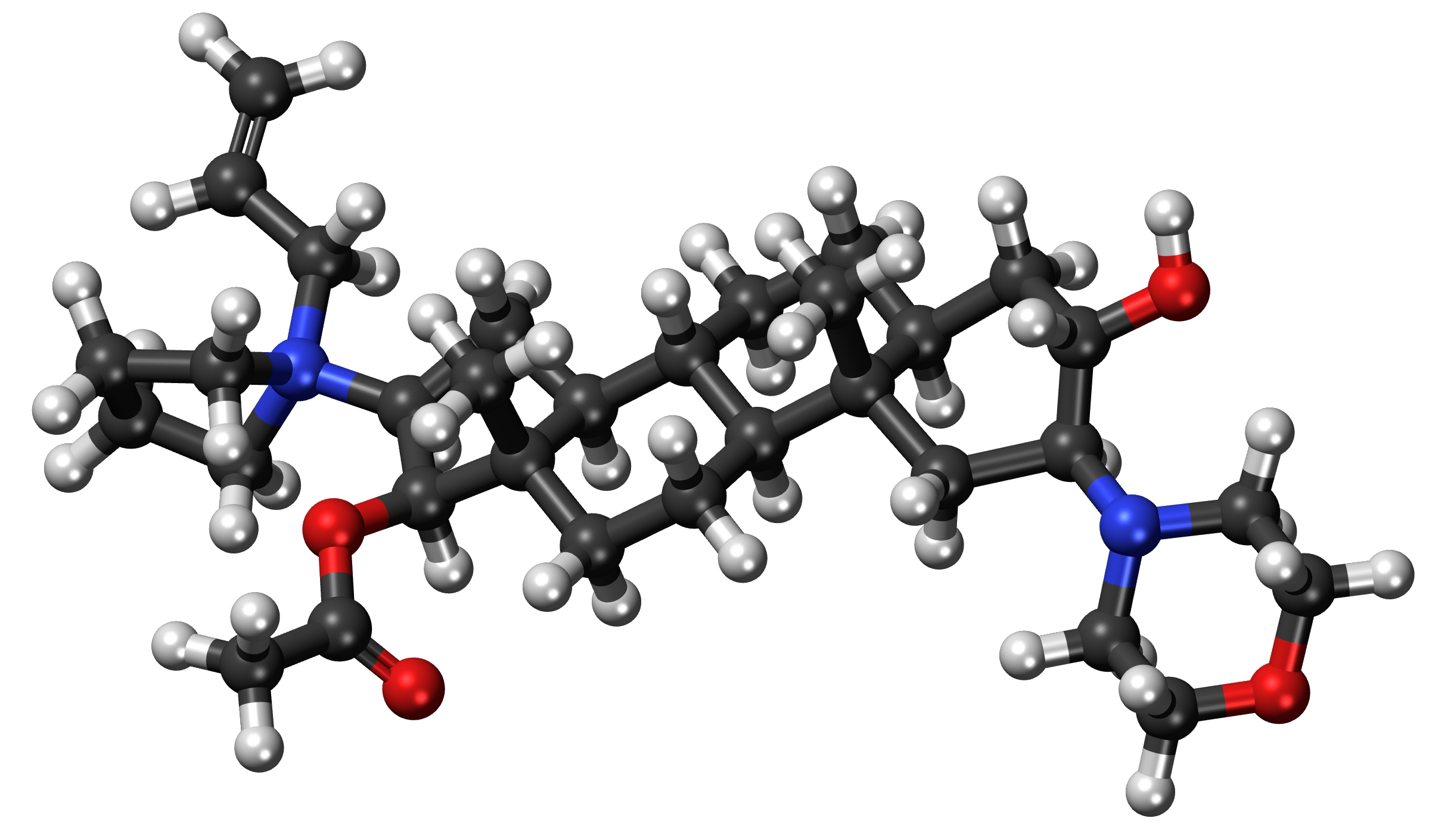
- 3D representation of a rocuronium molecule

Clinical data
- Trade names: Esmeron, Zemuron
- Other names: [3-hydroxy-10,13-dimethyl-2-morpholin-4-yl-16-(1-prop-2-enyl-2,3,4,5-tetrahydropyrrol-1-yl)-2,3,4,5,6,7,8,9,11,12,14,15,16,17-tetradecahydro-1H-cyclopenta[a]phenanthren-17-yl] acetate
- AHFS/Drugs.com: Monograph
- Routes of administration: Intravenous
- ATC code: M03AC09 (WHO)

Legal status
- Legal status: AU: S4 (Prescription only); UK: POM (Prescription only)

Pharmacokinetic data
- Bioavailability: NA
- Protein binding: ~30%
- Metabolism: some de-acetylation
- Elimination half-life: 66–80 minutes
- Excretion: Unchanged, in bile and urine

Identifiers
- IUPAC name: 1-((2S,3S,5S,8R,9S,10S,13S,14S,16S,17R)-17-acetoxy-3-hydroxy-10,13-dimethyl-2-morpholinohexadecahydro-1H-cyclopenta[a]phenanthren-16-yl)-1-allylpyrrolidinium bromide
- CAS Number: 119302-91-9
- PubChem CID: 441351
- IUPHAR/BPS: 4003
- DrugBank: DB00728
- ChemSpider: 390104
- UNII: I65MW4OFHZ
- KEGG: D00765
- ChEMBL: ChEMBL1201244
- CompTox Dashboard (EPA): DTXSID7023566
- ECHA InfoCard: 100.122.235

Chemical and physical data
- Formula: C_{32}H_{53}BrN_{2}O_{4}
- Molar mass: 609.690 g·mol^{−1}
- 3D model (JSmol): Interactive image
- SMILES: CC(=O)O[C@H]1[C@H](C[C@@H]2[C@@]1(CC[C@H]3[C@H]2CC[C@@H]4[C@@]3(C[C@@H]([C@H](C4)O)N5CCOCC5)C)C)[N+]6(CCCC6)CC=C.[Br-]
- InChI: InChI=1S/C32H53N2O4.BrH/c1-5-14-34(15-6-7-16-34)28-20-26-24-9-8-23-19-29(36)27(33-12-17-37-18-13-33)21-32(23,4)25(24)10-11-31(26,3)30(28)38-22(2)35;/h5,23-30,36H,1,6-21H2,2-4H3;1H/q+1;/p-1/t23-,24+,25-,26-,27-,28-,29-,30-,31-,32-;/m0./s1; Key:OYTJKRAYGYRUJK-FMCCZJBLSA-M

Rocuronium bromide (brand names Zemuron, Esmeron), also referred to as "roc", is an aminosteroid non-depolarizing neuromuscular blocker or muscle relaxant used in modern anaesthesia to facilitate tracheal intubation by providing skeletal muscle relaxation for surgery or mechanical ventilation. It is used for standard endotracheal intubation, as well as for rapid sequence induction. It can also be used with other drugs for medical assistance in dying.

== Pharmacology ==
=== Mechanism of action ===
Rocuronium bromide is a competitive antagonist for the nicotinic acetylcholine receptors at the neuromuscular junction. Of the neuromuscular-blocking drugs it is considered to be a non-depolarizing neuromuscular junction blocker, because it acts by dampening the receptor action causing muscle relaxation, instead of continual depolarisation which is the mechanism of action of the depolarizing neuromuscular junction blockers, like succinylcholine.

It was designed to be a weaker antagonist at the neuromuscular junction than pancuronium; hence its monoquaternary structure and its having an allyl group and a pyrrolidine group attached to the D ring quaternary nitrogen atom. Rocuronium has a rapid onset and intermediate duration of action.

There is considered to be a risk of allergic reaction to the drug in some patients (particularly those with asthma), but a similar incidence of allergic reactions has been observed by using other members of the same drug class (non-depolarizing neuromuscular blocking drugs).

The γ-cyclodextrin derivative sugammadex (trade name Bridion) is an agent to reverse the action of rocuronium by binding to it with high affinity. Sugammadex has been in use since 2009 in many European countries; however, it was turned down for approval twice by the US FDA due to concerns over allergic reactions and bleeding, but finally approved the medication for use during surgical procedures in the United States on December 15, 2015. The acetylcholinesterase inhibitor neostigmine can also be used as a reversal agent of rocuronium but is not as effective as sugammadex. Neostigmine is often still used due to its low cost compared with sugammadex; though as of July 2026 in the United States, sugammadex is available as a generic medication. Costs have decreased dramatically, prompting many hospitals and surgical centers to adopt the medication.

== History ==
It was introduced in 1994.

== Society and culture ==
=== Euthanasia ===
Since 2016, rocuronium bromide has been the standard drug, along with propofol, administered to patients for euthanasia in Canada.

=== Brand names ===
Rocuronium bromide is marketed under the brand name Zemuron in the United States and Esmeron in most other countries.
