= Pancuronium bromide =

Aminosteroid muscle relaxant

Pancuronium

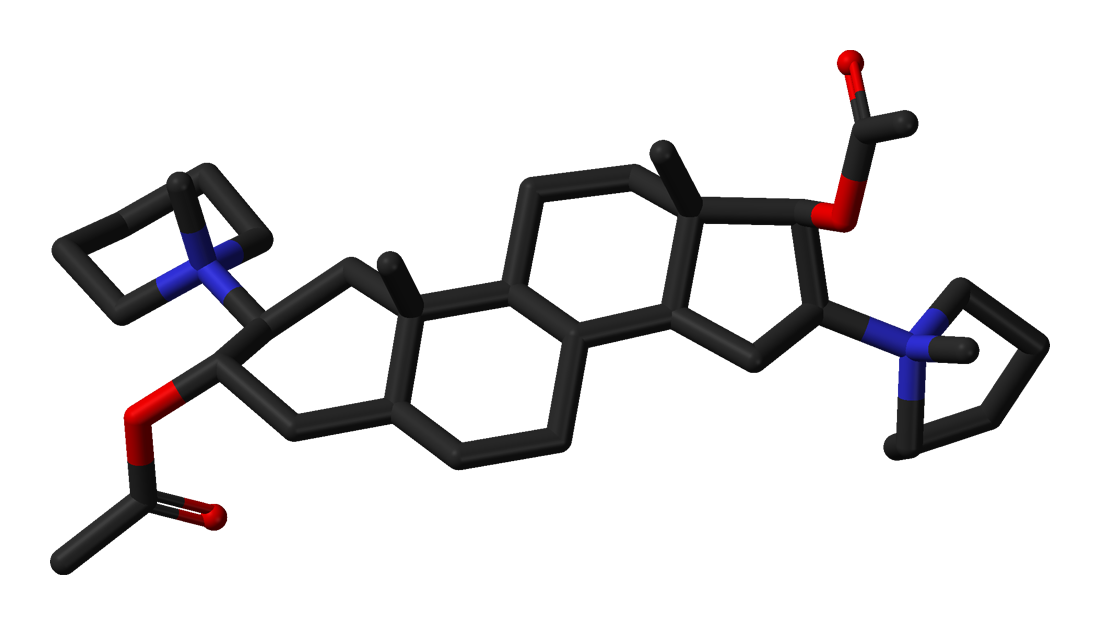

Clinical data
- AHFS/Drugs.com: Monograph
- Pregnancy category: AU: B2
- Routes of administration: Intravenous
- ATC code: M03AC01 (WHO)

Legal status
- Legal status: AU: S4 (Prescription only); UK: POM (Prescription only); US: ℞-only

Pharmacokinetic data
- Bioavailability: N/A
- Protein binding: 77–91%
- Metabolism: Hepatic
- Elimination half-life: 1.5–2.7 hours
- Excretion: Renal and biliary

Identifiers
- IUPAC name: [(2S,3S,5S,8R,9S,10S,13S,14S,16S,17R)-17-Acetyloxy-10,13-dimethyl-2,16-bis(pyridin-1-yl)-tetradecahydro-1H-cyclopenta[a]phenanthren-3-yl] acetate
- CAS Number: 16974-53-1; bromide: 15500-66-0
- PubChem CID: 441289
- IUPHAR/BPS: 4001
- DrugBank: DB01337
- ChemSpider: 25453
- UNII: J76UF062FS; bromide: U9LY9Y75X2
- KEGG: D00492
- ChEBI: CHEBI:7908
- ChEMBL: ChEMBL185073
- CompTox Dashboard (EPA): DTXSID9023415
- ECHA InfoCard: 100.035.923

Chemical and physical data
- Formula: C_{35}H_{60}N_{2}O_{4}
- Molar mass: 572.875 g·mol^{−1}
- InChI: InChI=1S/C35H60N2O4.2BrH/c1-24(38)40-32-21-26-13-14-27-28(35(26,4)23-31(32)37(6)19-11-8-12-20-37)15-16-34(3)29(27)22-30(33(34)41-25(2)39)36(5)17-9-7-10-18-36;;/h26-33H,7-23H2,1-6H3;2*1H/q+2;;/p-2/t26-,27+,28-,29-,30-,31-,32-,33-,34-,35-;;/m0../s1; Key:NPIJXCQZLFKBMV-YTGGZNJNSA-L

Pancuronium, sold under the brand name Pavulon, is an aminosteroid muscle relaxant with various medical uses. It is used in euthanasia and is used in some states as the second of three drugs administered during lethal injections in the United States.

== Uses ==
=== Medical ===
Pancuronium is used with general anesthesia in surgery for muscle relaxation and as an aid to intubation or ventilation. It does not have sedative or analgesic effects.

=== Euthanasia ===
In Belgium and the Netherlands, pancuronium is recommended in the protocol for euthanasia. After administering sodium thiopental to induce coma, pancuronium is delivered in order to stop breathing.

=== Execution ===
==== Procedure ====
Pancuronium is also used as one component of a lethal injection in administration of the death penalty in some parts of the United States.

==== Controversy ====
Like all non-depolarising muscle relaxants, pancuronium has no effect on level of consciousness. Therefore, if the anaesthetic used is insufficient, the individual may be awake but unable to cry out or move due to the effect of the pancuronium. There have been several civil lawsuits alleging similar failures of adequate anaesthesia during general surgical procedures. These have been largely due to improper or insufficient dosages of anaesthetic in concert with normal dosages of muscle relaxants such as pancuronium.

In 2007, Michael Munro, a Scottish neonatologist at Aberdeen Maternity Hospital, was cleared of malpractice by the General Medical Council Fitness to Practice panel after giving 23 times the standard dose of pancuronium to two dying neonates. Terminally ill, both dying babies were suffering from agonal gasping and violent body spasms, which was highly distressing for the parents to witness. Munro then administered pancuronium to the babies after advising the parents that this would ease their suffering and could also hasten death. It was on record that neither of the children's parents were unhappy with Munro's treatment.

Amnesty International has objected to its use in lethal injections on the grounds that it "may mask the condemned prisoner's suffering during the execution," thereby leading observers to conclude that lethal injection is painless, or less cruel than other forms of execution.

==== Export limitations ====
The United Kingdom bans the export of pancuronium bromide to the United States due to its use in lethal injections, but not to the Netherlands or Belgium.

== Adverse effects ==
Side effects include moderately raised heart rate and thereby arterial pressure and cardiac output, excessive salivation, apnea and respiratory depression, rashes, flushing, and sweating. The muscular relaxation can be dangerous in the seriously ill and it can accumulate leading to extended weakness. Pancuronium is not preferable in long-term use in ICU-ventilated patients.

== Mechanism of action ==
Pancuronium is a typical non-depolarizing curare-mimetic muscle relaxant. It competitively inhibits the nicotinic acetylcholine receptor at the neuromuscular junction by blocking the binding of acetylcholine. It has slight vagolytic activity, causing an increase in heart rate, but no ganglioplegic (i.e., blocking ganglions) activity. It is a very potent muscle relaxant drug, with an ED_{50} (i.e., the dose that causes 95% depression of muscle twitch response) of only 60 μg/kg body weight. Onset of action is relatively slow compared to other similar drugs, in part due to its low dose: an intubating dose takes 3–6 minutes for full effect. Clinical effects (muscle activity lower than 25% of physiological) last for about 100 minutes. The time needed for full (over 90% muscle activity) recovery after single administration is about 120–180 minutes in healthy adults.

The effects of pancuronium can be at least partially reversed by anticholinesterasics, such as neostigmine, pyridostigmine, and edrophonium.

== History ==
Workers at Organon were inspired by the structure of the aminosteroid alkaloid malouetine to develop a series of aminosteroid neuromuscular blockers based on an androstane nucleus, culminating in the development of pancuronium bromide.

Pancuronium is designed to mimic the action of two molecules of acetylcholine with the quaternary nitrogen atoms spaced rigidly apart by the steroid rings at a distance of ten atoms (interonium distance). Decamethonium and suxamethonium also have this same interonium distance.

== Society and culture ==
=== Uses in crime ===
Pancuronium was used in Efren Saldivar's killing spree. It was also used by the Skin Hunters to kill patients in the Polish city of Łódź. Pavulon was also used by Richard Angelo in 1987 to kill at least ten patients under his care at the Good Samaritan Hospital in New York.

== See also ==
- Malouetine
