= Instruments used in pathology =

Instruments used specially in pathology are as follows:

== Instrument list ==
Instrument	Uses
Flow cytometer	used for automated cell counting as in total blood count, differential count, etc.
Tissue bath or organ bath or Dale's apparatus	used in full tissue experiments, for example using guinea pig ileum mainly used in pharmacology for application of drugs to these tissues.
Sahli Haemoglobinometer	an old but rapid and simple method of hemoglobin estimation in the laboratories. Presently used in some places where sophisticated optical instruments are not available
Haemocytometer	a microscope associated apparatus used for manual counting of cells in body fluids like blood, etc. including for sperm count
Wintrobe's tube	used for ESR (Wintrobe's method), PCV, haematocrit, etc.
Westergren's tube and ESR stand	used for ESR (Westergren's method)
Disposable plastic molds or embedding molds (Leukart's L blocks) for tissue paraffin block making w.r.t. Histopathology	used to make blocks of tissue for cutting into thin slices for microscopy
Block holders (in histopathology)	used to hold the tissue blocks during cutting
•Refrigerated microtome (cryostat)	-do-; a special type that is used during operations to aid the surgeon in demarcating the diseased (specially neoplasms) tissue.
•Rocking microtome	-do-; a special type
•Base sledge microtome	-do-; a special type
•Ultra microtome	-do-; a special type
Tissue section floating baths (in histopathology)	used to spread the cut thin slices onto water using surface tension from where it is placed onto glass slides
Ryle's tube or nasogastric tube	used for nasogastric suction (or at times introduction of food or drugs). video link
FNAC needles	used for fine needle aspiration of material from inside the body; used for diagnostic examinations of the cells hence obtained; video link
Trephine biopsy needle	used for taking a biopsy from a deep hard tissue like bone marrow (within a hard bone)
Spirometer	used to test lung function; video link
•Water-seal type	-do-
•Douglas bag type	-do-
Peak flow meter or peak expiatory flow rate meter	used to test lung function by testing the rate at which the person can exhale; useful to diagnose COPD and asthma
Mercury or other manometers	used to measure pressure of a fluid within a cavity like the spinal canal, which is raised in certain diseases
Electrocardiogra	
Urinometer	Estimation of specific gravity of urine.
Esbach's Albuminometer	Quantitative analysis of albumin in urine sample.

== Gallery ==
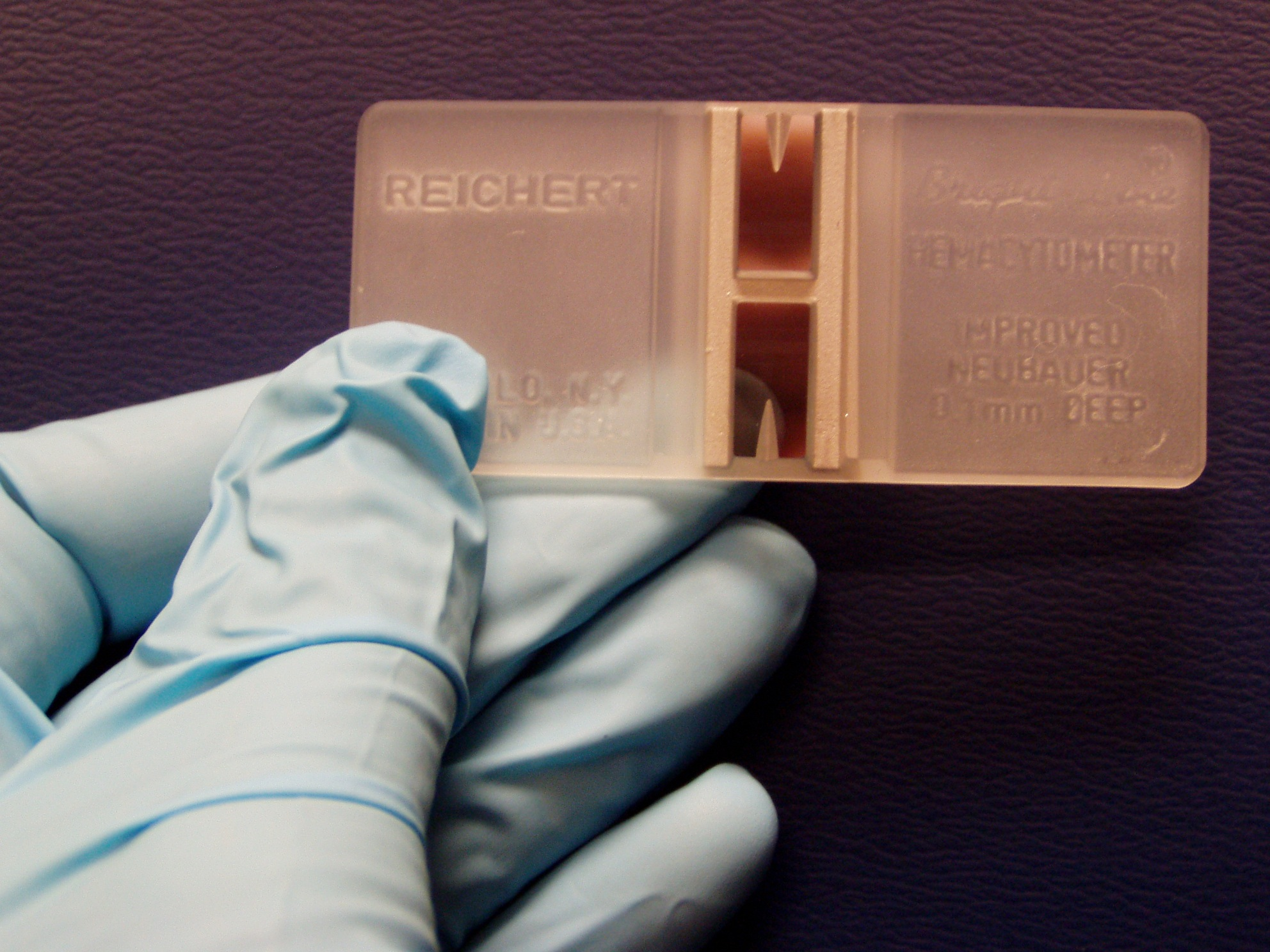
A hemocytometer

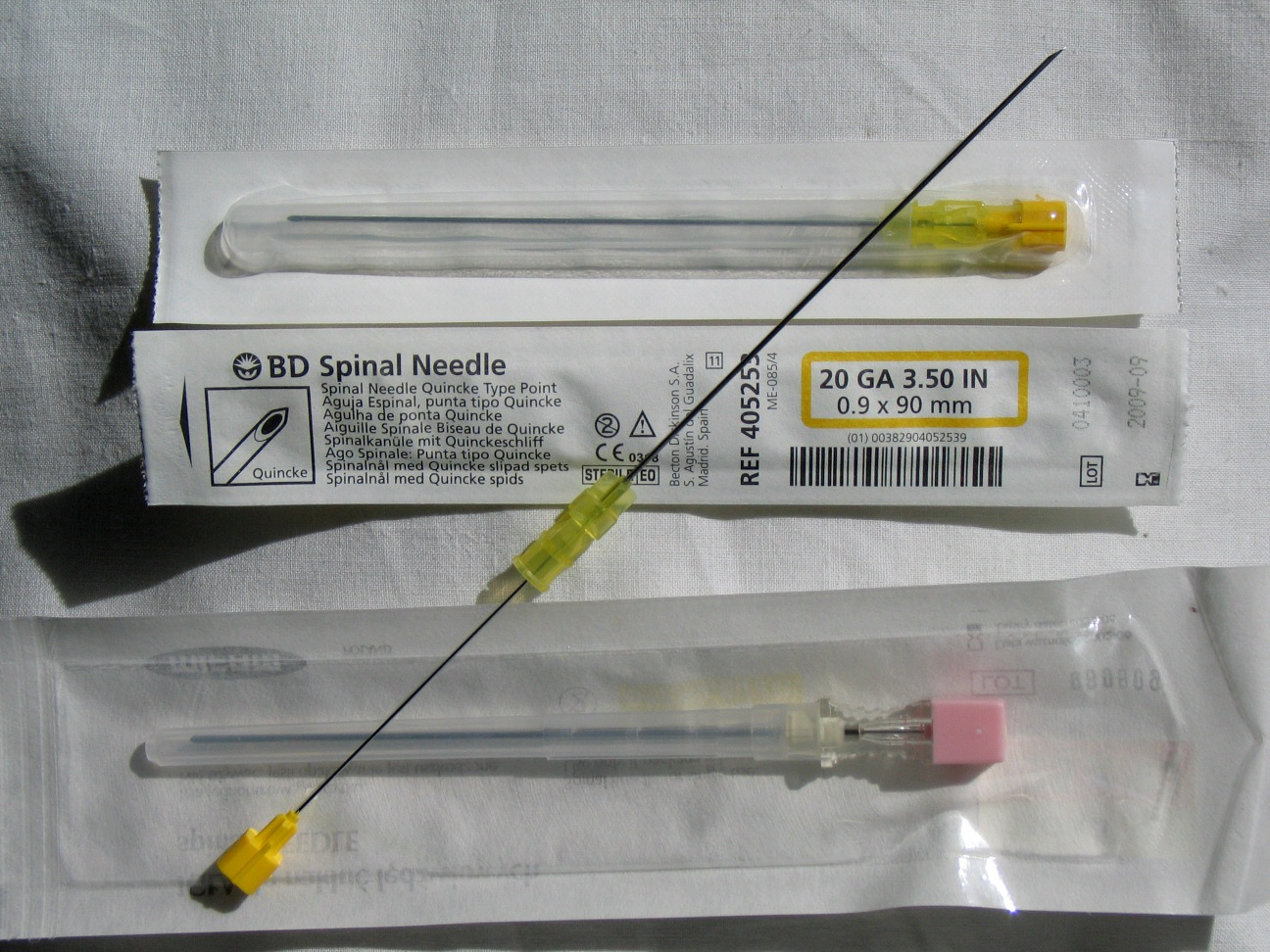
Spinal needles

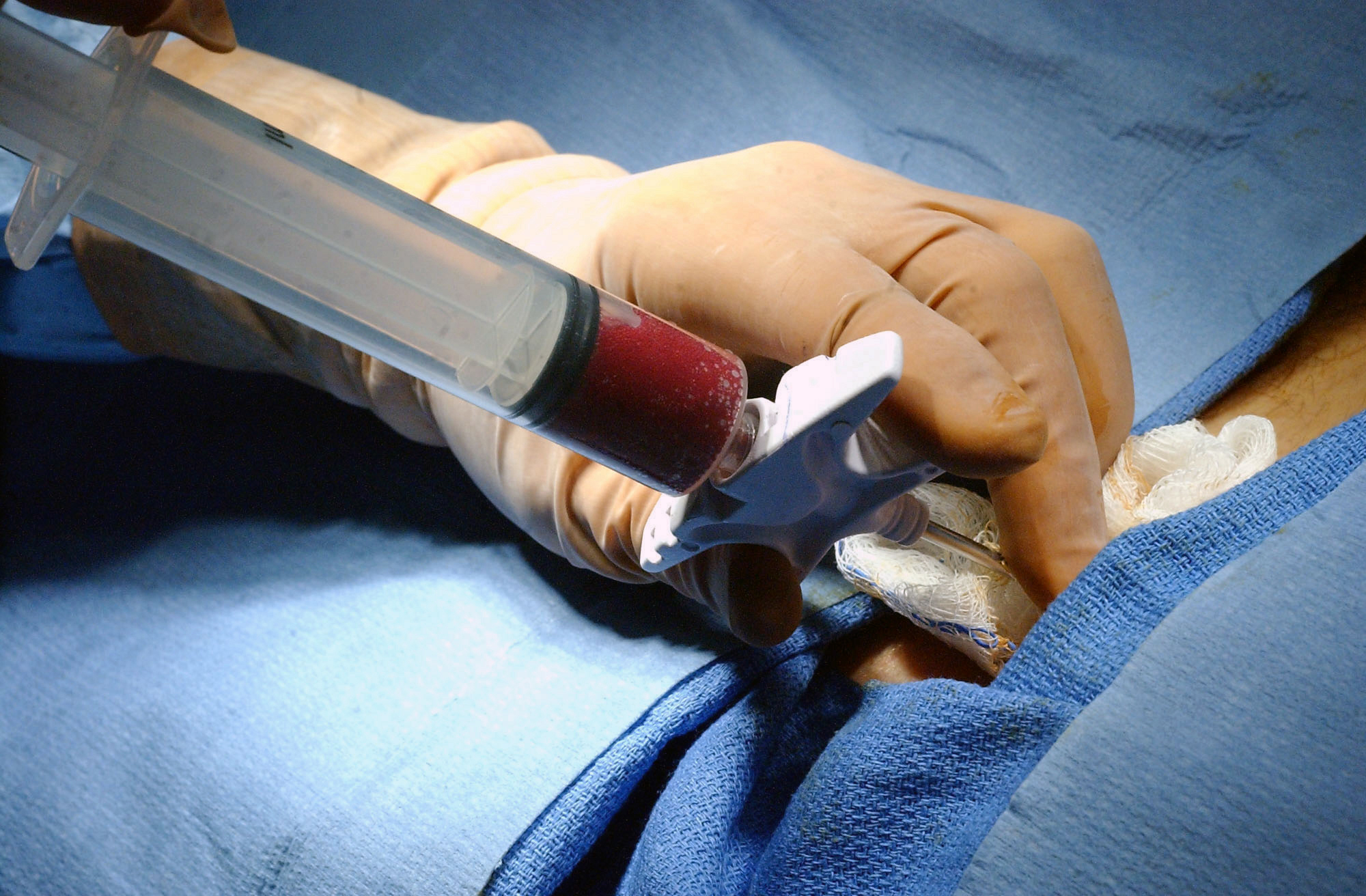
Marrow puncture

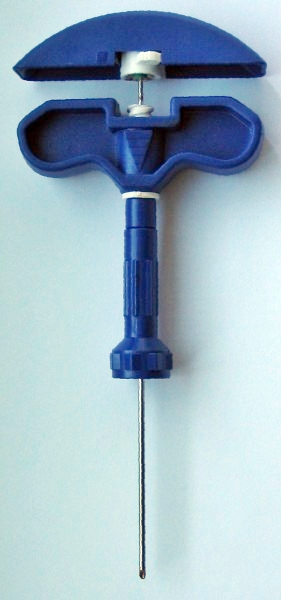
Bone marrow biopsy needle

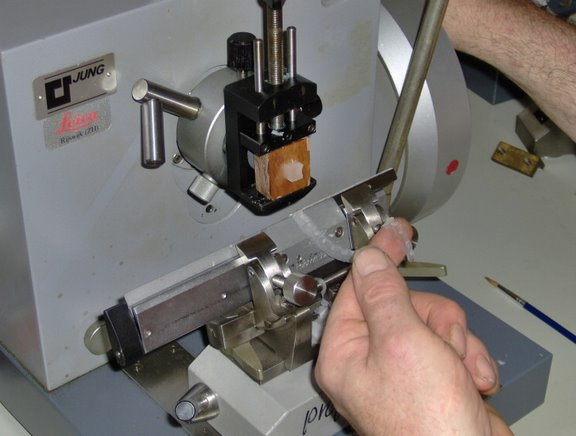
Rotary microtome

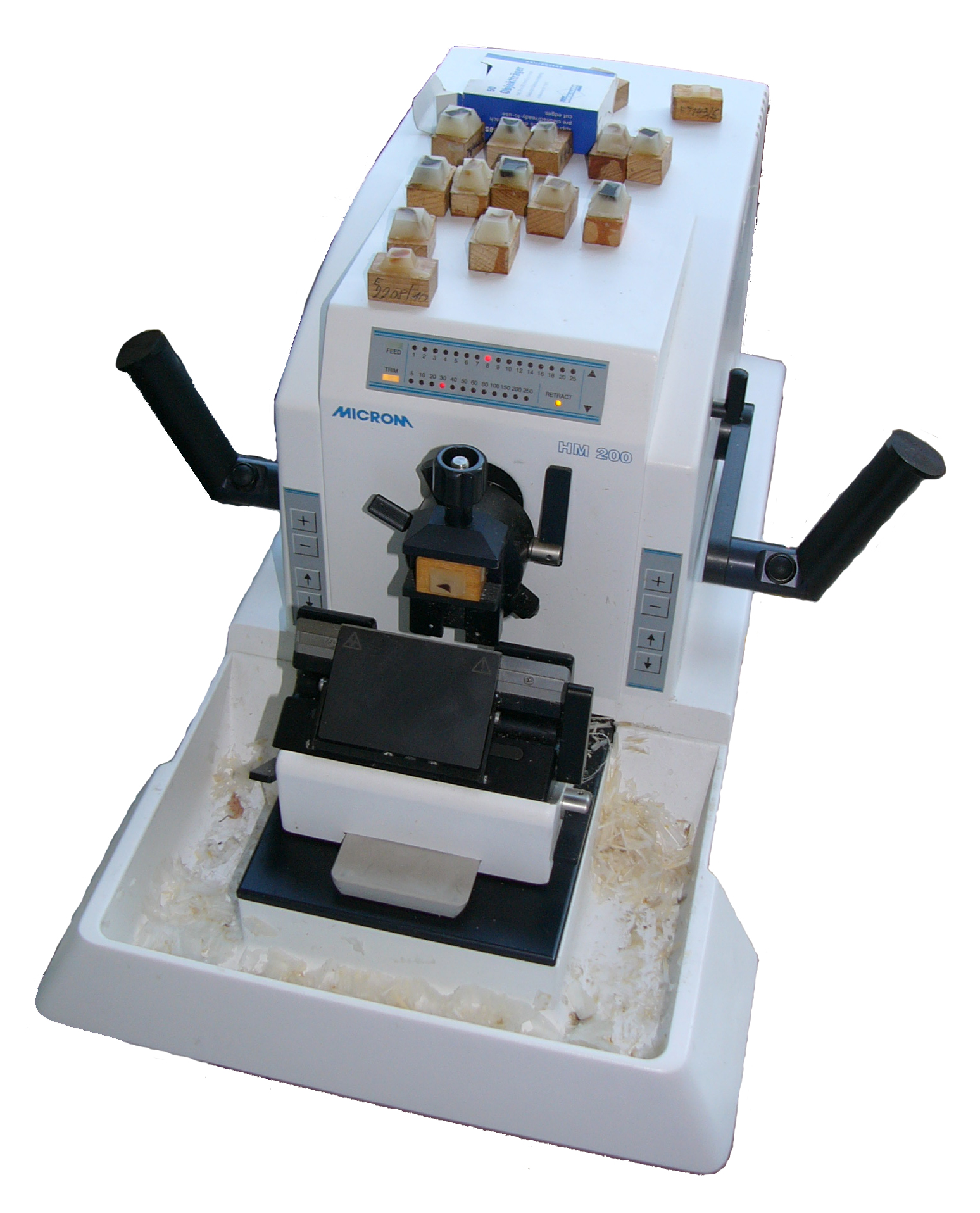
Electrical microtome

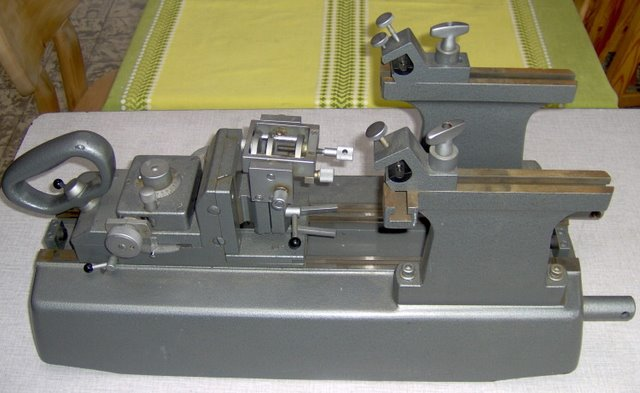
Base sledge microtome

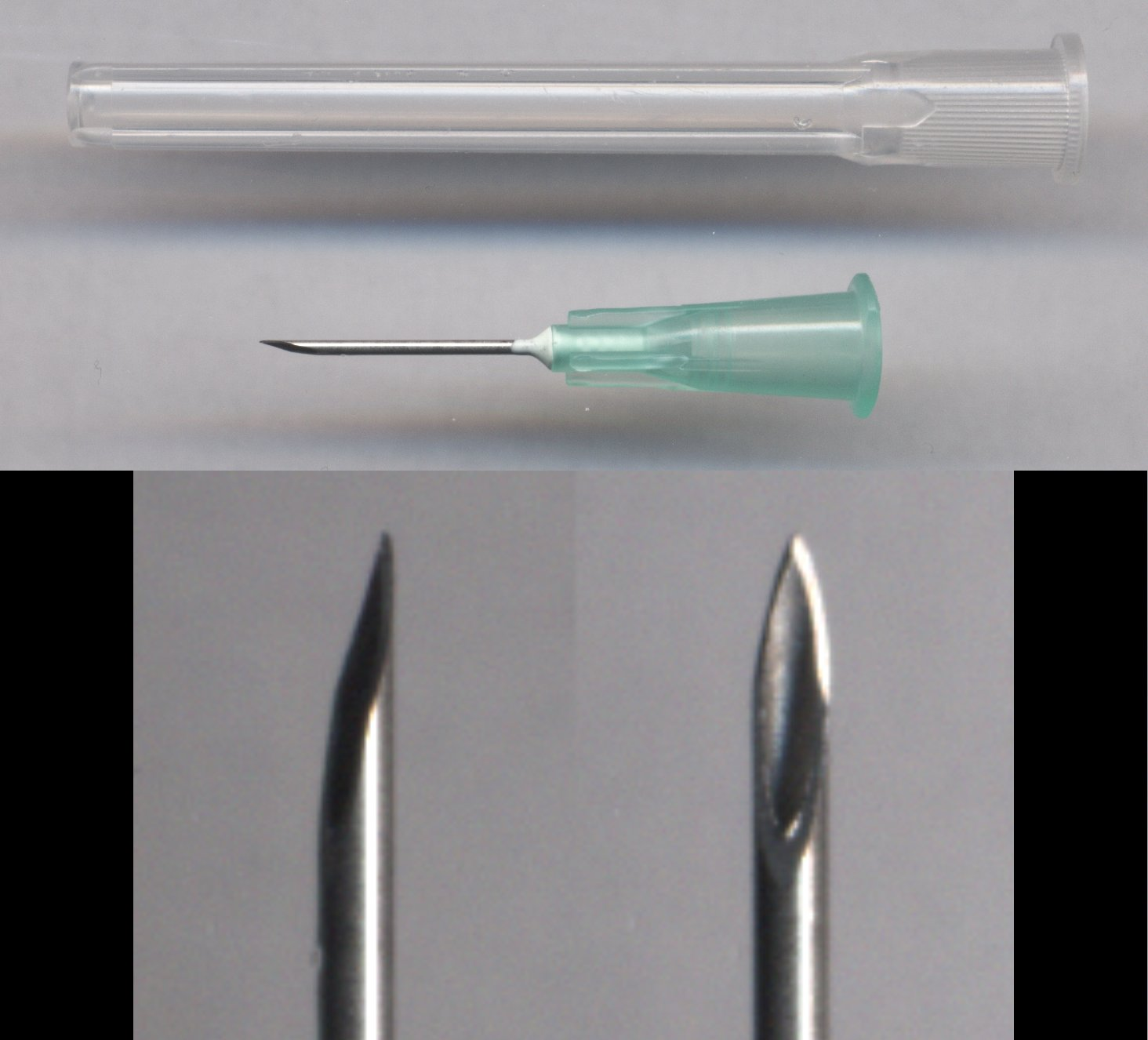
Hypodermic needle

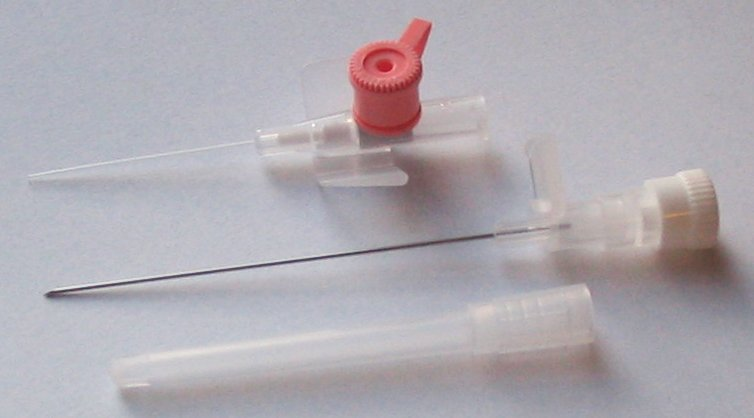
Intravenous cannula

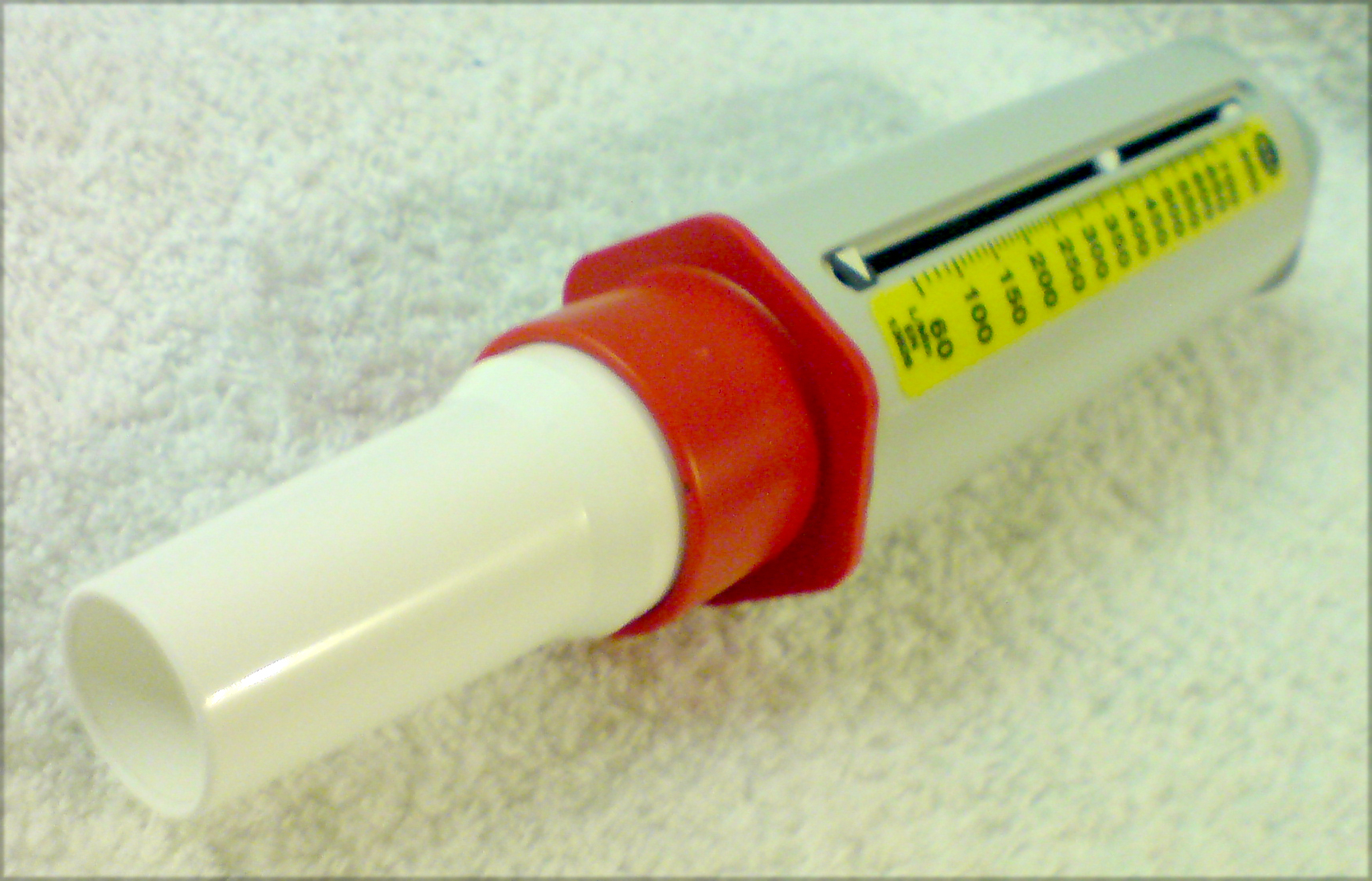
Peak flow meter

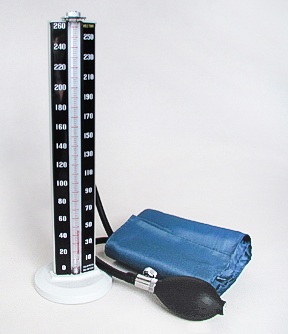
Blood pressure monitor

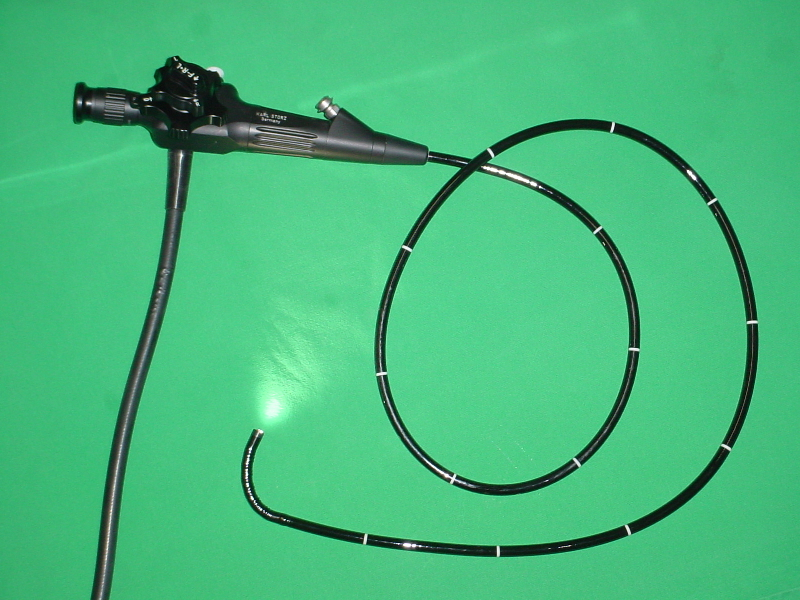
Flexible endoscope

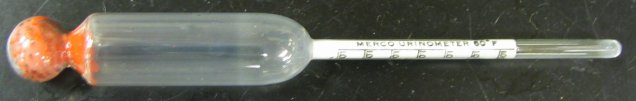
Urinometer
