= Postoperative residual curarization =

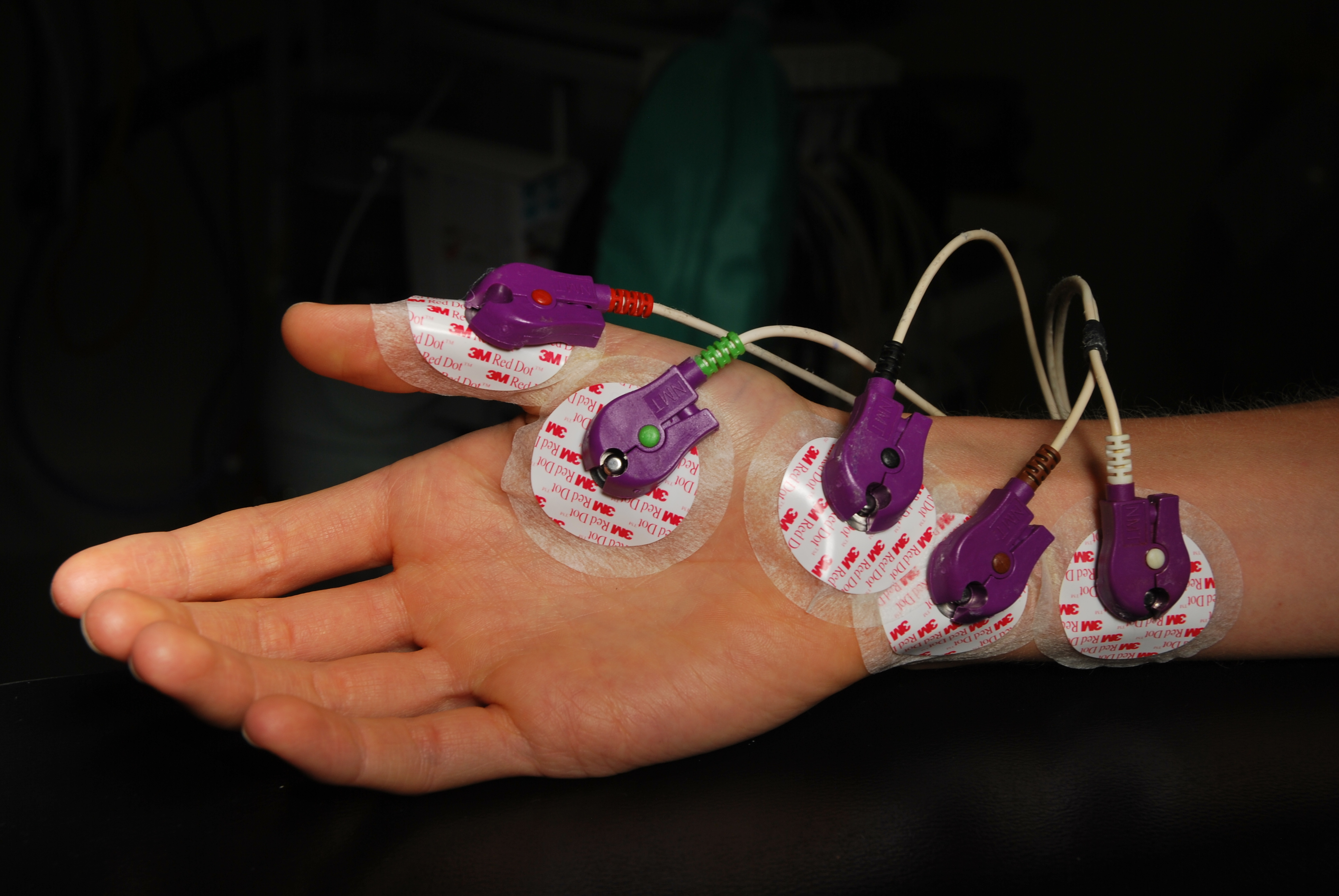
- Electromyographic monitoring at the adductor pollicis muscle.
- Specialty: Anesthesia

Postoperative residual curarization (PORC) or residual neuromuscular blockade (RNMB) is a residual paresis after emergence from general anesthesia that may occur with the use of neuromuscular-blocking drugs. Today residual neuromuscular blockade is defined as a train of four ratio of less than 0.9 when measuring the response to ulnar nerve stimulation at the adductor pollicis muscle using mechanomyography or electromyography. A meta-analysis reported that the incidence of residual neuromuscular paralysis was 41% in patients receiving intermediate neuromuscular blocking agents during anaesthesia. It is possible that > 100,000 patients annually in the USA alone, are at risk of adverse events associated with undetected residual neuromuscular blockade. Neuromuscular function monitoring and the use of the appropriate dosage of sugammadex to reverse blockade produced by rocuronium can reduce the incidence of postoperative residual curarization. In this study, with usual care group receiving reversal with neostigmine resulted in a residual blockade rate of 43%.

== Incidence ==
Multiple studies have demonstrated that incomplete reversal of NMBDs is an important risk factor for postoperative morbidity and mortality. Multiple studies have shown that postoperative residual curarization in the post-anesthesia care unit (PACU) is a common complication, with 40% of patients exhibiting signs of residual paralysis. The incidence of this complication continues to be high and does not seem to be decreasing over time.

== Types of neuromuscular blocking agents ==
Classified into two main groups:

•Depolarizing NMBDs: produces skeletal muscle relaxation by binding directly with nAChRs to cause prolonged depolarization.

•Non-depolarizing NMBDs: competitive antagonists (competing with acetylcholine [ACh] for the binding sites at the nAChRs), preventing the initiation of action potential.

=== Non-depolarizing neuromuscular blocking agents ===
Non-depolarizing NMBAs are classified based on their duration of action (short, intermediate, or long-acting agents. The two most commonly used non-depolarizing NMBDs in the operating room are rocuronium and vecuronium. Both are intermediate-acting, steroidal NMBAs. Vecuronium and rocuronium can be reversed by anticholinesterases (neostigmine) or sugammadex. If sufficient spontaneous recovery has not been achieved, neostigmine (or sugammadex) should be administered.

=== Depolarizing neuromuscular blocking agents ===
Succinylcholine is the only depolarizing NMBA available for clinical use. It produces a neuromuscular blockade that is the fastest in onset and has the shortest duration of all NMBDs. Due to these properties, succinylcholine is often used for rapid sequence induction and intubation. When a continuous infusion, repeated doses, or a large dose of succinylcholine (>4 mg/kg) is used, the risk of a Phase II block and prolonged paralysis is increased. This type of block occurs when the desensitizing phase sets in and the muscle is no longer responsive to acetylcholine and full neuromuscular blockade is achieved. TOF fade is indicative of phase II block that is likely to occur in patients who received succinylcholine and may resemble features of a nondepolarizing block. During phase II, reversal with neostigmine should not be attempted. Anticholinesterase agents can worsen paralysis in this setting. Prolonged paralysis after succinylcholine administration may be due to butyrylcholinesterase (pseudocholinesterase) deficiency and may require prolonged mechanical ventilation. Unlike non-depolarizing NMBDs, reversal with neostigmine should not be attempted and sugammadex will have no effect on recovery.

== Adverse events from inadequate neuromuscular blockade reversal ==
Inadequate reversal of NMBAs is an important risk factor for anesthesia related complications. Even small degrees of residual paralysis are associated with weakness of upper airway muscles which may lead to airway obstruction and increased risk of aspiration. The hypoxic ventilatory response (HRV) can also be severely depressed as well leading to hypoxemia and need for reintubation. Studies have shown that incomplete neuromuscular recovery is associated with an increased risk of pulmonary complications. A prospective observational study including patients who underwent general anesthesia for noncardiac surgery reported that the "use of NMBAs was independently associated with an increase in postoperative pulmonary complications within 28 days of surgery."

== Monitoring neuromuscular blockade ==
=== Peripheral nerve stimulation patterns and definitions ===
==== Train-of-four (TOF) ====
TOF stimulation consists of four successive supramaximal stimuli delivered at 2 Hz. After administration of a nondepolarizing NMBD, responses at this frequency progressively decrease in amplitude (referred to as "fade" or a decrease in the TOF ratio from a normal ratio of 1).

==== Train-of-four ratio (TOFR) ====
A TOF ratio (TOFR) is calculated by dividing the amplitude of the fourth response by the amplitude of the first response (requires an quantitative measure of the response to stimulation).

==== Train-of-four count (TOFC) ====
The TOF count (TOFC) is defined as the "number of detectable evoked responses, and it correlates with the degree of neuromuscular block, as follows:

- TOFC = 1 : >95 percent of nicotinic acetylcholine receptors (nAChRs) blocked
- TOFC = 2 : 85 to 90 percent of nAChRs blocked
- TOFC = 3 : 80 to 85 percent of nAChRs blocked
- TOFC = 4 : 70 to 75 percent of nAChRs blocked

==== Train-of-four ratio <0.9 ====
Data suggests that a TOF ratio measured qualitatively with EMG, MMG, or AMG must reach the threshold value of >0.9 to assure recovery of neuromuscular function. TOF ratios <0.9 are associated with residual blockade and paralysis and have demonstrated an increased risk of aspiration.

=== Subjective monitoring ===
Subjective monitoring refers to the clinical evaluation of assessing the TOFC or degree of fade by using methods such as physically touching the patient and feeling movement or visibly observing a twitch in response to neurostimulation provided by a peripheral nerve stimulator. If subjective monitoring is used, its limitations should be recognized: "clinicians tend to overestimate the TOFC when using subjective evaluation, especially at moderate levels of block. Likewise, the level of fade is difficult to detect subjectively, with most clinicians unable to detect fade when TOF ratios >0.4."

=== Objective/quantitative monitoring ===
Due to the difficulty detecting fade subjectively (TOF ratios between 0.4 and 0.9) when using peripheral nerve stimulators, clinicians are unable to reliably exclude residual neuromuscular blockade. TOF ratios >0.4 can be measured accurately and displayed numerically using quantitative neuromuscular monitoring. However, TOF ratios >4 can be measured accurately by using quantitative monitoring methods such as electromyography (EMG), kinemyography (KMG), phonomyography (PMG), and acceleromyography (AMG).

== Reversal of NMBDs and methods to avoid residual neuromuscular blockade ==
•Using short-acting or intermediate-acting NBMDs whenever possible can decrease the risk of residual neuromuscular blockade when compared with long-acting NMBDs.

•Use objective neuromuscular monitoring (acceleromyography, electromyography, kinemyography) if possible. Peripheral nerve stimulators may be more readily available and can be used as well. However, peripheral nerve stimulators can only subjectively determine the depth of block (train-of-four count) and cannot provide accurate information needed for the timing and dosing of reversal agents as well as ensure full recovery (TOF fade).

•If spontaneous recovery has not reached a TOFC = 4, use sugammadex rather than neostigmine for reversal of steroidal NMBDs.

•If sugammadex is unavailable, wait for spontaneous recovery to achieve a TOFC = 4 before administering neostigmine.

•Extubate the trachea only after a TOFR ≥0.9 is achieved (if quantitative monitors are available)

•If objective monitoring is not available, administer reversal agents (neostigmine) only when TOFC = 4. Wait at least 10 minutes after neostigmine is given to ensure enough time for the neuromuscular blockade to be fully reversed before tracheal extubation.
