= Acceleromyograph =

Used to measure the force produced by a muscle

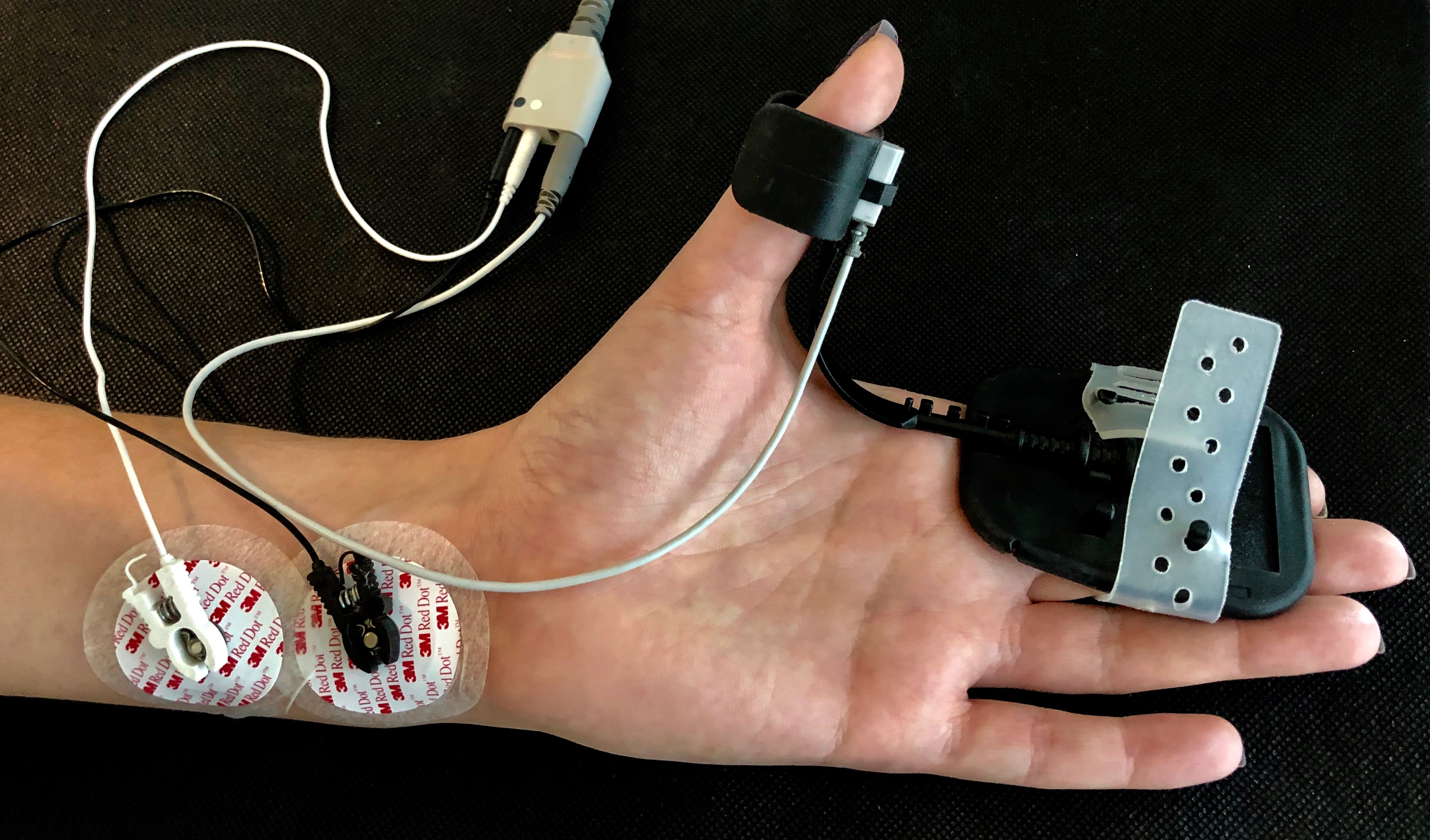
Acceleromyography - Quantitative neuromuscular monitoring using the TOF-Watch.

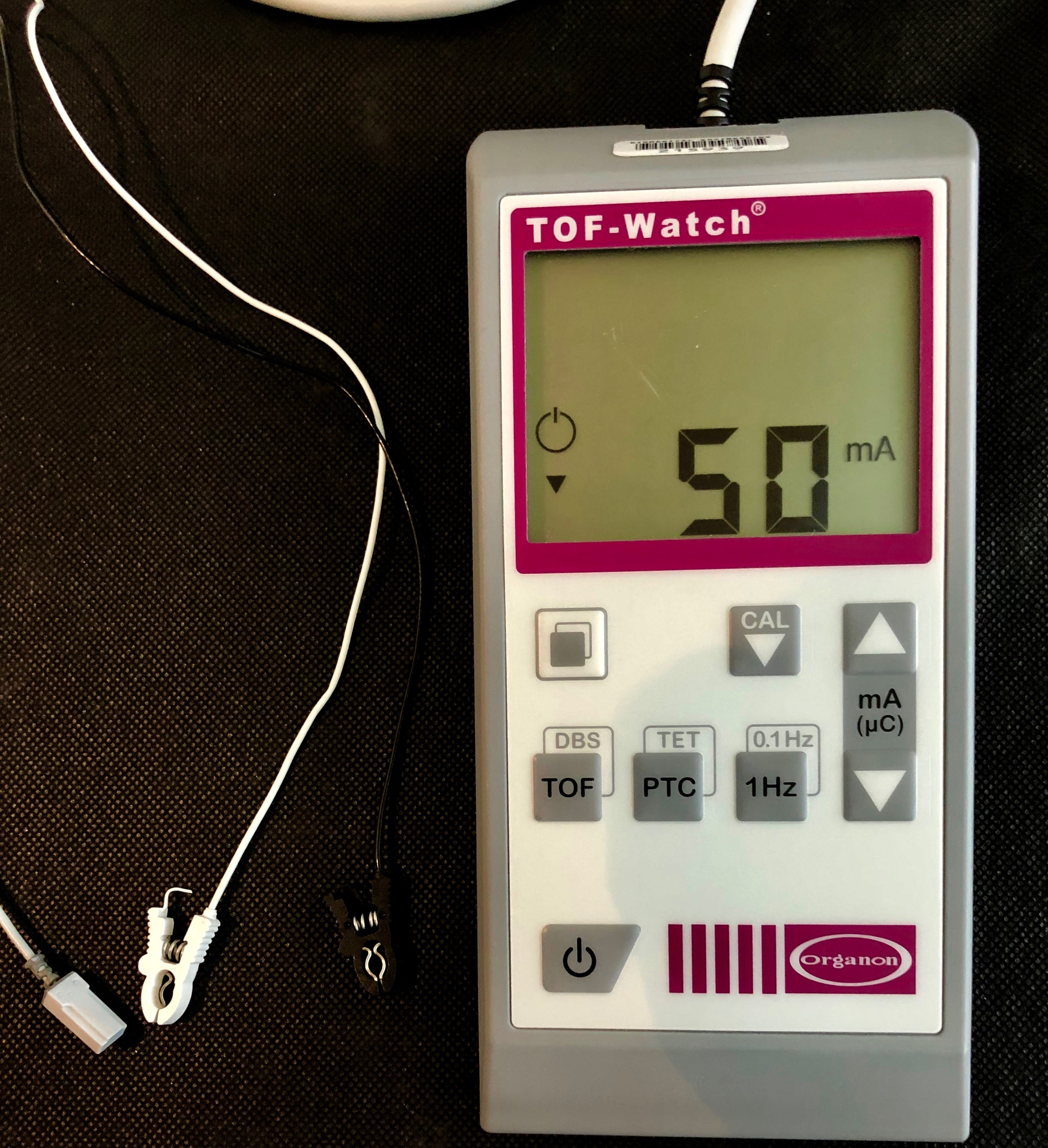
Acceleromyography using the TOF- Watch

An acceleromyograph is a piezoelectric myograph, used to measure the force produced by a muscle after it has undergone nerve stimulation. Acceleromyographs may be used, during anaesthesia when muscle relaxants are administered, to measure the depth of neuromuscular blockade and to assess adequacy of recovery from these agents at the end of surgery. Acceleromyography is classified as quantitative neuromuscular monitoring.

== Rationale ==
Patients who undergo anesthesia may receive a drug that paralyzes muscles, facilitating endotracheal intubation and improving operating conditions for the surgeon. Longer-acting drugs have higher prevalence of residual blockade in the PACU or ICU than shorter acting drugs. Different clinical tests to measure or exclude evidence of residual muscle weakness have been described but cannot exclude postoperative residual curarization. Small degrees of muscle blockade can only accurately be measured by the use of quantitative neuromuscular monitoring. Specifically, the observer cannot reliably measure muscular fade when train-of-four ratios are between 0.4 and 0.9.

== Acceleromyograph design ==
Acceleromyographs measure muscle activity using a miniature piezoelectric transducer that is attached to the stimulated muscle. A voltage is created when the muscle accelerates and that acceleration is proportion to force of contraction. The mass of the piezoelectric transducer is known and the acceleration is measured therefore the force can be calculated, (Force = mass × acceleration). Acceleromyographs are more costly than the more common twitch monitors, but have been shown to better alleviate residual blockade and associated symptoms of muscle weakness, and to improve overall quality of recovery.

== See also ==
- Muscle relaxant
- Myograph
- Neuromuscular-blocking drug
- Neuromuscular monitoring
