= Neuromuscular monitoring =

Medical technique

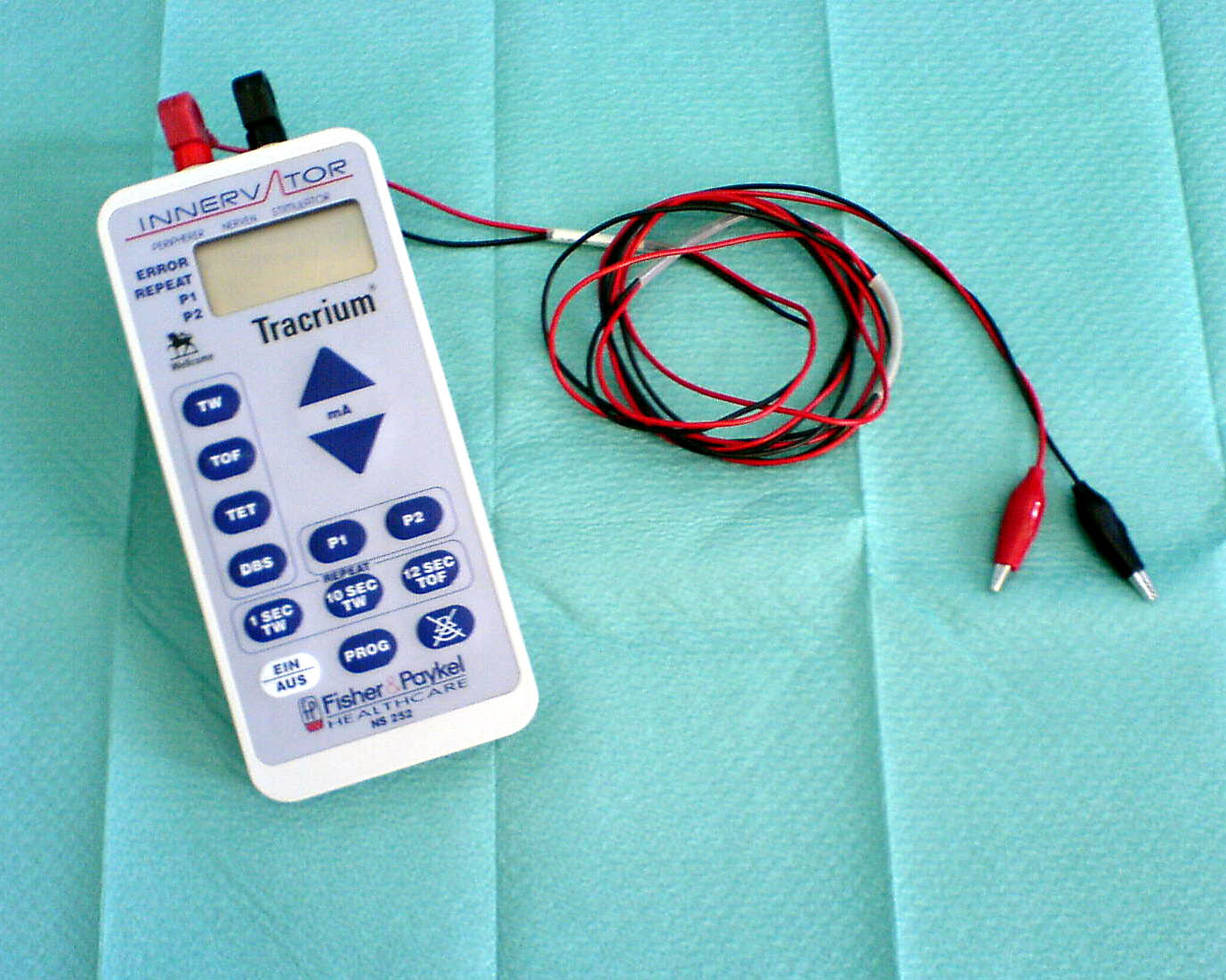
Simple subjective Peripheral Nerve stimulator

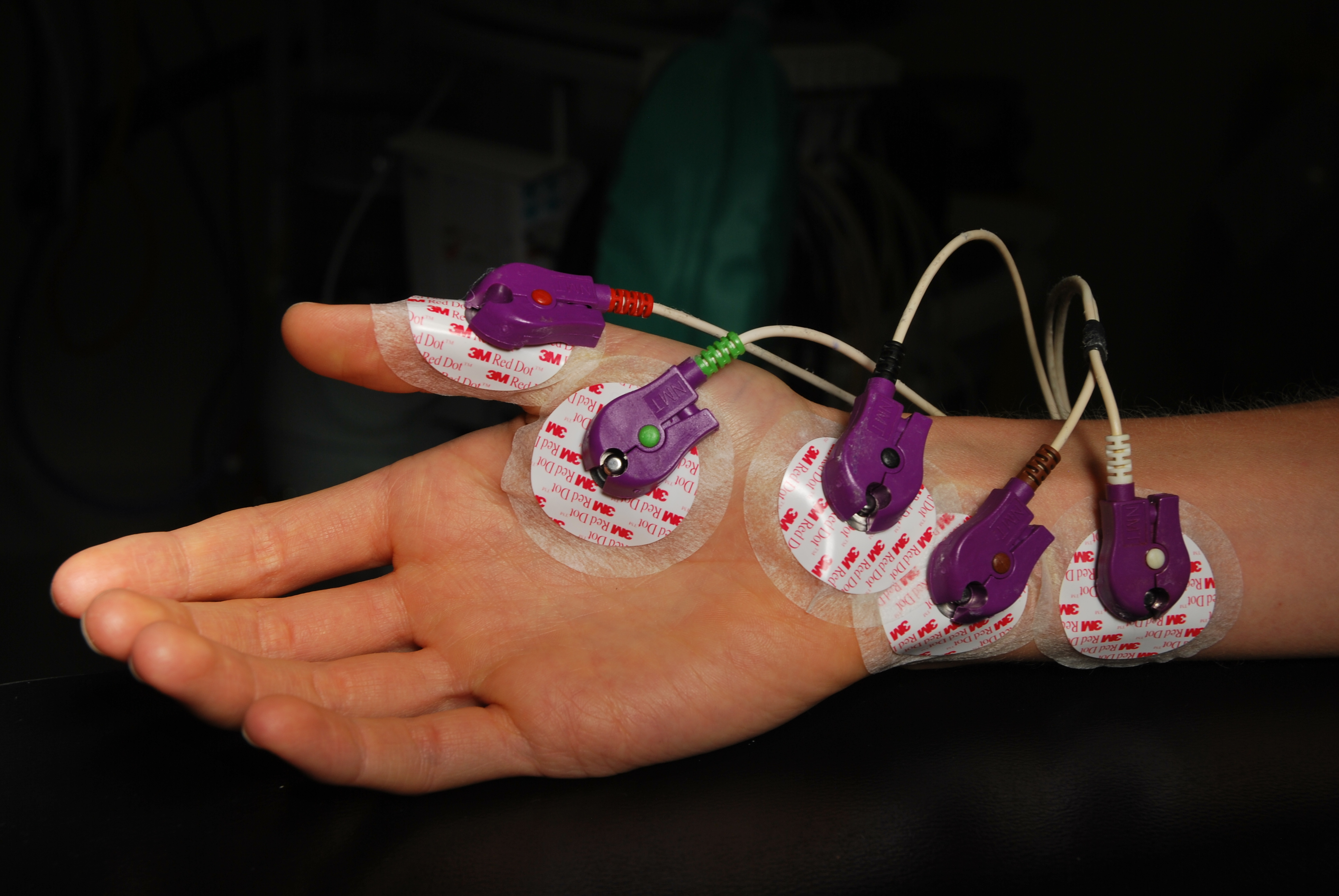
Quantitative electromyographic recording at adductor pollicis muscle and stimulation of the ulnar nerve

In anesthesia, neuromuscular blocking agents may be required to facilitate endotracheal intubation and provide optimal surgical conditions. When neuromuscular blocking agents are administered, neuromuscular function of the patient must be monitored. Neuromuscular function monitoring is a technique that involves the electrical stimulation of a motor nerve and monitoring the response of the muscle supplied by that nerve. It may be used from the induction of to recovery from neuromuscular blockade. Importantly, it is used to confirm adequacy of recovery after the administration of neuromuscular blocking agents. The response of the muscles to electrical stimulation of the nerves can be recorded subjectively (qualitative) or objectively (quantitatively). Quantitative techniques include electromyography, acceleromyography, kinemyography, phonomygraphy and mechanomyography. Neuromuscular monitoring is recommended when neuromuscular-blocking drugs have been part of the general anesthesia and the doctor wishes to avoid postoperative residual curarization (PORC) in the patient, that is, the residual paralysis of muscles stemming from these drugs.

When train of four monitoring is "used continuously, each set (train) of stimuli normally is repeated every 10th to 12th second. Each stimulus in the train causes the muscle to contract, and 'fade' in the response provides the basis for evaluation." These sets are called trains because their shape bears the resemblance of a train. In train of four monitoring, "peripheral nerve stimulation can ensure proper medication dosing and thus decrease the incidence of side effects" by "assessing the depth of neuromuscular blockade".

Before the patient is fully awake, voluntary muscle testing is not possible and indirect clinical tests, such as apparent muscle tone and pulmonary compliance, can be affected by factors other than PORC. Direct neuromuscular monitoring avoids these problems and allows the doctor to remedy PORC before it becomes a source of patient distress.

== Patterns of nerve stimulation ==
Various nerve stimulation patterns may be used in neuromuscular function monitoring and the response to these stimulation patterns is used to assess the depth of neuromuscular blockade.

Some patterns of stimulation used today include, single twitch (ST), train-of four (TOF), double burst stimulation (DBS), tetanic stimulation

and the post tetanic count.

== Monitoring the response of the muscle to nerve stimulation ==
The response of the muscle to stimulation of the nerve supplying it can be assessed by subjective (visual or tactile) techniques or quantitative (objective) devices that provide a numeric value relating to the depth of neuromuscular blockade.

=== Quantitative (objective) neuromuscular monitors ===
Quantitative neuromuscular monitors can be subdivided into monitors that measure the electrical response, the compound evoked muscle action potential, and those that monitor the contractile response to stimulation. The measurement of the electrical response to muscle stimulation is called electromyography. The mechanical response to stimulation of the muscle can be measured by mechanomyography, kinemyography and acceleromyography

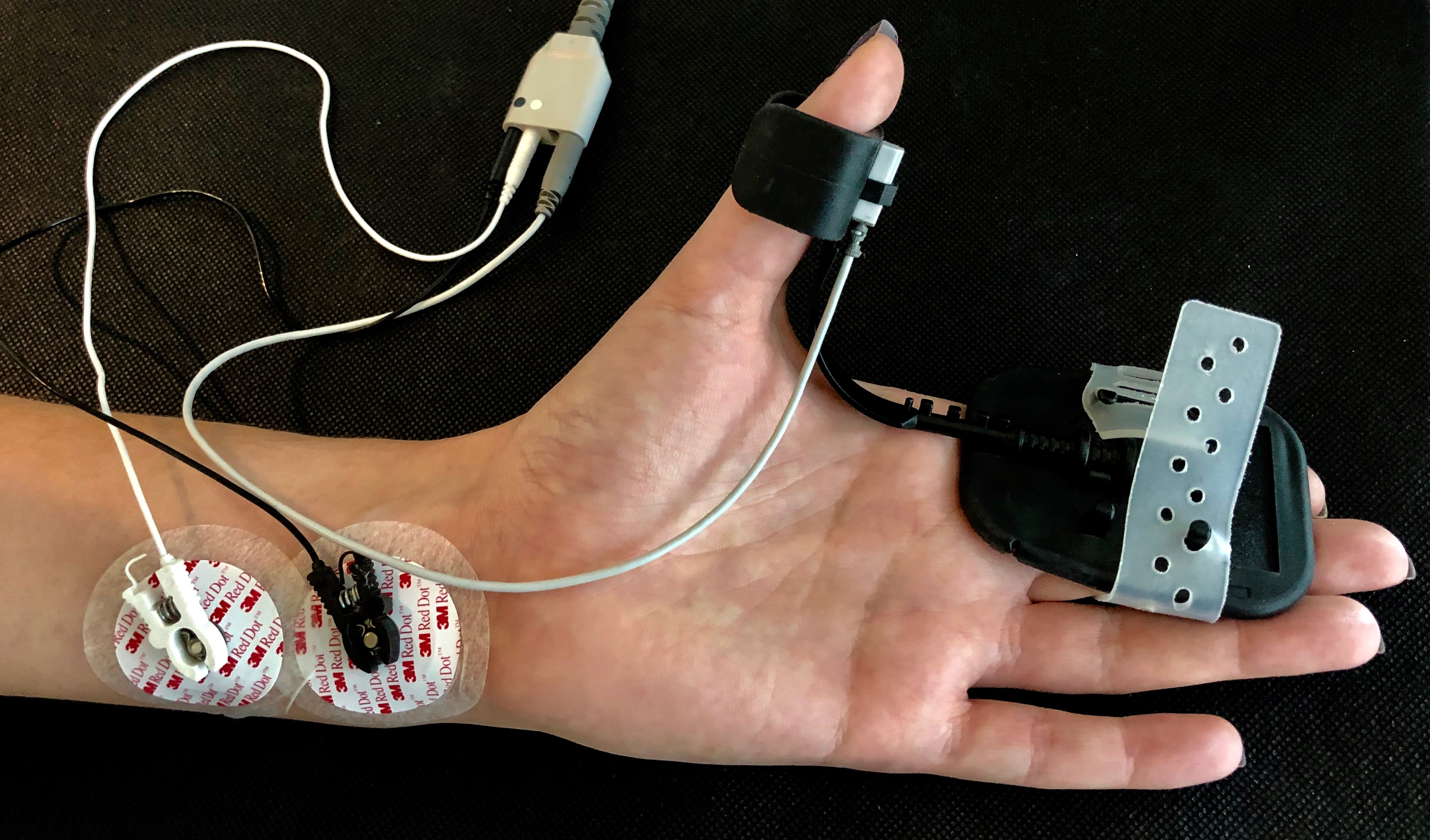
Quantitative acceleromyographic neuromuscular monitor with stimulating electrodes over the ulnar nerve and the piezoelectric crystal that measures acceleration on the thumb with hand adapter.

== Consensus Statement on Perioperative Use of Neuromuscular Monitoring ==
In 2018, recommendations were made by an international panel of experts regarding minimum standards for monitoring patients that receive neuromuscular blockade (NMB) during anaesthesia. They include:

1. "Quantitative (objective) NMB monitoring should be used whenever non-depolarising neuromuscular blocking drug is administered."
2. "Subjective or clinical tests of NMB are not predictive of adequate neuromuscular recovery and are not sensitive to detect residual weakness; their use should be abandoned in favour of quantitative (objective) monitoring."
3. "Professional organisations should develop practice standards and guidelines detailing how best to monitor and manage perioperative administration of NMBDs."
4. "Terms that describe the levels of NMB should be standardised. New proposed definitions are published in the consensus statement based on quantitative NMB monitoring criteria."

== Anaesthetic organisations with guidelines or professional standards on neuromuscular monitoring ==
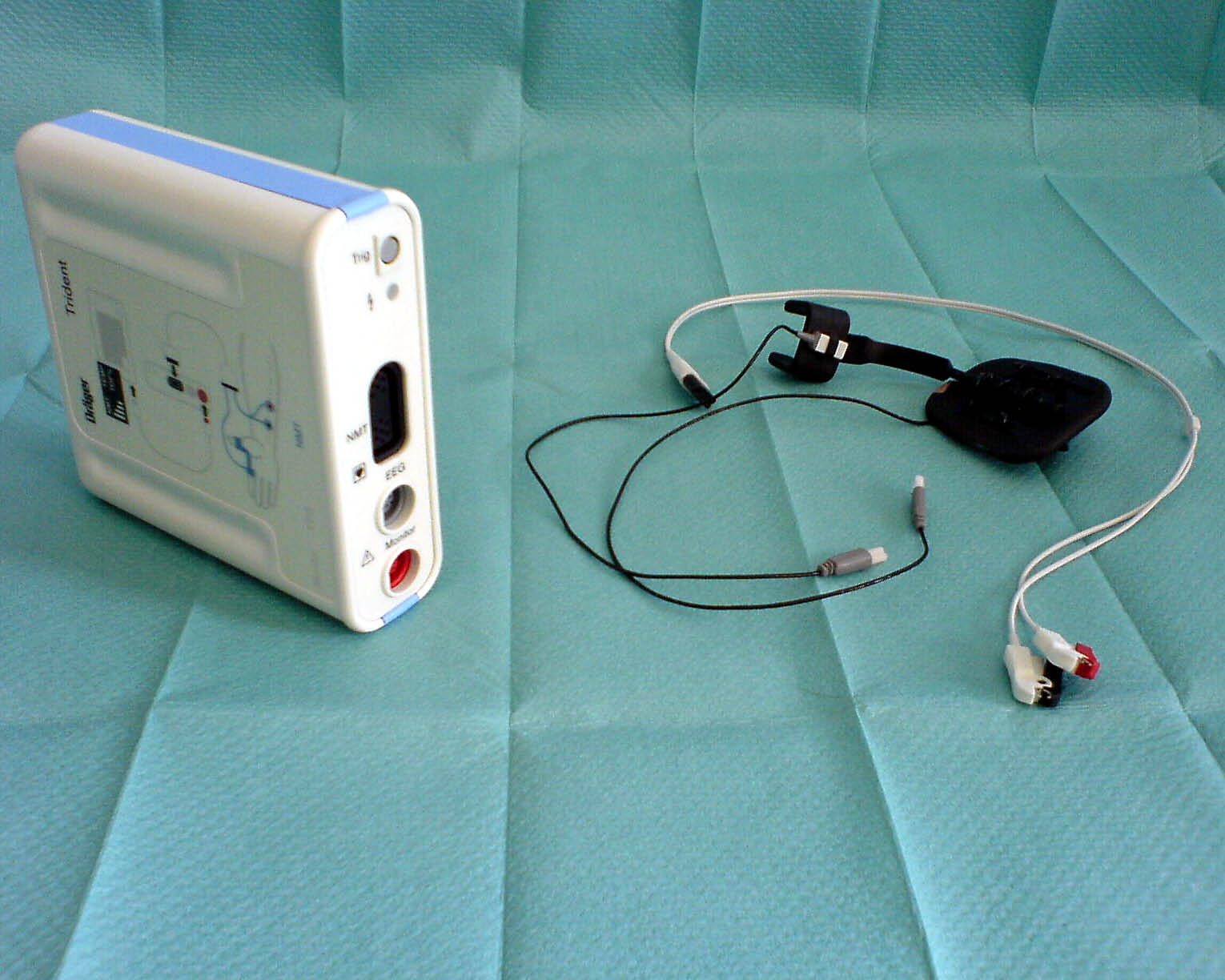
Quantitative acceleromyographic neuromuscular monitor with preload hand adapter.

The Association of Anaesthetists of Great Britain and Ireland published recommendations for standards of monitoring during anaesthesia and recovery in 2015. These included that a peripheral nerve stimulator is mandatory for all patients receiving neuromuscular blocking drugs and that they should be applied and used from induction (to confirm adequate muscle relaxation before intubation) until recovery from blockade and return of consciousness. They state that a more reliable guarantee of return of safe motor function is a train of four ratio of greater than 0.9. A quantitative neuromuscular monitor is required to accurately assess the train of four ratio.

The Australian and New Zealand College of Anaesthetists also publishes professional standards and guidelines on monitoring during anaesthesia. In respect to neuromuscular function monitoring - They state " Neuromuscular function monitoring, preferably quantitative, must be available for every patient in whom neuromuscular blockade is induced and should be used whenever the anaesthetist is considering extubation following the use of non-depolarising neuromuscular blockade."
