= Myograph =

Device used to measure the force produced by a muscle

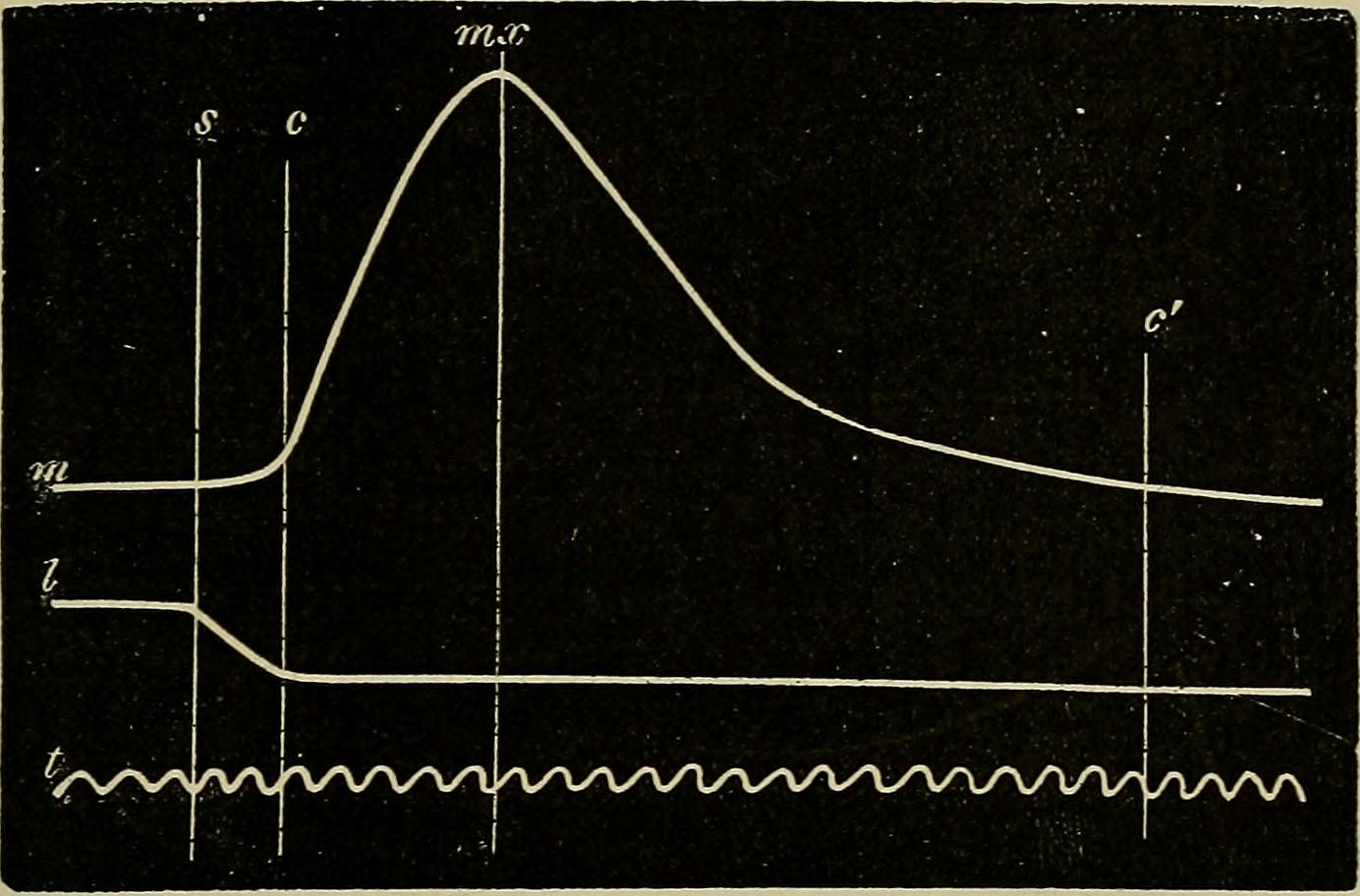
A myograph recording from a pendulum myograph after an induced contraction. The upper line (m) represents the curve traced by the end of the myograph lever in connection with a muscle after stimulation of the muscle by a single induction-shock.

A myograph is any device used to measure the force produced by a muscle when under contraction. Such a device is commonly used in myography, the study of the velocity and intensity of muscular contraction.

A myograph can take several forms: for tubular structures such as blood vessels these include the pressure myograph (where a segment of a blood vessel is cannulated at either or both ends) and the wire myograph (where the blood vessel segment is threaded onto a pair of pins or wires); for skeletal muscle other devices such as the acceleromyograph can be used.

In pharmacology, myography is used to record muscle contraction in organ bath preparations. The related technique of electromyography (EMG) is used to measure the electrical activity of the muscle instead of force. In addition, there is an optomyography (OMG) technique that uses active near-infra-red optical sensors.

== Wire Myograph ==
A wire myograph is a type of laboratory apparatus that can measure the contractility of luminal tissue segments smaller than 2 mm in diameter. It is used by pharmacologists to measure the effect of test articles on blood pressure or on airway contractility.

=== History of the wire myograph ===
Diagrams of the first ever wire myograph were revealed by Mulvany and Halpern in their 1976 paper "Contractile properties of small arterial resistance vessels in [...] rats". The group based the design of this apparatus on a technique developed by Bevan and Osher to measure arterial contractility ex vivo. Development of the wire myograph was significant because it allowed researchers to estimate the effect of novel drugs on blood pressure for the first time.

=== Structure of the wire myograph ===
The structure of the wire myograph has not changed much since its invention in 1977. Tissues are mounted in the myograph bath via two wires threaded through their lumen. These wires are attached to two opposing stainless steel jaws which secure tissue in place throughout the culture period. Multi-myograph units can contain up to four separate tissue baths, allowing four different tissue segments to be cultured simultaneously.
