= Myasthenia gravis =

Autoimmune disease resulting in skeletal muscle weakness

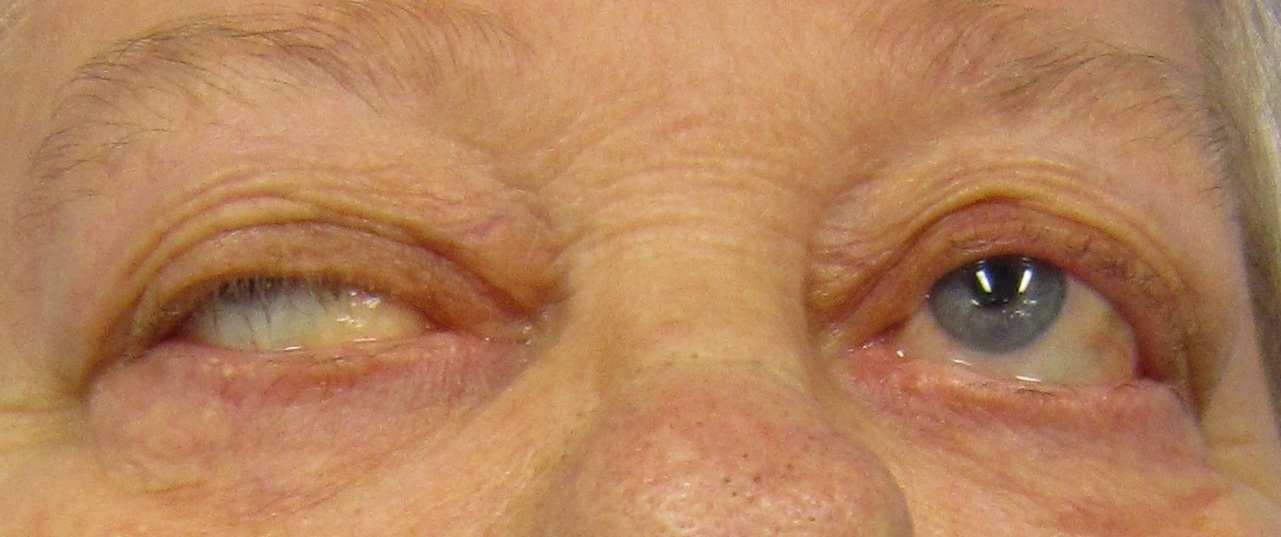
- Eye deviation and a drooping eyelid in a person with myasthenia gravis trying to open her eyes
- Specialty: Neurology
- Symptoms: Varying degrees muscle weakness, double vision, drooping eyelids, trouble talking, trouble walking
- Usual onset: Women under 40, men over 60
- Duration: Long term
- Causes: Autoimmune disease
- Diagnostic method: Blood tests for specific antibodies, edrophonium test, nerve conduction studies
- Differential diagnosis: Guillain–Barré syndrome, botulism, organophosphate poisoning, brainstem stroke, metabolic myopathies
- Treatment: Medications, surgical removal of the thymus, plasmapheresis
- Medication: Acetylcholinesterase inhibitors (neostigmine, pyridostigmine), immunosuppressants
- Frequency: 50 to 200 per million

Myasthenia gravis (MG) is a long-term neuromuscular junction disease that leads to varying degrees of skeletal muscle weakness. The most commonly affected muscles are those of the eyes, face, and swallowing. It can result in double vision, drooping eyelids, and difficulties in talking and walking. Onset can be sudden. In cases with early onset (before the age of 50), the thymus is frequently enlarged, while cases with later onset are associated with thymoma.

Myasthenia gravis is an autoimmune disease of the neuromuscular junction which results from antibodies that block or destroy nicotinic acetylcholine receptors (AChR) at the junction between the nerve and muscle. This prevents nerve impulses from triggering muscle contractions. Most cases are due to immunoglobulin G1 (IgG1) and IgG3 antibodies that attack AChR in the postsynaptic membrane, causing complement-mediated damage and muscle weakness. Rarely, an inherited genetic defect in the neuromuscular junction results in a similar condition known as congenital myasthenia. Babies of mothers with myasthenia may have symptoms during their first few months of life, known as neonatal myasthenia or more specifically transient neonatal myasthenia gravis. Diagnosis can be supported by blood tests for specific antibodies, the edrophonium test, electromyography (EMG), or a nerve conduction study.

Mild forms of myasthenia gravis may be treated with medications known as acetylcholinesterase inhibitors, such as neostigmine and pyridostigmine. But these drugs only provide symptomatic relief. Therefore almost all patients will in addition require immunosuppressants, such as prednisone, mycophenolate or azathioprine, as acetylcholinesterase inhibitors alone are insufficient. The surgical removal of the thymus may improve symptoms in certain cases. Plasmapheresis and high-dose intravenous immunoglobulin may be used when oral medications are insufficient to treat severe symptoms, including during sudden flares of the condition.

On rare occasions the respiratory muscles can become significantly weak, subsequent mechanical ventilation may then be required. Once intubated, acetylcholinesterase inhibitors may be temporarily withheld to reduce airway secretions.

Myasthenia gravis affects 50 to 200 people per million. It is newly diagnosed in 3 to 30 people per million each year. Increased awareness has made diagnosis more common. Myasthenia gravis most commonly occurs in women under the age of 40 and in men over the age of 60. It is uncommon in children.

With treatment, most have fulfilling lives and have a normal life expectancy. The word is from the Greek mys, "muscle" and asthenia "weakness", and the Latin gravis, "serious".

== Signs and symptoms ==
The initial, main symptom in myasthenia gravis is painless weakness of specific muscles, not fatigue. The muscle weakness becomes progressively worse (fatigue) during periods of physical activity and improves after periods of rest. Typically, the weakness and fatigue are worse toward the end of the day. Myasthenia gravis generally starts with ocular (eye) weakness; it might then progress to a more severe generalized form, characterized by weakness in the extremities or in muscles that govern basic life functions.

=== Eyes ===
In about two-thirds of people, the initial symptom of myasthenia gravis is related to the muscles around the eye. Eyelid drooping (ptosis may occur due to weakness of m. levator palpebrae superioris) and double vision (diplopia, due to weakness of the extraocular muscles). Eye symptoms tend to get worse when watching television, reading, or driving, particularly in bright conditions. Consequently, some affected individuals choose to wear sunglasses. The term "ocular myasthenia gravis" describes a subtype of myasthenia gravis where muscle weakness is confined to the eyes, i.e., extraocular muscles, m. levator palpebrae superioris, and m. orbicularis oculi. This subtype may evolve into generalized myasthenia gravis, usually after a few years. If an individual with ocular myasthenia gravis does not generalize for three or more years after the onset of symptoms, then generalized myasthenia gravis is unlikely to occur.

=== Eating ===
The weakness of the muscles involved in swallowing may lead to swallowing difficulty (dysphagia). Typically, this means that some food may be left in the mouth after an attempt to swallow, or food and liquids may regurgitate into the nose rather than go down the throat (velopharyngeal insufficiency). Weakness of the muscles that move the jaw (muscles of mastication) may cause difficulty chewing. In individuals with myasthenia gravis, chewing tends to become more tiring when chewing tough, fibrous foods. Difficulty in swallowing, chewing, and speaking is the first symptom in about one-sixth of individuals.

=== Speaking ===
Weakness of the muscles involved in speaking may lead to dysarthria and hypophonia. Speech may be slow and slurred, or have a nasal quality. In some cases, a singing hobby or profession must be abandoned.

=== Head and neck ===
Due to weakness of the muscles of facial expression and muscles of mastication, facial weakness may manifest as the inability to hold the mouth closed (the "hanging jaw sign") and as a snarling expression when attempting to smile. With drooping eyelids, facial weakness may make the individual appear sleepy or sad. Difficulty in holding the head upright may occur.

=== Other ===
The muscles that control breathing and limb movements can also be affected; rarely do these present as the first symptoms of myasthenia gravis, but develop over months to years. In a myasthenic crisis, a paralysis of the respiratory muscles occurs, necessitating assisted ventilation to sustain life. Crises may be triggered by various biological stressors such as infection, fever, an adverse reaction to medication, or emotional stress.

== Causes ==
=== Medications that cause or worsen myasthenia gravis ===
- Antibiotics: In the macrolide family of antibiotics, azithromycin, telithromycin (which is no longer available in the U.S. market), and erythromycin are reported to exacerbate myasthenia gravis. In the fluoroquinolone antibiotic family, ciprofloxacin, norfloxacin, ofloxacin, and moxifloxacin are reported to exacerbate myasthenia gravis. And, In the aminoglycoside family of antibiotics, gentamicin, streptomycin, and neomycin are reported to exacerbate myasthenia gravis. The aminoglycoside tobramycin has not been reported to exacerbate myasthenia gravis and may be used in people that require aminoglycoside treatment. Because of the rarity or absent reports on their exacerbation of myasthenia gravis, the following antibiotics are considered safe to use in people with myasthenia gravis: the cephalosporin class of drugs, sulfa drugs, the tetracycline group of drugs, clindamycin, polymyxin B, and nitrofurantoin.
- Immune checkpoint inhibitors: Immune checkpoint inhibitors promote certain types of autoimmune responses by blocking checkpoint pathways that inhibit these responses. They are used to treat cancers that promote their own growth and spread by stimulating checkpoint pathways. These checkpoint inhibitors include pembrolizumab, nivolumab, ipilimumab, avelumab, atezolizumab, and durvalumab. From a total 5,898 people who received these drugs, 52 developed new onset myasthenia gravis and 11 had a flare of their preexisting myasthenia gravis. The symptoms of myasthenia gravis developed within 6 days to 16 weeks (median time 4 weeks). Their medicine-induced myasthenia gravis symptoms were often severe with 29 people developing respiratory failure that required mechanical ventilation. Other studies have reported that these checkpoint inhibitors cause respiratory failure in 45% and death in 25–40% of people with myasthenia gravis.
- Statins: Statins are drugs that lower blood cholesterol levels in order to reduce the risk of developing a cardiovascular disease due to atherosclerosis. In a 2019 review of 169 people who were reported to develop myasthenia gravis or had worsened myasthenia gravis symptoms while taking a statin, 138 had developed generalized myasthenia gravis, 13 had developed ocular myasthenia gravis, and 18 had worsening of their myasthenia gravis. Following discontinuance of the statin and treatment of their myasthenia gravis, 63 people fully recovered, 27 people were recovering, 19 people had not yet recovered, 5 people recovered but had ongoing symptoms, 1 individual had died, and there was no follow-up data for 54 people. Among these cases, 56% were considered to be serious. A 2024 study evaluated 593 people who had myasthenia gravis and 790,399 people who did not have myasthenia gravis after being treated with a statin. The statin-treatment caused small but statistically significant increases in numbers of exacerbations of myasthenia gravis as well as new onsets of myasthenia gravis in people without the disorder. The development of myasthenia gravis in people without myasthenia gravis appeared to be more likely in people over 60 years of age. Six non-statin cholesterol-lowering drugs, nicotinic acid, cholestyramine, colestipol, colesevelam, alirocumab, and evolocumab, have been used in people without causing or worsening myasthenia gravis.
- Beta blockers: Beta blockers (i.e., β-blockers) are drugs that block the binding of two stress hormones, epinephrine and norepinephrine, to their target beta receptors. They are used to decrease the heart rate, reduce the force of heart contractions, and relax blood vessels in order to lower blood pressure and reduce the workload on the heart. In one study the odds of an myasthenia gravis exacerbation after taking a beta blocker was increased 2.7-fold compared with people with myasthenia gravis not taking a beta blocker. These exacerbations generally did not occur immediately after their usage and therefore may have reflected other comorbidities in people with myasthenia gravis being treated with beta blockers. In a study of 20 people with myasthenia gravis treated with a beta blocker, 3 who received oral metoprolol, 9 who received intravenous metoprolol, 1 who received oral labetalol, and 9 who received intravenous labetalol, only one (i.e., 5%) of the 20 participants (who received intravenous labetalol) reacted with an exacerbation of myasthenia gravis symptoms.
- Ia antiarrhythmic agents: A type Ia antiarrhythmic agent (see Vaughan Williams classification), i.e., procainamide, which is used to treat cardiac arrhythmias, has caused respiratory failure in people with myasthenia gravis who, prior to being treated with it, did not have respiratory symptoms. Furthermore, this drug has caused MG-like symptoms in people who have kidney failure but do not have myasthenia gravis. And, procainamide worsened muscle dysfunction in a rat model of human myasthenia gravis.
- Depolarizing neuromuscular blockers: Depolarizing neuromuscular blockers suppress the neurons' signaling at neuromuscular junctions thereby reducing the affected skeletal muscles contractibility. These blockers are used as muscle relaxants in people undergoing surgery. Succinylcholine is the only depolarizing neuromuscular blocker available in the US market. Succinylcholine's ability to induce or worsen myasthenia gravis is unclear. It has been suggested to cause life-threatening side effects such as rhabdomyolysis, myotonia, and hyperkalemia in people with muscle disease although the role of succinylcholine in causing these side effects also remains unclear.
- Inhalation anesthetics: Inhalation anesthetics are general anesthetics that are delivered by inhalation generally for people undergoing surgery. People with myasthenia gravis undergoing surgery with inhaled anesthetics (i.e., halothane, isoflurane, enflurane, and sevoflurane) may develop neuromuscular blockage and have an increased incidence of developing a life-threatening myasthenia crisis which must be treated by prolonged mechanical ventilation. In a study of 795 people with myasthenia gravis undergoing surgical removal of their thymus under general anesthesia, sugammadex, a neuromuscular-blocking drug (i.e., a drug that reverses neuromuscular blockade) significantly reduced the development of this crisis.
- Glucocorticoids: Glucocorticoids are anti-inflammatory agents that in initial studies were used at high dosages and found to worsen myasthenia gravis in 25-75% of cases. However, further studies found that glucocorticoids do have favorable effects on myasthenia gravis when taken long term. Two glucocorticoids, oral prednisone and prednisolone, are the first-line immunosuppressive treatment for myasthenia gravis. A review published in 2020 on 27 earlier publications found that myasthenia gravis was worsened by glucocorticoids in 33.3% of patients. These myasthenia gravis exacerbations seemed significantly greater for cortisone, intermediate for prednisone, and lowest for methylprednisolone. High dosages or alternate day dosages of prednisone were associated with exacerbation more frequently than low-dose treatments. Most of these exacerbations were mild to moderately severe and developed more often in patients who were older in age or had generalized myasthenia gravis, myasthenia gravis with bulbar symptoms, severe symptoms, a thymoma, or a history of thymectomy to remove a thymoma. These studies, however, were mostly of low quality. Prospective studies comparing the effects of the different corticosteroids to define the rate and severity of the myasthenia exacerbations are needed.
- Calcium channel blockers: Calcium channel blockers (e.g., felodipine, nifedipine, and verapamil) are drugs that lower blood pressure in people with hypertension. Felodipine and nifedipine are reported to worsen myasthenia gravis and nifedipine and verapamil are reported to cause respiratory failure in people with severe generalized myasthenia gravis.
- Penicillamine: Penicillamine is a chelation therapy drug used to treat various diseases (e.g., Wilson's disease). About 1-2% of individuals treated long term with penicillamine develop myasthenia gravis and/or develop low concentrations of antibodies to AChR. Their myasthenia gravis is often mild and predominantly ocular myasthenia gravis, becomes evident usually 6–7 months (range one month to 8 years) after starting the drug, and goes into complete remission in 70% of the cases within 6–10 months after discontinuing the drug.
- Botulinum toxin A: Botulinum toxin A (sold under the brand name Botox, Jeuveau, and Xeomin) blocks transmission at neuromuscular junctions to paralyze the muscles into which it is injected. Local botulinum toxin A injections for cosmetic purposes have on occasion caused weaknesses in distant muscles, symptoms resembling ocular or generalized myasthenia gravis in individuals with subclinical myasthenia gravis, and exacerbations of previously controlled myasthenia gravis. Botulinum toxin A has also been used to treat spasmodic torticollis (i.e., involuntarily neck turning), blepharospasm (involuntary contraction of the eye lids), and other uncontrolled facial muscle spasms in people with myasthenia gravis without side effects or with only short-lived dysphagia or diplopia.
- Magnesium: Magnesium is a chemical element that blocks skeletal muscle contraction by inhibiting the release or acetylcholine at the neuromuscular junction and also by lowering the sensitivity of these muscles to acetylcholine. Respiratory failure has occurred after systemic use of magnesium (mainly in the form of intravenous magnesium sulfate injections) for pre-eclampsia and after magnesium replacement during the course of a hospitalization in people with underlying myasthenia gravis.
- Local anesthetics: Local anesthetics cause absence of pain and all other sensations in a specific body part without loss of consciousness. There are two broad classes of these anesthetics: esters (i.e., procaine, cocaine, tetracaine benzocaine, and chloroprocaine) and amides (i.e. , lidocaine, bupivacaine, etidocaine, levobupivacaine, mepivacaine, prilocaine, and ropivacaine). Ester local anesthetics are metabolized by pseudocholinesterases which in people with myasthenia gravis taking anticholinesterase drugs may lead to excessive levels of these ester anesthetics. Amide local anesthetics are not metabolized by psuedocholineesterases. Based on these considerations, amide local anesthetics are strongly preferred over ester local anesthetics in people with myasthenia gravis.
- Other Drugs: Rare cases of myasthenia gravis exacerbations have been reported in people treated with: 1) penicillins, i.e., ampicillin and amoxicillin; 2) anti-cancer medications, i.e., lorlatinib, nilotinib, imatinib (these three drugs are tyrosine kinase inhibitors that may also cause myasthenia gravis), dabrafenib, and trametinib; 3) antipsychotic drugs, i.e., chlorpromazine, pimozide, thioridazine, clozapine, olanzapine, haloperidol, quetiapine, and risperidone; 4) IFN-α (may also cause myasthenia gravis); and 5) the chemical element, lithium. These agents can be used in people with myasthenia gravis because reports on their exacerbation (or induction) of myasthenia gravis are rare.

== Pathophysiology ==
Myasthenia gravis is an autoimmune synaptopathy. The disorder occurs when the immune system malfunctions and generates antibodies that attack the body's tissues. The antibodies in MG attack a normal human protein, the nicotinic acetylcholine receptor, or a related protein called MuSK, a muscle-specific kinase. Other, less frequent antibodies are found against LRP4, agrin, and titin proteins.

Human leukocyte antigen haplotypes are associated with increased susceptibility to myasthenia gravis and other autoimmune disorders. Relatives of people with myasthenia gravis have a higher percentage of other immune disorders.

The thymus gland cells form part of the body's immune system. In those with myasthenia gravis, the thymus gland is large and abnormal. It sometimes contains clusters of immune cells that indicate lymphoid hyperplasia, and the thymus gland may give wrong instructions to immune cells.

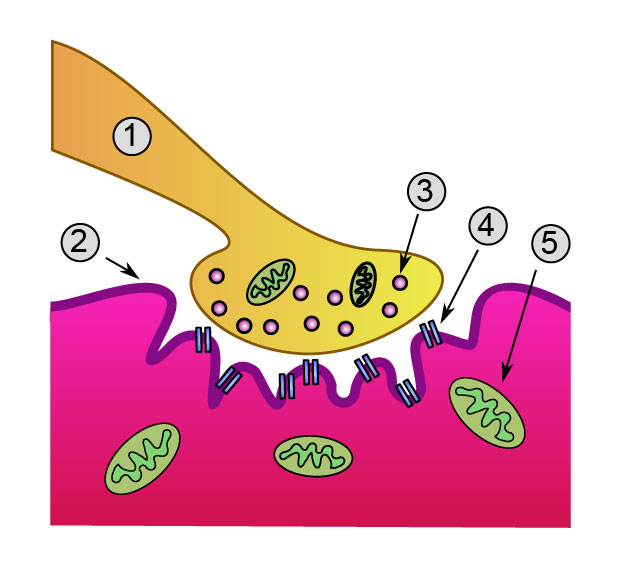
Neuromuscular junction: 1. Axon 2. Muscle cell membrane 3. Synaptic vesicle 4. Nicotinic acetylcholine receptor 5. Mitochondrion

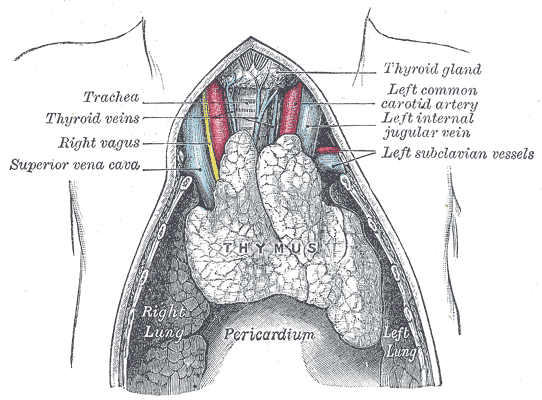
A juvenile thymus shrinks with age.

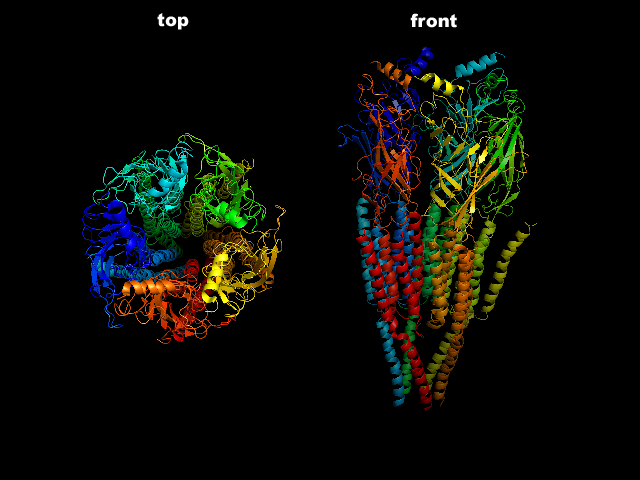
The nicotinic acetylcholine receptor

=== In pregnancy ===
For women who are pregnant and already have MG, in a third of cases, they have been known to experience an exacerbation of their symptoms, and in those cases, it usually occurs in the first trimester of pregnancy. Signs and symptoms in pregnant mothers tend to improve during the second and third trimesters. Complete remission can occur in some mothers. Immunosuppressive therapy should be maintained throughout pregnancy, as this reduces the chance of neonatal muscle weakness, and controls the mother's myasthenia.

About 10–20% of infants with mothers affected by the condition are born with transient neonatal myasthenia gravis (TNMG), which generally produces feeding and respiratory difficulties that develop about 12 hours to several days after birth. A child with TNMG typically responds very well to acetylcholinesterase inhibitors, and the condition generally resolves over a period of three weeks, as the antibodies diminish, and generally does not result in any complications. However, a small percentage of fetuses and newborns with TNMG, particularly those who have antibodies directed against the fetal form of the AChR (their disorder is a subtype of TNMG termed the "acetylcholine receptor inactivation syndrome") have a more severe form of TNMG which includes weakness in skeletal muscles regulating breathing, respiratory failure, and various deformities such as arthrogryposis multiplex congenita. In some of these cases, the mother remains asymptomatic.

== Diagnosis ==
Myasthenia gravis can be difficult to diagnose, as the symptoms can be subtle and hard to distinguish from both normal variants and other neurological disorders.

Three types of myasthenic symptoms in children can be distinguished:

1. Transient neonatal myasthenia gravis occurs in 10 to 15% of babies born to mothers afflicted with the disorder, and disappears after a few weeks.
2. Congenital myasthenia, the rarest form, occurs when genes are present from both parents.
3. Juvenile myasthenia gravis is most common in females.

Congenital myasthenias cause muscle weakness and fatigability similar to those of MG. The signs of congenital myasthenia usually are present in the first years of childhood, although they may not be recognized until adulthood.

=== Subgroup classification ===
Myasthenia Gravis Foundation of America Clinical Classification
Class	Description
I	Any eye muscle weakness, possible ptosis, no other evidence of muscle weakness elsewhere
II	Eye muscle weakness of any severity, mild weakness of other muscles
IIa	Predominantly limb or axial muscles
IIb	Predominantly bulbar and/or respiratory muscles
III	Eye muscle weakness of any severity, moderate weakness of other muscles
IIIa	Predominantly limb or axial muscles
IIIb	Predominantly bulbar and/or respiratory muscles
IV	Eye muscle weakness of any severity, severe weakness of other muscles
IVa	Predominantly limb or axial muscles
IVb	Predominantly bulbar and/or respiratory muscles
V	Intubation needed to maintain airway

When diagnosed with myasthenia gravis, an individual can be stratified into distinct subgroups based on the clinical features and serological status, e.g., affected muscle group, age of onset, thymic abnormalities, and profile of serum autoantibodies.

Based on the affected muscle group, people with myasthenia gravis can be sub-grouped into ocular myasthenia gravis or generalized myasthenia gravis. Ocular myasthenia gravis is characterized by exclusively ocular symptoms, droopy eyelids, or double vision. Generalized myasthenia gravis has muscle weakness with a variable combination of the bulbar, axial, or limb and respiratory muscles.

People with myasthenia gravis can also be sub-grouped by the age of onset: juvenile-onset myasthenia gravis (onset age ≤ 18 years of age), early-onset MG (EOMG; 19–50 years of age), late-onset MG (LOMG; onset > 50 years of age), and very late-onset (VLOMG; onset age ≥ 65 years of age).

The subgroup of the autoantibody profile includes AChR seropositive, MuSK seropositive, LRP4 seropositive, and agrin seropositive.

=== Physical examination ===
During a physical examination to check for MG, a doctor might ask the person to perform repetitive movements. For instance, the doctor may ask one to look at a fixed point for 30 seconds and to relax the muscles of the forehead, because a person with MG and ptosis of the eyes might be involuntarily using the forehead muscles to compensate for the weakness in the eyelids. The clinical examiner might also try to elicit the "curtain sign" in a person by holding one of the person's eyes open, which in the case of MG will lead the other eye to close.

=== Train of four ratio test ===
The train of four ratio (i.e., ToFr) is a neuromuscular test for monitoring neuromuscular function (see monitoring neuromuscular blockade). In this test, a peripheral nerve (most commonly the ulnar nerve) is stimulated by an electrical impulse 4 times (i.e., T1, T2, T3, T4) and the strength of contraction is measured in a muscle(s) (i.e., the abductor pollicis longus and brevis muscles for the ulnar nerve). The ratio of the amplitude of muscle contraction in response to the fourth impulse (T4) divided by the amplitude of muscle contraction in response to the first impulse is calculated. The ratio of these two contractions should be 1.0. Values less than this are regarded as abnormal. ToFr is used to determine when the effects of an administered neuromuscular-blocking drug have worn off (see postoperative residual curarization) or as the most objective, accurate, and sensitive test for determining the presence and severity of myasthenia gravis: myasthenia gravis is considered to afflict the tested muscle if its ToFr ratio (i.e., T4/T1) is less than 0.9.

=== Blood tests ===
If the diagnosis is suspected, serology can be performed:

- One test is for antibodies against the acetylcholine receptor; the test has a reasonable sensitivity of 80–96%, but in ocular myasthenia, the sensitivity falls to 50%.
- A proportion of the people without antibodies against the acetylcholine receptor have antibodies against the MuSK protein.
- Less than 1% of patients with myasthenia gravis have antibodies against low-density lipoprotein receptor-related protein 4 (i.e., LRP4).
- In suspicious situations, testing can be performed for the similar symptomatic Lambert-Eaton syndrome.

=== Electrodiagnostics ===
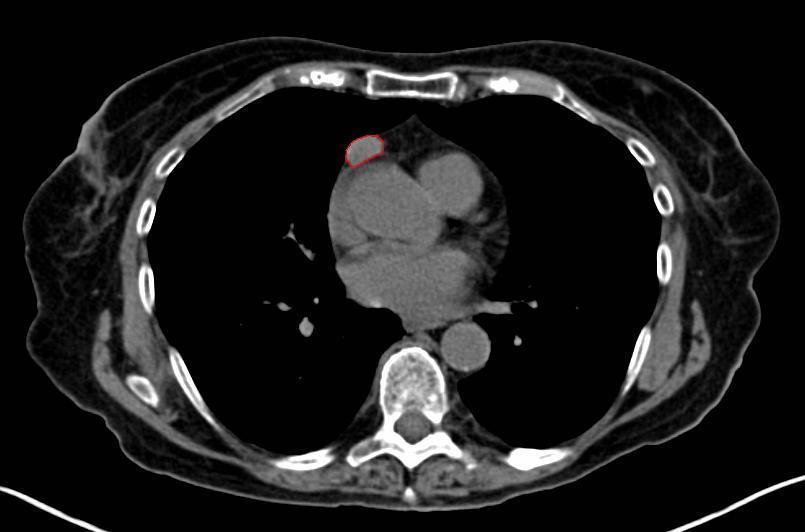
A chest CT-scan showing a thymoma (red circle)

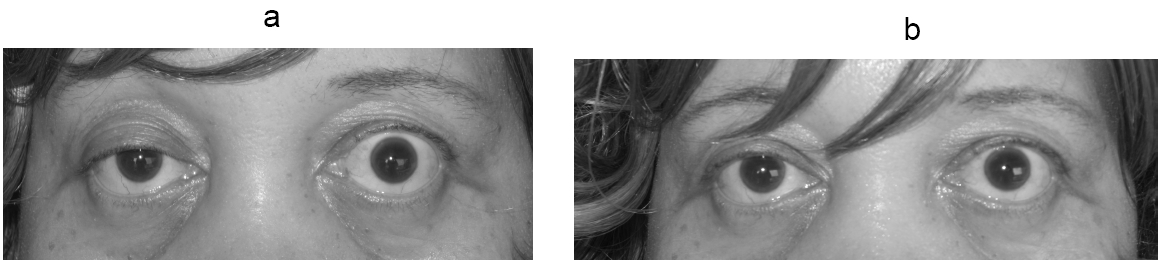
Photograph of a person showing right partial ptosis (left picture), the left lid shows compensatory pseudo lid retraction because of equal innervation of the m. levator palpabrae superioris (Hering's law of equal innervation): Right picture: after an edrophonium test, note the improvement in ptosis.

Muscle fibers of people with MG are easily fatigued, which the repetitive nerve stimulation test can help diagnose. In single-fiber electromyography, which is considered to be the most sensitive (although not the most specific) test for MG, a thin needle electrode is inserted into different areas of a particular muscle to record the action potentials from several samplings of different individual muscle fibers. Two muscle fibers belonging to the same motor unit are identified, and the temporal variability in their firing patterns is measured. Frequency and proportion of particular abnormal action potential patterns, called "jitter" and "blocking", are diagnostic.

Jitter refers to the abnormal variation in the time interval between action potentials of adjacent muscle fibers in the same motor unit. Blocking refers to the failure of nerve impulses to elicit action potentials in adjacent muscle fibers of the same motor unit.

=== Ice test ===
Applying ice for 2–5 minutes to the muscles reportedly has a sensitivity and specificity of 76.9% and 98.3%, respectively, for the identification of MG. Acetylcholinesterase is thought to be inhibited at the lower temperature, which is the basis for this diagnostic test. This generally is performed on the eyelids when ptosis is present and is deemed positive if a ≥2-mm rise in the eyelid occurs after the ice is removed.

=== Edrophonium test ===
This test requires the intravenous administration of edrophonium chloride or neostigmine, drugs that block the breakdown of acetylcholine by cholinesterase (acetylcholinesterase inhibitors). This test is no longer typically performed, as its use can lead to life-threatening bradycardia (slow heart rate) which requires immediate emergency attention. Production of edrophonium was discontinued in 2008.

=== Imaging ===
A chest X-ray may identify widening of the mediastinum suggestive of thymoma, but computed tomography or magnetic resonance imaging (MRI) are more sensitive ways to identify thymomas and are generally done for this reason. MRI of the cranium and orbits may also be performed to exclude compressive and inflammatory lesions of the cranial nerves and ocular muscles.

=== Pulmonary function test ===
The forced vital capacity may be monitored at intervals to detect increasing muscular weakness. Acutely, negative inspiratory force may be used to determine adequacy of ventilation; it is performed on those individuals with MG.

=== Differential diagnoses ===
The muscle weakness that worsens with activity (abnormal muscle fatigue) in myasthenia gravis is a symptom shared by other neuromuscular diseases. Most of the metabolic myopathies, such as McArdle disease (GSD-V), have abnormal muscle fatigue rather than fixed muscle weakness. Also, like myasthenia gravis, exercise intolerance in McArdle disease improves with regular physical activity (performed safely using activity adaptations such as getting into second wind, the "30 for 80 rule," and "six second rule"). A small minority of people with McArdle disease also have the comorbidity of ptosis (drooping upper eyelid). Late-onset GSD-II (Pompe disease) and GSD-XV also have muscle weakness or fatigue with comorbidities of ptosis and ophthalmoplegia; as do many of the mitochondrial myopathies.

Other diseases that involve abnormal muscle fatigue (which may be described as exercise-induced muscle weakness, reversible muscle weakness, or muscle weakness that improves with rest) include: endocrine myopathies (such as Hoffman syndrome), Tubular aggregate myopathy (TAM), ischemia (such as intermittent claudication, popliteal artery entrapment syndrome, and chronic venous insufficiency), and poor diet or malabsorption diseases that lead to vitamin D deficiency (osteomalic myopathy). Although limb-girdle muscular dystrophies (LGMDs) involve fixed muscle weakness, LGMDR8 also involves muscle fatigue; as do some limb-girdle muscular dystrophy-dystroglycanopathies such as MDDGC3 (a.k.a. LGMDR15 and LGMD2O). Myofibrillar myopathy 10, dimethylglycine dehydrogenase deficiency, erythrocyte lactate transporter defect, and myopathy with myalgia, increased serum creatine kinase, with or without episodic rhabdomyolysis (MMCKR) also include muscle fatigue.

X-linked episodic muscle weakness (EMWX) includes general muscle weakness, ptosis, and fluctuations in strength. In some individuals, fatiguability was demonstrable, the phenotype having features comparable to congenital myasthenic syndromes and channelopathies.

Signs and symptoms of myasthenia presenting from infancy or childhood may be one of the congenital myasthenic syndromes, which can be inherited in either an autosomal dominant or recessive manner. There are currently over two dozen types of congenital myasthenic syndromes.

Limb–girdle myasthenia gravis is a distinct condition from myasthenia gravis. It is an adult-onset, autoimmune condition affecting the neuromuscular junction. However, it lacks eye abnormalities and is associated with autoimmune conditions such as systemic lupus erythematosus, Hashimoto's thyroiditis, and thymoma.

Lambert–Eaton myasthenic syndrome (LEMS) is an autoimmune condition that attacks the neuromuscular junction, either as a paraneoplastic syndrome (typically older people) or associated with a non-cancerous primary autoimmune condition (typically younger people). It usually involves lower limb weakness and exercise-induced fatiguability, although the upper limbs and eyes may also be involved. Lambert's sign is the unusual improvement of grip strength that follows after squeezing the hand at maximum intensity for 2–3 seconds.

== Management ==
Treatment is by medication and/or surgery. Medication consists mainly of acetylcholinesterase inhibitors to directly improve muscle function and immunosuppressant drugs to reduce the autoimmune process. Thymectomy is a surgical method to treat MG especially in younger patients and those with a thymoma.

=== Medication ===
Neostigmine, chemical structure

Azathioprine, chemical structure

About 10% of people with generalized MG are considered treatment-refractory. Autologous hematopoietic stem cell transplantation (HSCT) is sometimes used in severe, treatment-refractory MG. Available data provide preliminary evidence that HSCT can be an effective therapeutic option in carefully selected cases.

Efgartigimod alfa (Vyvgart) was approved for medical use in the United States in December 2021.

Efgartigimod alfa/hyaluronidase (Vyvgart Hytrulo) was approved for medical use in the United States in June 2023.

Rozanolixizumab (Rystiggo) was approved for medical use in the United States in June 2023.

==== Acetylcholinesterase inhibitors ====
Acetylcholinesterase inhibitors can provide symptomatic benefit and may not fully remove a person's weakness from MG. While they might not fully remove all symptoms of MG, they still may allow a person the ability to perform normal daily activities. Usually, acetylcholinesterase inhibitors are started at a low dose and increased until the desired result is achieved. If taken 30 minutes before a meal, symptoms will be mild during eating, which is helpful for those who have difficulty swallowing due to their illness. Another medication used for MG, atropine, can reduce the muscarinic side effects of acetylcholinesterase inhibitors. Pyridostigmine is a relatively long-acting drug (when compared to other cholinergic agonists), with a half-life around four hours with relatively few side effects. Generally, it is discontinued in those who are being mechanically ventilated, as it is known to increase the amount of salivary secretions. A few high-quality studies have directly compared cholinesterase inhibitors with other treatments (or placebo); their practical benefit may be so significant that conducting studies in which they would be withheld from some people would be difficult.

==== Immune suppressants ====
The steroid prednisone might also be used to achieve a better result, but it can lead to the worsening of symptoms and takes weeks to achieve its maximal effectiveness. Research suggests that up to 15% of people with myasthenia gravis do not positively respond to immune suppressants. Due to the myriad symptoms that steroid treatments can cause, it is not the preferred method of treatment. Other immune suppressing medications may also be used including rituximab,azathioprine and especially mycophenolate.

Nipocalimab (Imaavy) was approved for medical use in the United States in April 2025.

=== Plasmapheresis and IVIG ===
If the myasthenia is serious (myasthenic crisis), plasmapheresis can be used to remove the putative antibodies from the circulation. Also, intravenous immunoglobulins (IVIGs) can be used to bind the circulating antibodies. Both of these treatments have relatively short-lived benefits, typically measured in weeks, and often are associated with high costs, which make them prohibitive; they are generally reserved for when MG requires hospitalization.

=== Surgery ===
As thymomas are seen in 10% of all people with the MG, they are often given a chest X-ray and CT scan to evaluate their need for surgical removal of their thymus glands and any cancerous tissue that may be present. Even if surgery is performed to remove a thymoma, it generally does not lead to the remission of MG. Surgery in the case of MG involves the removal of the thymus, although in 2013, no clear benefit was indicated except in the presence of a thymoma. A 2016 randomized, controlled trial, however, found some benefits.

=== Physical measures ===
People with MG should be educated regarding the fluctuating nature of their symptoms, including weakness and exercise-induced fatigue. Exercise participation should be encouraged with frequent rest. In people with generalized MG, some evidence indicates a partial home program including training in diaphragmatic breathing, pursed-lip breathing, and interval-based muscle therapy may improve respiratory muscle strength, chest wall mobility, respiratory pattern, and respiratory endurance.

=== Medical imaging ===
In people with myasthenia gravis, older forms of iodinated contrast used for medical imaging have caused an increased risk of exacerbation of the disease, but modern forms have no immediate increased risk.

== Prognosis ==
The prognosis of people with MG is generally good, as is quality of life, when given very good treatment. Monitoring of a person with MG is very important, as at least 20% of people diagnosed with it will experience a myasthenic crisis within two years of their diagnosis, requiring rapid medical intervention. Generally, the most disabling period of MG might be years after the initial diagnosis. Assistive devices may be needed to assist with mobility. In the early 1900s, 70% of detected cases died from lung problems; now, that number is estimated to be around 3–5%, an improvement attributed to increased awareness and medications to manage symptoms.

== Epidemiology ==
MG occurs in all ethnic groups and both sexes. It most commonly affects women under 40 and people from 50 to 70 years old of either sex, but it has been known to occur at any age. Younger people rarely have thymoma. Prevalence in the United States is estimated at between 0.5 and 20.4 cases per 100,000, with an estimated 60,000 Americans affected. In the United Kingdom, an estimated 15 cases of MG occur per 100,000 people. The mortality rate of MG is around 5-9%.

== History ==
The first to write about MG were Thomas Willis, Samuel Wilks, Erb, and Goldflam. The term "myasthenia gravis pseudo-paralytica" was proposed in 1895 by Jolly, a German physician. Mary Walker treated a person with MG with physostigmine in 1934. Simpson and Nastuck detailed the autoimmune nature of the condition. In 1973, Patrick and Lindstrom used rabbits to show that immunization with purified muscle-like acetylcholine receptors caused the development of MG-like symptoms.

== Research ==
Immunomodulating substances, such as drugs that prevent acetylcholine receptor modulation by the immune system, are currently being researched. Some research recently has been on anti-c5 inhibitors for treatment research as they are safe and used in the treatment of other diseases. Ephedrine seems to benefit some people more than other medications, but it has not been properly studied as of 2014. In the laboratory, MG is mostly studied in model organisms, such as rodents. In addition, in 2015, scientists developed an in vitro functional, all-human, neuromuscular junction assay from human embryonic stem cells and somatic-muscle stem cells. After the addition of pathogenic antibodies against the acetylcholine receptor and activation of the complement system, the neuromuscular co-culture shows symptoms such as weaker muscle contractions. Recent years, scientists have been working on finding the reliable biomarkers for MG to monitor the disease development and assess the severity.
