= Tensilon test =

Pharmacological test used to diagnose myasthenia gravis

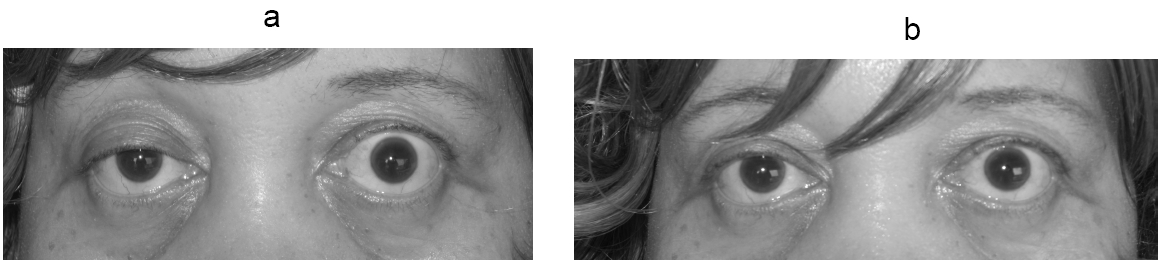
- Reversal of ptosis following tensilon test in a myasthenia gravis
- Synonyms: Edrophonium test
- Purpose: Diagnose neural diseases
- MedlinePlus: 003930

A tensilon test, also called an edrophonium test, is a pharmacological test used for the diagnosis of certain neural diseases, especially myasthenia gravis. It is also used to distinguish a myasthenic crisis from a cholinergic crisis in individuals undergoing treatment for myasthenia gravis. The test has fallen out of use due to suboptimal sensitivity and specificity as well as associated adverse risks. Edrophonium is no longer available in the United States and many other countries as of 2018.

== Procedure ==
A 10 mg edrophonium chloride syringe and a 2 mg atropine syringe are prepared. Atropine is prepared for immediate use in case cholinergic crisis occurs. After a neurologic examination and recording of vital signs, 2 mg edrophonium is injected intravenously. After waiting 30 seconds and ensuring that no adverse reactions have occurred, the remaining 8 mg of edrophonium is also injected. The patient is then asked to perform repetitive tasks, such as lifting an object or opening and closing the eyelids. Under the influence of edrophonium, patients with myasthenia gravis are able to complete these tasks more easily and with more strength than before the injection was administered. The effects of edrophonium last around ten minutes. The edrophonium allows accumulation of acetylcholine (ACh) in the neuromuscular junctions and makes more ACh available to the muscle receptors, thereby increasing muscle strength in myasthenia gravis. In newborns, a 0.15 mg/kg dose of neostigmine administered subcutaneously produces a response within ten minutes. In infants, the drug is administered intravenously at a dose of 0.2 mg/kg. Improvement of diplopia is often used as an evaluation item because in this case, placebo effect can be excluded.

== Precautions ==
The tensilon test is administered by a trained clinician, usually a neurologist. A thorough history taking and physical assessment is done before the administration of test, to rule out hypersensitivity, pregnancy, lactation, and intestinal obstruction. Care is taken while performing the test in individuals over 50, and those under corticosteroids or pro-cholinergic drugs. Vital signs are monitored before, during, and after the test. The test should only be performed in a medical center equipped to manage cholinergic crisis. Following the test, the patient is observed for cholinergic responses such as increased salivation, lacrimation, nausea, and vomiting.
