= PMG =

PMG may refer to:

- PmG (German: Personenzug mit Güterbeförderung, "passenger train with goods service")
- Pacita MG railway station, in San Pedro, Laguna, Philippines
- Pamplin Media Group, US
- Peace Monitoring Group, in Papua New Guinea
- Peace Myanmar Group, a Burmese beverage company
- People Make Games, a journalistic YouTube channel
- Phonomyography
- Poetae Melici Graeci
- Politico-Military Group, a body of the Council of the European Union
- Polymicrogyria
- Ponta Porã International Airport, Brazil
- Postmaster General (disambiguation)
- Postmaster-General's Department, in Australia
