= Cholinergic crisis =

- Other names: Cholinergic toxicity, cholinergic poisoning, SLUDGE syndrome
- Symptoms: Hypersalivation, lacrimation, increased urination and defecation, vomiting, sweating, constricted pupils, spasms
- Complications: Respiratory failure, flaccid paralysis, death
- Causes: Excess synaptic levels of acetylcholine
- Differential diagnosis: Myasthenia gravis
- Medication: Anticholinergics (e.g atropine, diphenhydramine)

A cholinergic crisis is an over-stimulation at a neuromuscular junction due to an excess of acetylcholine, as a result of the inactivity of the acetylcholinesterase enzyme, which normally breaks down acetylcholine.

== Signs and symptoms ==
As a result of cholinergic crisis, the muscles stop responding to the high synaptic levels of acetylcholine, leading to flaccid paralysis, respiratory failure, and other signs and symptoms reminiscent of organophosphate poisoning. Cholinergic crisis is sometimes known by the mnemonic "SLUDGE syndrome" (salivation, lacrimation, urination, defecation, gastrointestinal distress, and emesis).

Some of the symptoms of increased cholinergic stimulation include:

- Salivation: stimulation of the salivary glands
- Lacrimation: stimulation of the lacrimal glands (tearing)
- Urination: relaxation of the internal sphincter muscle of urethra, and contraction of the detrusor muscles
- Defecation
- Gastrointestinal distress: smooth muscle tone changes causing gastrointestinal problems, including cramping
- Emesis: vomiting
- Miosis: constriction of the pupils of the eye via stimulation of the pupillary constrictor muscles
- Muscle spasm: stimulation of skeletal muscle (due to nicotinic acetylcholine receptor stimulation)
- Diaphoresis: increased sweating
- Bronchial secretions

== Causes ==
Cholinergic crisis can be a consequence of:

- Contamination with – or excessive exposure to – certain chemicals including:
  - nerve agents, (e.g., sarin, VX, Novichok agents).
  - organophosphorus insecticides (e.g., parathion)
- Ingestion of certain poisonous fungi (particularly the muscarine-containing members of the genera Inocybe and Clitocybe).
- Too high of a cholinesterase inhibitor dose in patients with myasthenia gravis or while reversing surgical muscle paralysis following general anaesthesia.
- Nicotine poisoning can also be thought of as a subset of cholinergic crisis, as it also involves excessive parasympathetic stimulation.

== Treatment ==
Some elements of the cholinergic crisis can be reversed with antimuscarinic drugs like atropine or diphenhydramine, but the most dangerous effect—respiratory depression—cannot.

The neuromuscular junction, where the brain communicates with muscles (like the diaphragm, the main breathing muscle), works by acetylcholine activating nicotinic acetylcholine receptors and leading to muscle contraction. Atropine only blocks muscarinic acetylcholine receptors (a different receptor class than the nicotinic receptors at the neuromuscular junction), so it will not improve the muscle strength and ability to breathe in someone with cholinergic crisis. Such a patient will require neuromuscular-blocking drugs and mechanical ventilation until the crisis resolves on its own.

== See also ==
- Physostigmine
- Edrophonium
