= Aldrete's scoring system =

Scoring system used in Anaesthesiology

- Purpose: Determining when patients can be safely discharged from the post-anesthesia care unit.

Aldrete's scoring system is a commonly used scale for determining when postsurgical patients can be safely discharged from the post-anesthesia care unit (PACU), generally to a second stage (phase II) recovery area, hospital ward, or home. It was devised in 1970 by Jorge Antonio Aldrete, a Mexican anesthesiologist, while working at the Denver Veterans Affairs Hospital.

== Scoring system ==
The original scoring system was developed before the invention of pulse oximetry and used the patient's colouration as a surrogate marker of their oxygenation status. A modified Aldrete scoring system was described in 1995 which replaces the assessment of skin colouration with the use of pulse oximetry to measure SpO_{2}.

	Original 1970 version	Modified by author in 1995	Additional criteria by Marshall and Chung in 1999 for ambulatory surgery
Activity	Able to move 4 extremities voluntarily or on command (2 Points) Able to move 2 extremities voluntarily or on command (1 Point) Unable to move extremities voluntarily or on command (0 Points)		Steady gait without dizziness or meets pre-anaethetic level (2 Points) Requires Assistance (1 Point) Unable to ambulate (0 Points)
Respiration	Able to breathe deeply and cough freely (2 Points) Dyspnoea or limited breathing (1 Point) Apnoeic (0 Points)		Not included
Circulation	BP $\pm$20% of pre-anaesthetic level (2 Points) BP $\pm$20-49% of pre-anaesthetic level (1 Point) BP $\pm$50% of pre-anaesthetic level (0 Points)	Sometimes heart rate is included (but was not in the author's second paper) Heart rate $\pm$20bpm pre-anaethetic level (2 points) Heart rate $\pm$20-35bpm pre-anaesthetic level Heart rate $\pm$35-50bpm pre-anaesthetic level Patients $\pm$50bpm or >110bpm or with a change in ECG rhythm must be evaluated by an anaesthesiologist. These additional points change the overall target score.	BP $\pm$20% of pre-anaesthetic level (2 Points) BP $\pm$20-40% of pre-anaesthetic level (1 Point) BP $\pm$40% of pre-anaesthetic level (0 Points)
Consciousness	Fully awake (2 Points) Arousable on calling (1 Point) Not responding (0 Points)		Not included
Colour or O_{2} Saturation	Normal (2 Points) Pale, dusky, blotchy, jaundiced, or other (1 Point) Cyanotic (0 Points)	Able to maintain SpO_{2} >92% on room Air (2 Points) Needs supplementary O_{2} to maintain SpO_{2} >90% (1 Point) SpO_{2} <90% despite supplementary O2 (0 Points)	Not Included
Pain			Minimal to no pain, controllable with oral analgesics (2 Points) This target not met (1 Point)
Surgical Bleeding (as expected for procedure)			Minimal/Does not require dressing change (2 Points) Moderate/Up to two dressing changes required (1 Point) Severe/More than three dressing changes required (0 Points)
Nausea and Vomiting			None to minimal (2 Points) Moderate (1 Point) Severe (0 Points)
Interpretation of score	"Score of 9 or greater allows patient to leave Post Anaesthetic Care Unit"		"Patients who score 9 or greater and have an appropriate escort can go home."

== Alternatives ==
The following criteria also exist:

- White in 1999 proposed "fast-track criteria" to determine if patients can be transferred straight from theatre to Phase II recovery. He proposes a minimum overall score of 12 with no score <1 in any category. He includes consciousness, activity, circulation, respiration, oxygen saturations, pain and emesis. This does not include bleeding or urine output. This was used by Song et al. 2004.
- Post anaesthetic discharge scoring system (PADSS) used by Chung et al. 1995.
- Discharge criteria tool used by Brown et al. 2008.
- DASAIM discharge assessment tool used by Gartner et al. 2010.
