= Optomyography =

Optomyography (OMG) was proposed in 2015 as a technique that could be used to monitor muscular activity. It is possible to use OMG for the same applications where Electromyography (EMG) and Mechanomyography (MMG) are used. However, OMG offers superior signal-to-noise ratio and improved robustness against the disturbing factors and limitations of EMG and MMG. The basic principle of OMG is to use active near-infra-red optical sensors to measure the variations in the measured signals that are reflected from the surface of the skin while activating the muscles below and around the skin spot where the photoelectric sensor is focusing to measure the signals reflected from this spot.

== Applications ==
A glasses based optomyography device was patented for measuring facial expressions and emotional responses particularly for mental health monitoring . Generating proper control signals is the most important task to be able to control any kind of a prosthesis, computer game or any other system which contains a human-computer interaction unit or module. For this purpose, surface-Electromyographic (s-EMG) and Mechanomyographic (MMG) signals are measured during muscular activities and used, not only for monitoring and assessing these activities, but also to help in providing efficient rehabilitation treatment for patients with disabilities as well as in constructing and controlling sophisticated prostheses for various types of amputees and disabilities. However, while the existing s-EMG and MMG based systems have compelling benefits, many engineering challenges still remain unsolved, especially with regard to the sensory control system.
