= Edrophonium =

Acetylcholinesterase inhibitor

Clinical data
- Trade names: Tensilon, Enlon
- AHFS/Drugs.com: FDA Professional Drug Information
- ATC code: V04CX07 (WHO)

Legal status
- Legal status: US: Discontinued

Pharmacokinetic data
- Duration of action: 10–30 minutes

Identifiers
- IUPAC name: N-Ethyl-3-hydroxy-N,N-dimethylbenzenaminium
- CAS Number: 312-48-1
- PubChem CID: 8307
- DrugBank: DB01010
- ChemSpider: 8006
- UNII: 70FP3JLY7N
- KEGG: D00994
- ChEBI: CHEBI:4759
- ChEMBL: ChEMBL1128
- CompTox Dashboard (EPA): DTXSID4046943

Chemical and physical data
- Formula: C_{10}H_{16}NO^{+}
- Molar mass: 166.244 g·mol^{−1}
- 3D model (JSmol): Interactive image
- SMILES: [Cl-].Oc1cccc(c1)[N+](C)(CC)C
- InChI: InChI=1S/C10H15NO.ClH/c1-4-11(2,3)9-6-5-7-10(12)8-9;/h5-8H,4H2,1-3H3;1H; Key:BXKDSDJJOVIHMX-UHFFFAOYSA-N

Edrophonium, formerly sold under the brand name Tensilon among others, is a readily reversible acetylcholinesterase inhibitor. It prevents breakdown of the neurotransmitter acetylcholine and acts by competitively inhibiting the enzyme acetylcholinesterase, mainly at the neuromuscular junction.

== Medical uses ==
Edrophonium (by the so-called Tensilon test) is used to differentiate myasthenia gravis from cholinergic crisis and Lambert-Eaton myasthenic syndrome. In myasthenia gravis, the body produces autoantibodies which block, inhibit or destroy nicotinic acetylcholine receptors in the neuromuscular junction. Edrophonium—an effective acetylcholinesterase inhibitor— reduces the muscle weakness by blocking the enzymatic effect of acetylcholinesterase enzymes, prolonging the presence of acetylcholine in the synaptic cleft. It binds to a Serine-103 allosteric site, while pyridostigmine and neostigmine bind to the acetylcholinesterase active site for their inhibitory effects. In a cholinergic crisis, where a person has too much neuromuscular stimulation, edrophonium will make the muscle weakness worse by inducing a depolarizing block. However, the edrophonium and ice pack tests are no longer recommended as first-line tests due to false positive results. In practice, the edrophonium test has been replaced by testing for autoantibodies, including acetylcholine receptor autoantibodies and muscle specific tyrosine kinase autoantibodies.

The Tensilon test may also be used to predict if neurotoxic paralysis caused by snake envenomation is presynaptic or postsynaptic. If it is postsynaptic, then paralysis will be temporally reversed, indicating that can be reversed by adequate antivenom therapy. If the neurotoxicity is presynaptic, then the Tensilon test will show no response and antivenom will not reverse such paralysis. In this instance reversal of paralysis will not occur until the damaged terminal axons at the neuromuscular junction have recovered, this may take days or weeks.

The drug may also be used for reversal of neuromuscular blockade at the end of a surgical procedure.

== Chemistry ==
Edrophonium, ethyl-(3-hydroxyphenyl)dimethylammonium chloride, is made by reacting 3-dimethylaminophenol with ethyl bromide, which forms ethyl(3-hydroxyphenyl)dimethylammonium bromide, the bromine atom of which is replaced with a chlorine atom by reacting it with silver chloride, giving edrophonium.

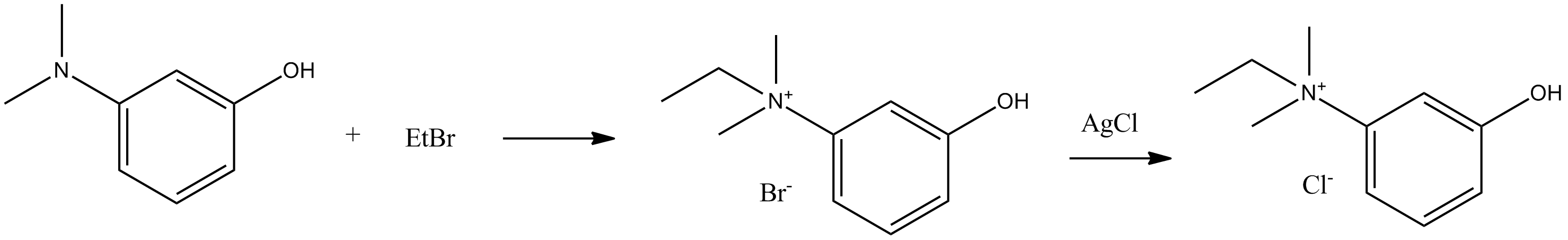

== Pharmacokinetics ==
The drug has a brief duration of action, about 10–30 mins.
