= Organ bath =

Experimental technique

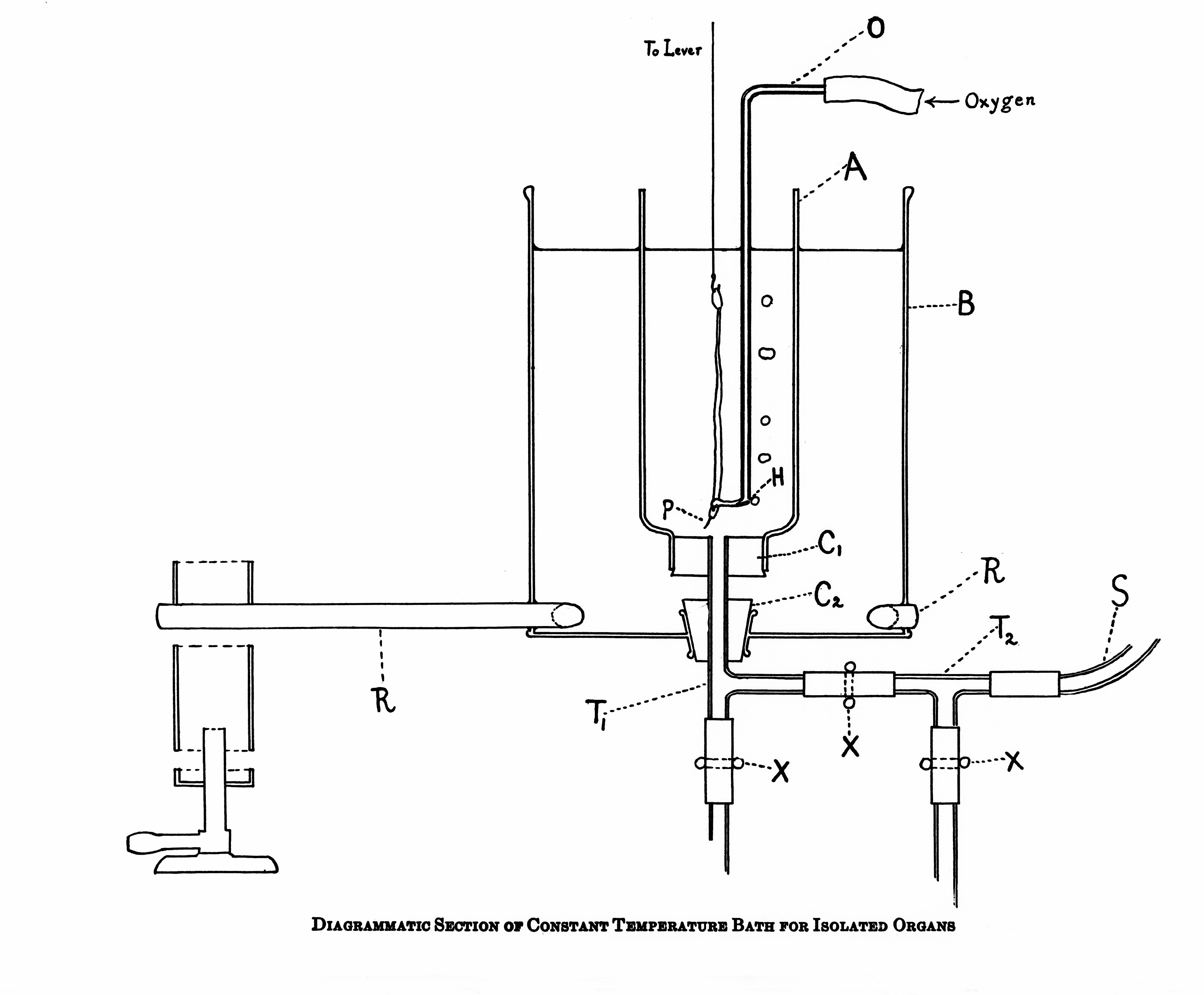
Diagram of a typical organ bath preparation. An excised piece of smooth muscle tissue is held in an oxygenated solution in a chamber. The tissue is attached to a lever, which transmits its contraction to a myograph, thus recording the physiological response. Drugs under investigation can be administered directly to the chamber.

An organ chamber, organ bath, or isolated tissue bath, is a chamber in which isolated organs or tissues can be administered with drugs, or stimulated electrically, in order to measure their function. The tissue in the organ bath is typically oxygenated with carbogen and kept in a solution such as Tyrode's solution or lactated Ringer's solution. Historically, they have also been called gut baths.

== Overview ==
It is used in pharmacology research, particularly when studying the contraction of smooth muscle in tissues such as ileum, colon, vas deferens, trachea, bladder, corpus cavernosum, and blood vessels such as aortic rings. The contraction of smooth muscle tissues can be readily measured with a myograph; this type of physiological response is more readily quantifiable than that of other tissues. Organ baths were originally developed to study the effects of agonists and antagonists on excitable tissues, such as nervous tissue and muscle though they have been adapted to study tissues such as epithelium. Typical tissues and receptors studied with organ bath preparations include nicotinic, muscarinic, and histamine receptors in the ileum or beta adrenoceptors in the bladder. Tissues are typically taken from rodents, such as guinea pigs, mice, and rats.

For studying the effects of drugs on receptors in drug discovery and combinatorial chemistry, novel techniques such as high throughput screening, ultrahigh throughput screening and high content screening, pharmacogenomics, proteomics, and array technology have largely superseded the use of organ baths. These techniques can allow more receptor specificity than organ bath preparations, as a single tissue sample can express many different receptor types.

The use of organ bath preparations for the measurement of physiological tissue responses to drug concentrations allows the generation of dose response curves. This in turn allows the quantification of a drug's pharmacological profile in the tissue in question, such as the calculation of the drug's EC50, IC50, and Hill coefficient.

== Historical contributions ==
Examples of important contributions made using this technique include:

- The 1921 discovery by Otto Loewi of Vagusstoff using frog hearts resulted in the identification of acetylcholine as the first neurotransmitter.
- Enkephalin using bioassays such as the mouse vas deferens as a bioassay.
- Nitric oxide using both assays of bull retractor penis and aortic ring.
