= Mechanomyogram =

The mechanomyogram (MMG) is the mechanical signal observable from the surface of a muscle when the muscle is contracted. At the onset of muscle contraction, gross changes in the muscle shape cause a large peak in the MMG. Subsequent vibrations are due to oscillations of the muscle fibres at the resonance frequency of the muscle. The mechanomyogram is also known as the phonomyogram, acoustic myogram, sound myogram, vibromyogram or muscle sound.

== Signal characteristics ==
The MMG is a low frequency vibration that may be observed when a muscle is contracted using suitable measuring techniques.

== Measurement techniques ==
It can be measured using an accelerometer or a microphone placed on the skin over the belly of the muscle. When measured using a microphone, it may be termed the acoustic myogram.

== Uses ==
The MMG may provide a useful alternative to the electromyogram (EMG) for monitoring muscle activity. It has a higher signal-to-noise ratio than the surface EMG and thus can be used to monitor muscle activity from deeper muscles without using invasive measurement techniques. It is currently the subject of research activity into prosthetic control and assistive technologies for the disabled.

== History ==
Muscle sounds were first described in print by the Jesuit scientist Francesco Maria Grimaldi in a posthumous publication of 1665, which influenced the work of the English physician William Hyde Wollaston and the German physicist Paul Erman. The latter enlisted the aid of René Laennec. Mechanical amplification was first employed by Hermann von Helmholtz. The past two centuries of repeated rediscovery and neglect of the phenomenon were summarised by Stokes and Blythe in 2001.
