= Post-anesthesia care unit =

Medical recovery room

A post-anesthesia care unit (PACU) and sometimes referred to as post-anesthesia recovery or PAR, or simply recovery, is a part of hospitals, ambulatory care centers, and other medical facilities. Patients who received general anesthesia, regional anesthesia, or local anesthesia are transferred from the operating room suites to the recovery area. The patients are monitored typically by anesthesiologists, nurse anesthetists, and other medical staff. Providers follow a standardized handoff to the medical PACU staff that includes which medications were given in the operating room suites, how hemodynamics were during the procedures, and what is expected for their recovery. After initial assessment and stabilization, patients are monitored for any potential complications, until the patient is transferred back to their hospital rooms–or in the case of some outpatient surgeries, discharged to their responsible person (driver).

== Initial handoff ==
The initial handoff, or otherwise referred as handover, is an interdisciplinary transfer of essential and critical patient information from one healthcare provider to another. Variations do exist depending on certain hospitals, medical facilities, and patient presentations. The most common information includes:

- Patient Name and Date of Birth
- Allergies, Past Medical History, Relevant Home Medications
- Operating Room Course:
  - Preoperative medications received
  - Access for medications (IV lines, Gauges used, Locations)
  - Anesthetics Type
  - Airway, Relaxant, Reversal
  - Antibiotics, Analgesics, Antiemetics Administered
  - Other Medications
  - Fluids administered and volume status
  - Any Complications or concerns
- Relevant information specific for patient's case for PACU staff to monitor
- Specific recommendations for the post-anesthesia plan of care

== Monitoring ==
As the patient remains in the PACU, the following are consistently monitored by medical professionals:

- Vital signs (Heart Rate, Blood Pressure, Temperature, and Respiratory Rate)
- Electrocardiogram
- Saturation of Oxygen (SpO2)
- Airway Patency
- Mental Status
- Neuromuscular Function
- Postoperative pain
- Surgical sites for excessive bleeding, mucopurulent discharge, swelling, hematomas, wound healing, and infection

Vital signs are obtained every 5 minutes for the first 15 minutes. The PACU staff monitor that the Respiratory Rate and Saturation of Oxygen remain as close to baseline of that patient while the heart rate and blood pressure remain within 20% of their baseline values.

More intensive care monitoring may include:

- Preparation and education for the use of patient-controlled analgesia (PCA) units for postoperative pain control
- Preparation and administration of intravenous, epidural, or perineural infusions
- Invasive monitoring such as arterial lines, central venous lines, and ventriculostomies

== Postoperative complications ==
Depending on the use of inhalation anesthestics, post operative nausea and vomiting (PONV) is one of the most common complications to monitor in the immediate postoperative period. Patients do receive antiemetic medications, such as Ondansetron and Dexamethasone, during the surgical procedure if the patient is at risk for it. Along with PONV, there are numerous complications that can happen with many different organ systems, the most threatening of which involves the respiratory system, and cardiovascular system.

=== Respiratory system/airway complications ===
Risk Factors are factored into account to assess for complications during the preoperative assessment. Some factors include preexisting factors such as chronic obstructive pulmonary disease (COPD), asthma, obstructive sleep apnea (OSA), obesity, heart failure, and pulmonary hypertension.

Clinical signs and symptoms are assessed to indicate any respiratory system complications, such as Tachypnea (RR > 20 breaths/min), Bradypnea (RR < 12 breaths/min), SpO2 <93%, Anxiety, Confusion, or Agitation with resulting Tachycardia and Hypertension.

The life-threatening complications that are monitored in PACU include:

- Laryngospasm
- Respiratory arrest
- Airway Edema
- Foreign Body
- Cervical Hematoma
- Bronchospasm
- Pulmonary Edema
- Tension Pneumothorax
- Pulmonary Embolism
- Atelectasis

=== Cardiovascular system complications ===
Cardiovascular complications such as arrhythmias and hemodynamic Instability are the third most common postoperative complication. The risk factors that are assessed preoperatively include the severity of any preexisting cardiovascular comorbidities, such as congestive heart failure, valvular heart disease, and myocardial infarctions. The medical professional also assesses if the patient has had any recent traumas and the severity of perioperative stresses such as blood loss, fluid shifts, and hypotension.

Clinical signs and symptoms are assessed to indicate any cardiovascular system complications, specifically hemodynamic instability and vital signs.

==== Hypotension ====
Patients who undergo major procedures that deal with volume status perioperatively can be at risk for hypotension due to fluid shifts or significant bleeding. Hemoglobin is measured and monitored if significant bleeding could have occurred. Treatment includes either replacement of the lost blood products as pRBC, or with crystalloid solutions while monitoring electrolyte abnormalities in Lactated Ringers Solution, Normal Saline, or Crystalloid. Patients can also experience life-threatening hypotensive shock due to hemorrhage, sepsis, cardiogenic, or anaphylactic.

== See also ==
- Aldrete's scoring system
- Anesthesia
- Anesthesiologist
- Anesthetic technician
- Intensive care unit
- Nurse anesthetist
- Operating department practitioner
