= Phonomyography =

- Synonyms: Sound myography
- Purpose: measure force of muscle contraction

Phonomyography (PMG) (also known as acoustic myography, sound myography, vibromyography, and surface mechanomyogram) is a technique to measure the force of muscle contraction by recording the low frequency sounds created during muscular activity.

Although, until recently, less precise than the more traditional mechanomyography, it is considerably easier to set up. The signal is measured using condenser microphone elements, piezoelectric sensors, accelerometers, or a combination of sensors attached to the skin. Hydrophones have also been used to measure muscles immersed in water. Improvements in microphones and contact transducers (piezoelectric devices), as well as recording systems, has meant that they have become available in a size and of a quality that enables them to be applied to a normal daily setting outside the clinic and the laboratory setting. These new possibilities provide a clinical tool for the assessment of patients with musculoskeletal complaints during daily activities, or assessment of athletes in terms of efficiency in use of muscles.

The sound created by muscle movement can be heard with the ear pressed up to a contracting muscle, but most of the energy is low frequency, below 20 Hz, making it inaudible infrasound.

Electromyography signals are typically bandpass filtered from 10 Hz to 500 Hz, by comparison. PMG signals are limited to 5 Hz to 100 Hz in some experiments. Orizio states that the low-frequency response of the sensor is the most important feature, and should go as low as 1 Hz.

Images of PMG waves are available in this creative commons-licensed document, "Mechanomyographic amplitude and frequency responses during dynamic muscle actions: a comprehensive review".

== History ==
Muscle sounds were first described in print by the Jesuit scientist Francesco Maria Grimaldi in a posthumous publication of 1665, which influenced the work of the English physician William Hyde Wollaston and the German scientist Paul Erman. The latter enlisted the aid of René Laennec. Mechanical amplification was first employed by Hermann von Helmholtz. The past two centuries of repeated rediscovery and neglect of the phenomenon were summarised by Stokes and Blythe in 2001.
