= Agentase Chemical Agent Detection Kit =

Chemical detection kit

The Agentase Chemical Agent Detection (CAD) Kit, formerly known as the Fido C1 CAD Kit, is an enzyme-based chemical detection kit that contains six different sensors that are designed to detect specific chemical warfare agents (CWAs) and other toxic chemical contaminants at trace levels. The kit is provided in a small pouch and can detect the presence of the chemical agents within five minutes.

In 2004, one of the sensors from the Agentase CAD Kit, the Agentase Nerve Agent Sensor, was recognized by the U.S. Army as one of ten “Greatest Army Inventions” of 2003.

== History ==
The development of the Agentase CAD Kit first began as a collaboration between Alan Russell from the University of Pittsburgh and researchers from the Army Research Office (ARO), an extramural basic research component of the U.S. Army Research Laboratory (ARL).

Russell was researching the interface between enzymes and polymers and was investigating how to create a polymer sponge-like material that could detect the pH-dependent catalytic activity of enzymes. In the early 1990s, Russell reached out to ARO with a research proposal to explore a variety of enzymes that had differing responses to temperature and pressure. The scientists at ARO accepted the proposal and coordinated research efforts with the University of Pittsburgh. The combined efforts led to the discovery of a functional catalytic buffering system that could detect the presence of nerve agents, and Russell published the paper reporting this discovery in 2002.

Following the publication, the Defense Advanced Research Projects Agency (DARPA) and the Defense Threat Reduction Agency (DTRA) facilitated the process to turn the discovery into a commercially viable product, resulting in the development of the handheld Nerve Agent Sensor, a pen-shaped sensor with enzyme-containing polymers at the tip that could identify the presence of nerve agents like VX and sarin with a color change from yellow to red. Russell and his former student, Keith LeJeune, then co-founded a private company called Agentase LLC to manufacture enzyme-based sensors.

In 2003, Agentase LLC developed warfare-grade blood and blister agent sensors that could detect the presence of mustard gas and other hydrogen cyanide and cyanogen chloride-based agents. Around the same time, the company enhanced the capabilities of the Nerve Agent Sensor to develop the Nerve Agent Sensing Biopolymer Wipe, an enzyme-based biosensor that could detect nerve agents at surfaces, in solution, and in the air. With the help of a program developed by ARL chief scientist Stephen Lee that enforced decontamination and protection against chemical warfare, the U.S. Defense Intelligence Agency fielded the Agentase’s nerve sensors and its blood and blister agent sensors in the war in both Iraq and Afghanistan.

By 2005, Agentase LLC assembled together the Agentase CAD Kit, which bundled the nerve sensors with the blood and blister sensors in single kit. The Agentase CAD Kit was marketed not only to the U.S. Department of Defense but also to emergency first responders and chemical workers that handled hazardous materials.

In the late 2000s, Agentase LLC, with support from the Army Research Laboratory, developed the Agentase Chemical Agent Disclosure (CAD) spray, a spray-based product that detected the presence of nerve agents and pinpointed their location on surfaces. Agentase LLC was later acquired by FLIR Systems in 2010.

== Sensors ==
=== Nerve Agent Sensor ===
The Nerve Agent Sensor detects the presence of specific chemical agents by reading the pH levels of the target through the use of hydrolytic enzymes. Previously, the use of catalytic hydrolysis reactions to degrade nerve agents faced problems due to the subsequent generation of acid that led to a severe drop in pH levels. High concentrations of a nerve agent have caused the buffering capacity to exceed and the pH to drop drastically. In order to keep the pH in an optimum range, the Nerve Agent Sensor employed a low-molecular-weight material that would convert into a base only when it was demanded, i.e. when the substrate was hydrolyzed and the pH began to drop. The sensor used an acid-producing enzyme in combination with a base-producing enzyme, each with different pH-dependent activity profiles, so that the relative rates of each enzyme changed as the pH changed, causing the pH levels to stabilize.

Due to its high sensitivity, the Nerve Agent Sensor demonstrated considerable resistance to environmental factors, such as high temperatures, as well as interference from other compounds. It also has a shelf life of two to three years.

=== Nerve Agent Sensing Biopolymer Wipe ===
The Nerve Agent Sensing Biopolymer Wipe acts as a biosensor that is capable of detecting specific nerve agents on surfaces, in solution, and in the air. It maintains a dynamic pH equilibrium by utilizing the pH-dependent catalytic activity of a base-producing enzyme and an acid-producing enzyme. The production of acid stems from butyrylcholinesterase (BChE)-catalyzed butyrylcholine hydrolysis while the production of base stems from urease-catalyzed urea hydrolysis. When both enzyme systems are active, the pH remains constant. However, the presence of a nerve agent causes cholinesterase to become inhibited and the hydroxide ion production from urea hydrolysis rapidly increases the pH level.

The biopolymer wipe has exhibited several notable characteristics, including high sensitivity to CWAs, resistance to high temperatures, an almost-immediate response rate, and a shelf life as long as five years.

== Operation ==
Emergency responders could use this kit to conduct surface cross-examination for the presence of nerve (G and V series), blood (AC), blister (AC) agents, acids, bases, aldehydes, and oxidizers. The Agentase kit acted similar to a glow stick. The operator cracked the ampule inside the sensor barrel which released the enzyme solution into a sponge. The sponge was then applied directly to a surface for sample collection. Each sensor provided color codes so that chemical detection results could be understood by personnel without extensive training and skills. The kit was used in several military, law enforcement, and emergency response scenarios.
