= History of electroconvulsive therapy in the United States =

The development of electroconvulsive therapy (ECT) is often credited to the Italian physician Ugo Cerletti. The first ECT treatment was performed in 1938 by Cerletti and his colleague in Italy. ECT was introduced in the United States in 1939 by Renato Almassi. From 1940s to late 1950s, ECT was widely used and many physicians continued to refine the technique.

ECT was initially performed without anesthesia or muscle relaxants. Patients were fully awake and nurses were instructed to restrain the patient’s body during the seizure. It was not until the 1930s that anesthetics were introduced and 1940s when muscle relaxants began to be used.

== Origins of ECT ==
The use of electricity as medical treatment dates back to the Romans in 47 AD. Back then, it was used for a variety of conditions such as headache, paralysis, gout, and epilepsy. Beginning in the 16th century, it was observed that seizures could, at times, improve mental illness. In fact, Paracelsus induced seizures by giving camphor as a treatment for “lunacy.” However, it was not until the 20th century that induced seizures were successfully used as a treatment for mental illness, reflecting what is now known as electroconvulsive therapy (ECT). In 1934, Hungarian psychiatrist Ladislas Meduna believed that people with schizophrenia had an excess of glial cells, while those with epilepsy had a deficiency. Based on this theory, he believed that schizophrenia could be treated by inducing seizures. To test this idea, he induced a grand mal seizure in a patient with schizophrenia by injecting camphor. The patient went on to receive several additional treatments and eventually made a full recovery. After this patient, Meduna successfully treated 5 more patients with schizophrenia.

The development of ECT is often credited to the Italian physician Ugo Cerletti. In 1935, Cerletti used metrazol to induce seizures for the treatment of schizophrenia. He later considered using electricity to induce seizures and began testing the idea on animals. He tested several electrode placements but many of these experiments resulted in the death of the animals. It was his colleague, Lucio Bini, who suggested bitemporal placement, a method that is still used today. Through these experiments, they determined the therapeutic range for the dose of electrical current. In April 1938, Cerletti and Bini performed the first ECT treatment on a patient using electrical current. The patient was a 39-year-old man who was found wandering in a train station and was later diagnosed with schizophrenia. He received a total of 11 treatments and made full recovery. This marked the first demonstration that seizures could be safely and effective induced using electrical current to treat mental illness. In May 1938, Cerletti and Bini presented their findings at the Royal Medical Academy in Rome, and the ECT device was patented the following year.

== Early use of ECT (1940s-1950s) ==
Lothar Kalinowsky, a German psychiatrist, was part of the team with Cerletti that studied the effects of ECT. In fact, he was at the second ECT administered by Cerletti. In 1939, Kalinowsky left Rome to escape the Nazis and traveled across Europe, eventually arriving in the United States in 1940. He developed his own ECT machine in Rome; however, its arrival was delayed by 10 years during shipping due to the war.

It was a colleague of Cerletti, Renato Almassi, who brought the first ECT machine from Italy to the United States in 1939. The following year, he and American physician, David Impastato, carried out the first ECT treatment in the United States. The patient was a 29-year-old woman with schizophrenia and was treated at Columbus Hospital in New York City.

In May 1940, psychiatrist Douglas Goldman demonstrated ECT at the annual American Psychiatrist Association meeting. Later that year, Kalinowsky began treating patients with ECT at the New York State Psychiatric Institute. From this point through the 1950s, ECT became widely used in the treatment of psychiatric disorders. In fact, it was widely used by the U.S. miliary during World War II.

The electrodes in ECT were initially placed bilaterally. In 1949, Goldman proposed unilateral electrode placement to avoid the speech area of the brain. He reported that unilateral placement resulted in less post-treatment confusion.

Max Fink, a neurologist and psychiatrist, was one of the first to recognize the importance of using electrocephalography (EEG) as a tool in the ECT research. He was appointed the Chief of the ECT service at Hillside Hospital in 1954 and later became the Director of the Department of Experimental Psychiatry in 1958, where he conducted most of his research.

== The decline of ECT (1960s-1980s) ==
The introduction of antidepressant medications in the 1950s contributed to the decline in the use of ECT.

The counterculture in the 1960s contributed to the growing opposition to institutionalized psychiatry. The negative perceptions against ECT was further perpetuated by the 1962 novel, “One Flew Over the Cuckoo’s Nest”, and its 1975 film adaptation.

Beginning in the late 1960s, L. Ron Hubbard, the founder of Scientology, wrote extensively criticizing psychiatry, describing it as the reason for “humanity’s decline.” He argued that psychiatric treatments, including “electric shocks, behavior modification, abuse of the soul” contributed to criminal behavior. Hubbard also claimed that Scientology could “undo the negative effects that psychiatrists and mental health personnel have had on humans.”

== The return of ECT (1980s and beyond) ==
The use of ECT increased in the early 1980s. It has been estimated that in 1980, 2.5% of psychiatric patients at the hospital received ECT. This increase has been attributed in part to advances in anesthesia techniques, which improved the safety of the treatment. Another contributing factor was efforts to standardize the technique. In 1978, the American Psychiatric Association (APA) assembled a task force that published guidelines outlining consent requirements and recommended unilateral electrode placement. In 1990, a second task force published guidelines on the delivery, education and training of ECT. In 2001, a subsequent task published recommendations on the role of ECT in modern medicine and emphasize the importance of informed consent.

== Use of anesthesia in ECT ==
In its early use, ECT was performed without anesthesia or muscle relaxants. Patients were fully awake and a tongue depressor was placed between the upper and lower molars for them to bite on during the treatment. During the seizure, nurses helped to restrain the patient’s body. In large state hospitals, patients were often lined up while the ECT machine was moved from one patient to another, allowing many patients to be treated in a short period of time.

During the 1940s and 1950s, ECT was commonly administered by psychiatrists in their offices or during “house calls.” During a “house call”, the psychiatrist would bring an ECT machine and a nurse to the patient’s home and perform the treatment on the patient’s bed. In either setting, anesthesia and muscle relaxants were not commonly used. As a result, patients frequently experienced a variety of physical injuries, including compression fractures of the vertebrae, extremities and teeth.

=== Muscle relaxants ===
In the 1940s, psychiatrists began using curare as a muscle relaxant, though it was later replaced by a safer alternative, succinylcholine in the early 1950s. Due to its superior safety profile, succinylcholine became widely used and was the preferred muscle relaxant late 1950s. Despite its favorable safety profile, succinylcholine can cause serious side effects, including prolonged neuromuscular blockage in individuals with pseudocholinesterase deficiency. Other side effects include bradyarrhythmia, myalgia, hyperthermia and hyperkalemia. As a result, the search for a safer muscle relaxant continues.

Pancuronium was discovered in 1964, followed by vecuronium, an analogue of pancuronium, in 1973. Vecuronium was approved for use in ECT in 1984; however it was mainly used in patients with severe succinylcholine-induced myalgias. It remained less preferred than succinylcholine because of its significantly longer duration of action.

Mivacurium was discovered in 1981 and approved by the FDA in 1992. It was primarily used in patients who developed malignant hyperthermia-like reactions to succinylcholine. Mivacurium came off the market in 2006 after the loss of a supplier that provided a key ingredient used in its manufacture. Mivacurium was reintroduced in 2016, although by that time other agents had become more widely used.

Rocuronium was discovered in 1994 and approved by the FDA in 1995 as another agent for use in ECT. It has a shorter duration of action than vecuronium and does not cause the muscle fasciculations associated with succinylcholine. Its use more common after the approval of its reversal agent, sugammadex in 2015.

Rapacuronium was approved by the FDA in 1999 but was withdrawn from the market in 2001 because of fatal respiratory complications.

=== Anesthetics ===
Barbiturates were the first medications used to induced general anesthesia in ECT. Several barbiturates were discovered in the 1930s, including thiopental, which was commonly used because of its availability. However, it was associated with several side effects including sinus bradycardia and premature ventricular contractions. Production of thiopental was ultimately suspended in 2009 due in part to negative perceptions related to its use in lethal injection.

Methohexital, a methylated barbiturate, was developed in 1956. It was considered superior to thiopental because of its greater potency with more rapid recovery. Because of this, methohexital was routinely used by the early 1960s. In fact, it was recommended by the American Psychiatric Associated as the drug of choice for inducing anesthesia in ECT. However, it fell out of favor in the early 2000s following a nationwide recall, manufacturing delays and limited availability. Although it became widely available again in 2006 but other anesthetic agents had largely replaced it.

Ketamine was developed in 1962 and approved for use in the United States in 1970. It was widely used during the Vietnam War. One of its advantages is its high safety profile. However, it has a slower onset when compared with methohexital and can cause delirium during recovery from anesthesia. As a result, it was often used when methohexital was not an option.

Etomidate was developed in 1964 and introduced for use in the United States in 1983. It considered one of the most efficacious intravenous anesthetic for producing adequate seizure duration and lowering the seizure threshold. However, it was associated with several side effects including myoclonus, increase post-ECT confusion, and adrenal suppression.

Propofol was developed in 1977 and approved for use in the United States in 1989. One of its advantages is its short duration of action and rapid clearance from the body, resulting in faster recovery times. It also produces a shorter seizure duration, which is beneficial in children and adolescents, who often experience longer seizures during ECT. However, for the same reason, propofol is less effective in adults compared with other anesthetic agents. When compared with other agents, its use in ECT often requires a higher electrical charge and a greater number of treatments. Unfortunately, in 2009 propofol gained negative attention for its role in the death of Michael Jackson. In 2010, shortages of the drug occurred after reports of unsanitary use of vials that infected patients with hepatitis C. In addition, Hospira, a manufacturer of propofol, was found to be noncompliant with the FDA’s manufacturing practices and shut down one of its production plants.
