= Dibucaine number =

Dibucaine, also known as cinchocaine, is an amino amide local anesthetic. When administered to humans intravenously, it is capable of inhibiting the plasma cholinesterase (butyrylcholinesterase) enzyme. The dibucaine number is used to differentiate individuals who have substitution mutations (point mutations) of the enzyme's gene, resulting in decreased enzyme function.

== Metabolism ==
Plasma cholinesterase is also known as butyrylcholinesterase, in part because once an individual is given butyrylcholine intravenously, the enzyme converts it to the products butyric acid and choline. This tetrameric enzyme is responsible for the metabolism of a number of substances, including amino ester local anesthetics and succinylcholine, which it hydrolyses in two stages to succinyl monocholine and choline, then to succinic acid and a second molecule of choline. Dibucaine inhibits normal butyrylcholinesterase activity, reducing the ability to convert butyrylcholine to its byproducts. The extent of the catalysis can be determined by measuring the percentage of butyrylcholine that remains unchanged in the blood of individuals administered a standard dose after dibucaine inhibition challenge in what has been established as the dibucaine number test. Kalow and Genest first described this means of determining butyrylcholinesterase activity in 1957. Typical measurement of dibucaine number in the United States yields values of 80 and above for wild type homozygotes (normal), 40–60 for heterozygotes (atypical), and 20 or less for atypical homozygotes.

== Dibucaine number ==
The dibucaine number is used to differentiate individuals who have substitution mutations of the butyrylcholinesterase enzyme resulting in decreased enzyme function. At least one substitution mutation has been characterized that is capable of altering the efficiency of enzymatic catalysis. Reduced butyrylcholinesterase activity may occur as a result of inherited or acquired causes. Inherited reductions in butyrylcholinesterase activity occur because of mutations at a single autosomal location on the long arm of chromosome 3. Physiologic reductions may occur with extremes of age and during pregnancy. Other acquired causes of decreased activity include kidney and liver disease, malignancy (cancer), malnutrition, and burns. In the inherited type, an individual receives a gene from each parent, one of which may be the wild type butyrylcholinesterase, or the mutant. Thus, there may be individuals who are homozygous for the wild type butyrylcholinesterase (normal) or the mutant butyrylcholinesterase (incidence 1/3200), and there is the group of heterozygotes with one of each (incidence 1/480).

== Point mutation ==
Miller's Anesthesia notes that a point mutation in the gene for human serum cholinesterase has been identified that changes Asp-70 to Gly in the atypical form of serum cholinesterase. The mutation in nucleotide 209, which changes codon 70 from GAT to GGT, was found by sequencing a genomic clone and sequencing selected regions of DNA amplified by the polymerase chain reaction. McGuire et al. compared the entire coding sequences for usual and atypical cholinesterases, and found no other consistent base differences. They described a polymorphic site near the C terminus of the coded region, but neither allele at this locus segregated consistently with the atypical trait. They conclude that the Asp-70 to Gly mutation (acidic to neutral amino acid substitution) accounts for reduced affinity of atypical cholinesterase for choline esters and that Asp-70 must be an important component of the anionic site. Heterogeneity in atypical alleles may exist, but the Asp-70 point mutation may represent an appreciable portion of the atypical gene pool.

More recently, Gaffney and Campbell have described a PCR-based method to identify the Kalow allele for butyrylcholinesterase. A quantitative variant of the usual gene and was shown to result from a single base pair change in the DNA as described above. A new method based on the polymerase chain reaction to distinguish Kalow alleles of the cholinesterase gene was developed. Using the amplification refractory mutagenesis system, two different reactions distinguished the presence of a guanine (normal E1u allele) from that of an adenine (Kalow E1k allele) at nucleotide 1615 within the coding sequences of the gene. The frequency of the Kalow allele in their sample of 51 individuals was determined to be 20%. The mean total cholinesterase activity in heterozygotes was 90% of that in persons who typed as E1uE1u homozygotes. Two E1kE1k homozygotes were identified and their cholinesterase activities were the two lowest measured.

== Distinction ==
The distinctive quality of dibucaine is that its enzyme inhibition of the wild type butyrylcholinesterase (Typical) is substantially greater than that of the mutant butyrylcholinesterase (Atypical). Thus, the atypical enzyme is said to be resistant to dibucaine inhibition. This can be used to distinguish individuals in the aforementioned genetic classes. Lockridge and La Du measured atypical and usual human serum cholinesterases with the fluorescent probe, N-methyl-(7-dimethylcarbamoxy)quinolinium iodide. Four active sites per tetramer were found in each enzyme. The turnover numbers of usual and atypical cholinesterases were the same: 15,000 μmol of benzoylcholine hydrolyzed/min/μmol of active site; 48,000 min^{−1} for o-nitrophenylbutyrate; and 0.0025 min^{−1} for N-methyl-(7-dimethylcarbamoxy)quinolinium iodide. They had identical rate constants for carbamylation, (5.0 min^{−1}) and for decarbamylation (0.15 h^{−1}). The major difference between the two genetically determined forms of the enzyme was substrate affinity, K_{D} being 0.16 mM for usual and 5.4 mM for atypical cholinesterase, for the fluorescent probe substrate. K_{m} for the uncharged ester, o-nitrophenylbutyrate, was 0.14 mM for both enzymes, whereas K_{m} for benzoylcholine was 0.005 mM for usual and 0.024 mM for atypical cholinesterase. This means that the two enzymes differ only in the structure of their anionic site.

== Neuromuscular blocking ==
When given succinylcholine, a commonly used neuromuscular-blocking drug administered for general anesthesia during surgery, the heterozygous and mutant homozygous individual will experience a prolonged duration of action of neuromuscular blockade. This results in unexpected and unwanted postoperative respiratory muscle paralysis requiring mechanical ventilation in such patients. The duration of such paralysis may last from hours to days. To identify susceptible individuals, the dibucaine number can be determined so as to alert the care team to the risks of use of butyrylcholinesterase substrates. Pestel et al. measured 24,830 Dibucaine numbers over a period of four years in a European trial. Numbers below 30 (atypical homozygous) were found in 0.07% (n=18) giving an incidence of 1:1,400. Dibucaine numbers from 30 to 70 (atypical heterozygous) were found in 1.23% (n=306). On the basis of identification of the Dibucaine numbers we could avoid the administration of succinylcholine resulting in a cost reduction of 12,280 Euro offset against the total laboratory costs amounting to 10,470 Euro.

== Cost effect ==
This incidence is higher than documented in the literature. Pestel et al. conclude that routine measurement of dibucaine number is a cost-effective method of identifying patients at increased risk of prolonged neuromuscular blockade due to atypical cholinesterase. It is currently not standard practice to obtain such testing prior to surgery. Today, dibucaine number is typically determined after an episode of prolonged paralysis following administration of succinylcholine in order to explain the cause of the incident. Succinylcholine duration is usually on the order of 7–15 minutes and the extent of blockade is monitored with a neuromuscular stimulator. If activity at the motor endplate is not reestablished, as determined by nerve stimulator testing, an anesthesiologist will grow concerned that the patient may have a mutant form of the plasma cholinesterase enzyme and will withhold subsequent dosing of neuromuscular blocking agents until return of function.
