= David J. Impastato =

American neuropsychiatrist (1903 - 1986)

David John Impastato
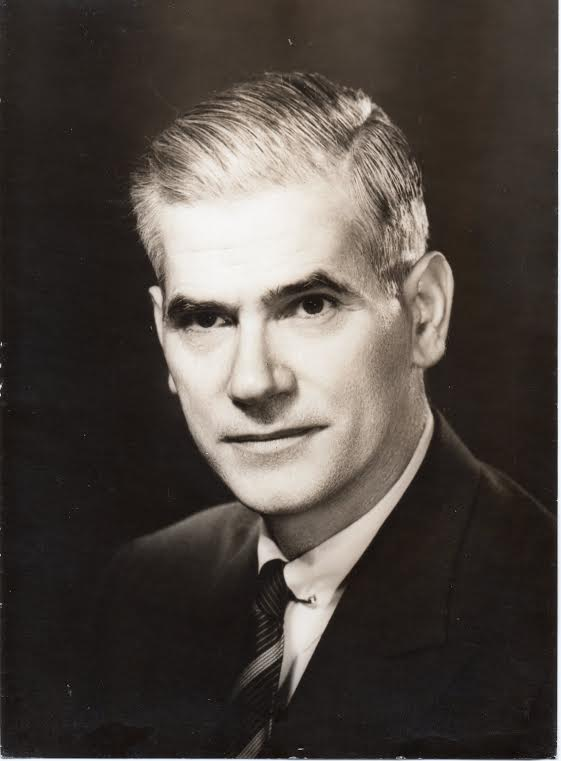
- Born: January 8, 1903; Mazara del Vallo, Sicily
- Died: February 28, 1986 (aged 83); Pasadena, California
- Citizenship: United States (Naturalized in 1928)
- Education: George Washington University Medical School
- Known for: Pioneer of electroconvulsive therapy in the U.S.
- Scientific career
- Fields: Psychiatry, neurology, medicine
- Workplaces: Bellevue, Gracie Square Hospital, Columbus Hospital, New York University

David John Impastato (January 8, 1903 – February 28, 1986) was an American neuropsychiatrist who pioneered the use of electroconvulsive therapy (ECT) in the United States. A treatment for mental illness initially called "electroshock," ECT was developed in 1937 by Dr. Ugo Cerletti and Lucio Bini, working in Rome. Impastato has been credited with the earliest documented use of the revolutionary method in North America, administered in early 1940 to a schizophrenic female patient in New York City. Soon after, he and colleague Dr. Renato Almansi completed the first case study of ECT to appear in a U.S. publication. Impastato spent the next four decades refining the technique, gaining recognition as one of its most authoritative spokesmen. He taught, lectured widely and published over fifty articles on his work. He called on ECT practitioners to observe the strictest protocols of patient safety, countered resistance to ECT from both the medical and cultural establishments, and met later challenges to electroconvulsive therapy from developments in psychopharmacology. Impastato would live to see ECT recommended by the American Psychiatric Association for a distinct core of intractable mental disorders. The U.S. Food and Drug Administration took longer to respond to the treatment's potential. But in 2016 the FDA drafted guidelines for ECT similar to those of the APA, as well as proposing regulations for treatment with Class II and Class III devices. Though still not free of controversy, electroconvulsive therapy is the treatment of choice for an estimated 100,000 patients a year in the United States.

== Life and works ==
Impastato was born in the Sicilian port town of Mazara del Vallo, the youngest in a family of ten children. In 1912, he emigrated to the United States at the age of nine, settling with his mother Rosaria and a number of his siblings in New York City's "Little Italy." His father Domenico, a schoolteacher, stayed behind in Mazara and died before he was able to join his wife and children in America. Early on it was decided that "Davide" would be the doctor in the family. His mother collected the paychecks of his older brothers and sisters, most of whom worked in New York's garment district, and redistributed the funds to family members according to need. A share of the money was set aside for young David's future education. When the family moved to Brooklyn, he was enrolled at Clason Point Military Academy, run by the Lasallian Christian Brothers, to avoid the uncertainties of the local schools. He went on to receive his pre-medical degree from Columbia University in 1925, and three years later, his Doctor of Medicine from the George Washington University Medical School.

During his general internship at Metropolitan Hospital Center in New York, Impastato was drawn to neurology. In 1929, he began a year of residency at New York's Central Neurological Hospital, followed by two years as clinical attending neurologist at Postgraduate Hospital (later NYU Hospital Center). His presentation of spongioblastoma multiforme of the brain, published in 1932, reflects his neurological foundation. That year he began a residency in Bellevue Hospital's Psychiatric Department, foreshadowing his lifelong interest in the biomedical aspects of human behavior. After his residency, he remained at Bellevue as an assistant psychiatrist, gaining the experience of the city hospital's diverse patient population of "the great, the poor, the wealthy and the unfortunate." During his Bellevue tenure he was also appointed visiting neuropsychiatrist at Columbus Hospital.

In 1937, certified as a Diplomate of the American Board of Psychiatry and Neurology, Impastato established his private practice in Manhattan. The same year, Drs. Ugo Cerletti and Lucio Bini, after experimentation with dogs, administered the first ECT to a catatonic patient in Rome. Though convulsive treatments for mental illness had been conducted earlier with the use of metrazol, this was the first therapeutic seizure in medical history induced by electric current. Impastato was later to describe the event in The American Journal of Psychiatry.

In September 1939, Dr. Renato Almansi, an Italian neuropsychiatrist and future colleague of Impastato's, emigrated to the United States to escape the rising anti-Semitism in Europe. He brought with him a version of the ECT machine that Cerletti and Bini developed for their work in Rome. Soon after arriving in New York, Almansi introduced the Cerletti-Bini device to Impastato, whose growing reputation in America had caught the attention of Dr. E. Secondari, one of Almansi's former psychiatry professors. Impastato had seen the promise of Cerletti's revolutionary technique from the outset. After conducting his own experiments with the device over the next few months, he administered his first electroconvulsive treatment on January 7, 1940, in his West 55th Street office (see "First ECT in America" below).

Almansi had been unable to persuade hospitals in Philadelphia, New York and Boston to sponsor a clinical trial of ECT. Impastato appealed to Columbus Hospital, where he had served in the Department of Neuro-Psychiatry for the prior half-dozen years. Founded by Mother (now Saint) Frances Xavier Cabrini and run by the Missionary Sisters of the Sacred Heart of Jesus, Columbus Hospital might have seemed an unlikely venue for the controversial treatment. But the medical establishment's aversion to controversy weighed less with a small private hospital, and the sisters had long admired Impastato's work with mental sufferers. Rev. Mother Enrica, Mother Superior of the hospital, gave Impastato the go-ahead. He and Almansi began a clinical trial there on February 6, 1940, the earliest ECT treatments reported by any hospital in the United States.

The five-month trial was conducted with male and female patients under the age of fifty. A total of 100 ECT treatments were completed "without a single complication." In September of that year, Impastato and Almansi released the account of their work in the New York State Journal of Medicine, the first case study of the treatment to appear in an American publication. Almansi commented later on the changed environment. "As word spread that the treatment was being administered," he recounted, "others felt encouraged and reassured." Early U.S. practitioners such as Victor Gonda, Douglas Goldman and Lothar Kalinowsky followed the landmark Impastato and Almansi article with their own published studies of ECT. During the war years in the 1940s, electroconvulsive therapy would become a fixture in psychiatric centers in the U.S. and abroad.

Impastato served the war effort as a psychiatric examiner, even as his practice during that period expanded rapidly into large offices on Manhattan's Fifth Avenue and a private out-patient clinic. His clientele ranged from the immigrant population to the city's elite, mirroring his Bellevue experience. He described his therapeutic approach as "eclectic," offering biomedical care as well as psychotherapy and family counselling. "I am not for any one type of treatment," he explained, "I am only for the patient." Emphasizing the humanity of the doctor-patient encounter, he pointed out the "psychic component in any treatment situation, even if the therapy seems to be essentially somatic."

His work with ECT would continue to evolve. He authored more than fifty articles covering a range of subjects from his clinical findings, to historical notes, to his innovations in ECT technology. Impastato supplemented his published work with numerous lectures in the U.S., Europe and Asia, as well as with presentations on radio and television, becoming one of ECT's most respected voices in the international psychiatric community.

His appointments and professional affiliations included: Associate Clinical Professor of Neurology and Psychiatry at New York University School of Medicine; Guest Lecturer in Psychiatry and Law at New York University School of Law; life fellow of the American Psychiatric Association and the New York Academy of Medicine; a founder of the American College of Psychiatrists; founder and first president of the Eastern Psychiatric Research Association; life fellow of the New York Academy of Medicine; member of the Advisory Committee on Malpractice for The Medical Society of New York; life member of the American Association for the Advancement of Science; member of the American Medical Association, the American Society of Medical Psychiatry, the Society of Biological Psychiatry, the New York Neurologic Society, the New York Society for Clinical Psychiatry, and the International League Against Epilepsy; attending psychiatrist and member of the Medical Board of Gracie Square Hospital; consulting or attending neuropsychiatrist at Bellevue (now Bellevue Hospital Center), Columbus Hospital, City Hospital, Parkway Hospital, Goldwater Memorial Hospital (now Coler Specialty Hospital), Kings Park Psychiatric Center and West Hill Sanitarium, all in the New York City area.

== Personal profile ==
Impastato was married to the former Jane Doris Justin, RN, whom he met at Bellevue and who served as his office manager and medical assistant in the first years of practice. They had three children and five grandchildren. He retained close ties with his extended Sicilian-American family, who made his achievements in medicine possible. His "genteel personality and manner," in the words of a contemporary, endeared him to those in both his personal and professional life.

He was a Latinist, a geology hobbyist, a gardener, a stamp and fine-art collector, a member and benefactor of the Salmagundi Art Club of New York (the annual Jane Impastato Award), the founder of Baseball International supporting youth baseball in Italy, a volunteer consultant and forensic psychiatrist for the NYPD, and a weekly house doctor for the Metropolitan Opera. He lived with his wife and children at "Five Acres," the family residence in Pelham Manor, New York.

Impastato's obituary in The New York Times incompletely cited his cause of death as pneumonia. At that time he was hospitalized in Pasadena, California, in the advanced stages of Parkinsonism, which had forced his retirement after nearly fifty years of practice. He is buried at Holy Mount Cemetery, Tuckahoe, New York.

== Legacy ==
The first to administer an electroconvulsive treatment (ECT) for mental illness in North America, Impastato was in the vanguard of pioneering neuroscientists who challenged the medical establishment's resistance to ECT. He also contended with negative representations of the treatment in popular culture such as those in the novel and film One Flew Over the Cuckoo's Nest, which portrayed ECT as a punishment for unruly asylum inmates. By the same token, he confronted his peers with the misapplications of the treatment that contributed to these stereotypes. In bracing articles published in Diseases of the Nervous System, he documented the complications that can result from ECT, including fatality, when treatment protocols are compromised. He reviewed methodologies and called for vigilance. Improper use of ECT could be observed especially in state-hospital settings.

Impastato's concern for the patient also guided his research. Early on he experimented with sodium amytal, a barbiturate derivative acting as an anti-anxiety medication when preparing patients for ECT and helped to reduce the treatment's musculoskeletal complications. This line of investigation led to his breakthrough studies of the succinylcholine, a muscle relaxant, which he presented in over a dozen of his articles and lectures in the early and mid 1950s. Unlike barbiturates that act as depressant, succinylcholine is a neuromuscular blocker, capable of eliminating its convulsive force in the patient while preserving ECT's efficacy. Impastato called it "the miraculous drug." It has since become a procedural standard in the treatment's administration.

By the 1960s, the pharmaceutical treatment of mental illness seemed poised to eclipse ECT entirely. Impastato was among those who affirmed the value of drug therapy for psychiatric disorders. At the same time, he continued to advocate electroconvulsive treatment for cases that proved resistant to pharmaceutical intervention alone. "There is no conflict of interest between drug therapy and the convulsive therapies," he insisted. "Each belongs in the therapy kit of the psychiatrist."

Impastato would live to see the American Psychiatric Association move beyond lingering controversy and adopt this pragmatic approach, recommending ECT in otherwise "untreatable" cases where drugs or psychotherapy remain ineffective. For the APA these include depression with psychotic features, manic delirium, and catatonia when low food or fluid intake threatens the patient's life. The U.S. Food and Drug Administration was slower to back the evidence of favorable ECT outcomes. But in 2016 the agency acknowledged that the benefits of electroconvulsive therapy outweighed the risks, especially to memory which in clinical trials referenced by its Draft Guidelines was shown to "return to baseline" within three moneths after treatment. The FDA responsibly proposed restricting ECT to Class II and Class III devices, the highest level of regulatory control.

Both the APA and FDA guidelines confirm clinical observations dating from Impastato's earliest ECT research. "The most favorable results," he wrote with Almansi in 1940, "have been obtained in cases of recent onset, in catatonic and depressive stupor, and in the group of schizoid-depressives." This seminal appraisal was published within months of Impastato's historic first treatment, which had proceeded without the sanction of his North American peers. Today in the United States, a refined ECT is the frontline therapy for an estimated 100,000 patients a year.

== First ECT in America ==
In his History of the Use of EST in the United States, Impastato describes his first treatment. The procedure takes place after experimentation has been completed and while the search for a hospital venue is underway. Impastato uses the older designation "EST," since at the time the terms "electroshock" and "electrofit" were not yet superseded by the "ECT" acronym for electroconvulsive therapy:

Then in Jan 1940 I was revisited by the father of a schizophrenic patient who, seeing that his [29-year-old] daughter was becoming progressively worse, asked me if there was anything new, any new discovery that might arrest the course of her illness. As he put it, "It doesn't matter to me how dangerous the method might be, even if it should kill her, give it to her for I want her to get well if possible." His saying all this encouraged me to treat her and she became the first patient in the U.S. to receive EST. We gave her the first treatment in my office at 27 W. 55th St. ... We have her chart which I enclose showing the electric parameters we used to give her the first treatment.

Zigmond Lebensohn, MD, provides specifics in his account of the event in Comprehensive Psychiatry:

"Dr Impastato's records reveal the following handwritten entry for January 7, 1940: 'Volts 70, T-.1 sec MA 400. Had delayed (15sec?) reaction during apnea, face flushed, eyes opened, normal expression–looking forward, no breathing.' This treatment was administered by Dr. Impastato on a Sunday morning in his office."

Impastato's 55th Street office also served as his residence, which offered a chance opportunity for Sunday callers. His colleague, Dr. Renato Almansi, was not present during the procedure, arranged spontaneously after the unscheduled visit and the desperate plea of the patient's father. The facilities and patient's records were at hand for her examination and treatment. Impastato's wife Jane, a registered nurse, would have assisted. It was certainly not unlawful for Impastato to proceed with the controversial therapy outside an official clinical setting, but it required a high degree of confidence. Medical institutions on the east coast had so far denied support for ECT research, and he ran the risk of professional censure. Almansi later felt that the human urgency of the circumstances played a large part in the "precipitous" nature of the episode, among the more dramatic in the treatment's history.

The treatment itself matched the initial 70 volts given by Ugo Cerletti in his first ECT three years earlier in Rome. In both Impastato's and Cerletti's patients this voltage elicited a petit mal seizure. Cerletti's patient responded by speaking coherently for the first time in years. Cerletti went on to induce a grand mal seizure in the patient at a higher voltage before concluding the treatment. Impastato's single-stage petit mal procedure required only one assistant besides the operator to ensure patient safety.

Writing in the American Psychiatric Association's newsletter, Psychiatric News, Lucy Ozarin, MD, reviews the competing claims for the first ECT in the United States made by Drs. Douglas Goldman and Victor Gonda. She points out that "none of these claims is supported by historical documentation." By contrast, she cites the "compelling" case made by Impastato's chart for his first ECT patient, dated January 7, 1940, which is on file with his papers in the Library and Archives of the American Psychiatric Association in Arlington, Virginia. She concludes: "In the absence of primary-source evidence to the contrary, or a differing interpolation of Impastato's file, this document would appear to identify the first ECT treatment given to a human subject in the U.S."

== See also ==
- Electroconvulsive therapy
