= Cholinesterase =

Esterase that lyses choline-based esters

Cholinesterase (BChE)

Identifiers
- EC no.: 3.1.1.8
- Alt. names: acylcholine acylhydrolase; benzoylcholinesterase, butylcholinesterase, butyrylcholine esterase, choline esterase II (unspecific), non-specific cholinesterase, pseudocholinesterase (PCE), plasma cholinesterase (PChE), serum cholinesterase (SChE)

Databases
- BRENDA: enzyme data
- ExPASy: NiceZyme view
- KEGG: enzyme entry
- MetaCyc: metabolic pathway
- Rhea: reactions
- PDB structures: RCSB PDB PDBe PDBsum
- Gene Ontology: AmiGO / QuickGO
Search
- PMC: articles
- PubMed: articles
- NCBI: proteins

Acetylcholinesterase (AChE)

Identifiers
- EC no.: 3.1.1.7
- Alt. names: acetylcholine acetylhydrolase; choline esterase I, cholinesterase, true cholinesterase, erythrocyte cholinesterase, RBC cholinesterase

Databases
- BRENDA: enzyme data
- ExPASy: NiceZyme view
- KEGG: enzyme entry
- MetaCyc: metabolic pathway
- Rhea: reactions
- PDB structures: RCSB PDB PDBe PDBsum
- Gene Ontology: AmiGO / QuickGO
Search
- PMC: articles
- PubMed: articles
- NCBI: proteins

The enzyme cholinesterase (EC 3.1.1.8, choline esterase; systematic name acylcholine acylhydrolase) catalyses the hydrolysis of choline-based esters, several of which serve as neurotransmitters:

an acylcholine + H_{2}O = choline + a carboxylate

These reactions are necessary to allow a cholinergic neuron to return to its resting state after activation. For example, in muscle contraction, acetylcholine at a neuromuscular junction triggers a contraction; but for the muscle to relax afterward, rather than remaining locked in a tense state, the acetylcholine must be broken down by a choline esterase.

The Enzyme Commission number 3.1.1.8 describes the butyrylcholinesterase, found mainly in the blood plasma, which has a laxer substrate specificity. In most biochemical discussions, "cholinesterase" refers to both 3.1.1.8 and the acetylcholinesterase, found mainly in chemical synapses and red blood cell membranes, which is specific for the acetyl group.

== Types and nomenclature ==
The two types of cholinesterase in humans are acetylcholinesterase (AChE) and butyrylcholinesterase (BChE). They are named by their respective preferences for substrates; the former hydrolyses acetylcholine more quickly, while the latter hydrolyses butyrylcholine more quickly. The two enzymes are 54% identical to each other in humans, having descended from a common ancestor.

Acetylcholinesterase (AChE) is found primarily on the membranes of red blood cells, in neuromuscular junctions, and in other neural synapses. Acetylcholinesterase exists in multiple molecular forms. In the mammalian brain the majority of AChE occurs as a tetrameric, G4 form (10) with much smaller amounts of a monomeric G1 (4S) form.

Butyrylcholinesterase (BChE) is produced in the liver and found primarily in blood plasma. The butyl and butyryl syllables both refer to butane with one of its terminal methyl groups substituted. The half-life of BChE is approximately 10 to 14 days. BChE levels may be reduced in patients with advanced liver disease. The decrease must be greater than 75% before significant prolongation of neuromuscular blockade occurs with succinylcholine.

Both types are found in the neuromuscular junction. As a result, cholinesterase inhibitors generally work by targeting both enzymes.

== Discovery ==
In 1968, Walo Leuzinger et al. successfully purified and crystallized acetylcholinesterase from electric eels at Columbia University, New York.

The 3D structure of acetylcholinesterase was first determined in 1991 by Joel Sussman et al. using protein from the Pacific electric ray.

Clinically useful quantities of butyrylcholinesterase were synthesized in 2007 by PharmAthene, through the use of genetically modified goats.

== Clinical significance ==
=== AChE ===
The presence of ACHE in the amniotic fluid may be tested in early pregnancy. A sample of amniotic fluid is removed by amniocentesis, and presence of ACHE can confirm several common types of birth defect, including abdominal wall defects and neural tube defects.

The enzyme Acetylcholin esterase, and its inhibition, plays a role in the development of myofascial trigger points and the associated myofascial pain syndrome. By injecting a mouse with acetylcholin esterase inhibitors and electrical stimulation, the muscle develops trigger points.

=== BChE ===
An absence or mutation of the BCHE enzyme leads to a medical condition known as pseudocholinesterase deficiency. This is a silent condition that manifests itself only when people that have the deficiency receive the muscle relaxants succinylcholine or mivacurium during a surgery.

Pseudocholinesterase deficiency may also affect local anaesthetic selection in dental procedures. The enzyme plays an important role in the metabolism of ester-based local anaesthetics, a deficiency lowers the margin of safety and increases the risk of systemic effects with this type of anaesthetic. The selection of an amide-based solution is recommended in such patients.

Elevation of plasma BCHE levels was observed in 90.5% of cases of acute myocardial infarction.

BCHE can be used as a prophylactic agent against nerve gas and other organophosphate poisoning.

Some early research points to genetic butylcholinesterase deficiency as a possible candidate component in sudden infant death syndrome.

== Inhibitors ==
A cholinesterase inhibitor (or "anticholinesterase") suppresses the action of the enzyme. Because of its essential function, chemicals that interfere with the action of cholinesterase are potent neurotoxins, causing excessive salivation and eye-watering in low doses, followed by muscle spasms and ultimately death (examples are some snake venoms, and the nerve gases sarin and VX). One counteracting medication is pralidoxime. The so-called nerve gases and many substances used in insecticides have been shown to act by combining with a residue of serine in the active site of acetylcholine esterase, inhibiting the enzyme completely. The enzyme acetylcholine esterase breaks down the neurotransmitter acetylcholine, which is released at nerve and muscle junctions, in order to allow the muscle or organ to relax. The result of acetylcholine esterase inhibition is that acetylcholine builds up and continues to act so that any nerve impulses are continually transmitted and muscle contractions do not stop.

Among the most common acetylcholinesterase inhibitors are phosphorus-based compounds, which are designed to bind to the active site of the enzyme. The structural requirements are a phosphorus atom bearing two lipophilic groups, a leaving group (such as a halide or thiocyanate), and a terminal oxygen. The entry on Lawesson's reagent has some details on one sub-class of the phosphorus-based compounds.

Some benzodiazepines, e.g., temazepam have an inhibitory effect on cholinesterase.

Cholinesterase levels can be used as an indirect marker of arsenic exposure.

Outside of biochemical warfare, anticholinesterases are also used for reversing medication induced paralysis during anesthesia; as well as in the treatment of myasthenia gravis, glaucoma, and Alzheimer's disease. Such compounds are used for killing insects in a range of products including sheep dip, organophosphate pesticides, and carbamate pesticides. In addition to acute poisoning as described above, a semi-acute poisoning characterized by strong mental disturbances can occur. Also, prolonged exposure can cause birth defects.

== Additional images ==
Acetylcholine

Choline

Acetic acid

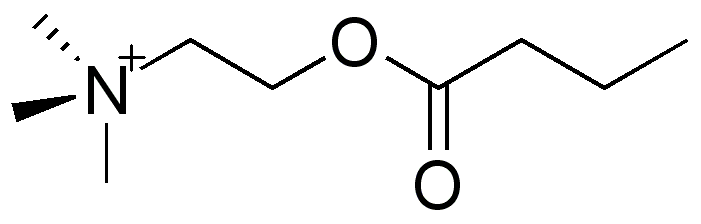
Butyrylcholine
