= C20H29N3O2 =

The molecular formula C_{20}H_{29}N_{3}O_{2} (molar mass: 343.46 g/mol, exact mass: 343.2260 u) may refer to:

- ADBICA (ADB-PICA)
- Cinchocaine
