= C9H20NO2 =

The molecular formula C_{9}H_{20}NO_{2} (molar mass: 174.26 g/mol, exact mass: 174.1494 u) may refer to:

- Muscarine, or L-(+)-muscarine
- Butyrylcholine
