= C9H17NO4 =

The molecular formula C_{9}H_{17}NO_{4} (molar mass: 203.23 g/mol, exact mass: 203.1158 u) may refer to:

- Acetylcarnitine (ALC)
- Succinylmonocholine
- Valiloxybate
