= Butyrylcholinesterase deficiency =

- Specialty: Anesthesia
- Symptoms: Prolonged paralysis
- Complications: Apnea, Sudden cardiac death
- Usual onset: Cocaine use, Administration of plasma cholinesterase metabolized pharmaceuticals
- Types: Homozygous; Heterezygous: Silent, Absent, Fluoride, Dibucaine
- Causes: Autosomal Recessive
- Diagnostic method: Prolonged recovery from paralysis in self or blood relative
- Prevention: Alternative neuromuscular blockade agents, cocaine avoidance
- Treatment: Mechanical ventilation
- Frequency: 1:2000-4000 General Population

Butyrylcholinesterase deficiency (also known as pseudocholinesterase deficiency, and Succinylcholine Sensitivity is an autosomal recessive inherited blood plasma enzyme abnormality in which the body's production of butyrylcholinesterase (BChE) is impaired. People who have this abnormality may be sensitive to certain anesthetic drugs, including the muscle relaxants succinylcholine and mivacurium as well as other ester local anesthetics. It is classed as an inborn error of metabolism in ICD11.

== Signs and symptoms ==
The effects are varied depending on the particular drug given. When anesthetists administer standard doses of these anesthetic drugs to a person with butyrylcholinesterase deficiency, the patient experiences prolonged paralysis of the respiratory muscles, requiring an extended period of time during which the patient must be mechanically ventilated. Eventually the muscle-paralyzing effects of these drugs will wear off despite the deficiency of the pseudocholinesterase enzyme. If the patient is maintained on a mechanical respirator until normal breathing function returns, there is little risk of harm to the patient.

Because it is rare in the general population the deficiency is sometimes overlooked when a patient does not wake up after surgery. If this happens, there are two major complications that can arise. First, the patient may lie awake and paralyzed while medical providers try to determine the cause of the patient's unresponsiveness. Second, the breathing tube may be removed before the patient is strong enough to breathe properly, potentially causing respiratory arrest.

This enzyme abnormality is a benign condition unless a person with burtyrylcholinesterase deficiency is exposed to the offending pharmacological agents.

=== Complications ===
The main complication resulting from butyrylcholinesterase deficiency is the possibility of respiratory failure secondary to succinylcholine or mivacurium-induced neuromuscular paralysis. Individuals may be at increased risk of toxic reactions, including sudden cardiac death, associated with recreational use of the aromatic ester cocaine.

== Genetics ==
The body has two primary ways of metabolizing choline esters. This is via the common, neuronal "acetylcholinesterase" (AChE) and the blood plasma carried "butyrylcholinesterase" (BChE), described here. Several single-nucleotide polymorphisms in the BCHE gene have been identified, such as the D98G missense SNP chr3:165830741 A->G (Asp to Gly at 98) rs1799807 present in 1% of the populace (e.g. dibucaine-resistant "atypical" enzyme at 41% of normal activity), and the A567T missense SNP chr3:165773492 G->A (Ala to Thr at 567) rs1803274 (common K-variant "Kalow" at -7% of normal activity). Many uncommon variants, with greater effects on enzyme activity, are known, such as S1, F1, and F2.

Genes encoding cholinesterase 1 (CHE1) and CHE2 have been mapped to 3q26.1-q26.2. One gene is silent. Specifically there are sixteen possible genotypes, expressed as ten phenotypes; six of these phenotypes are associated with a marked reduction in the hydrolysis of succinylcholine. The plasma cholinesterase activity level is genetically determined by four alleles identified as silent (s), usual allele (u), dibucaine (d), or fluoride (f); also, this allele can be absent (a).

The inherited defect is caused by either the presence of an atypical or complete absence of the enzyme. Cholinesterases are enzymes that facilitate hydrolysis of the esters of choline. Acetylcholine, the most commonly encountered of these esters, is the mediator of the whole cholinergic system. Acetylcholine is immediately inactivated “in situ” by a specific acetylcholinesterase in the ganglia of the autonomic nervous system (preganglionic and postganglionic in the parasympathetic nervous system and almost exclusively preganglionic in the sympathetic nervous system), in the synapses of the central nervous system, and in the neuromuscular junctions. The affinity of BChE is lower for acetylcholine, but higher for other esters of choline, such as butyrylcholine, benzoylcholine, and succinylcholine, and for aromatic esters (e.g., procaine, chloroprocaine, tetracaine). Normally BChE is produced in the liver, has a plasma half-life of 8 to 12 days, and can be found in plasma, erythrocytes, glial tissue, liver, pancreas, and bowel. When succinylcholine is used for anesthesia, its high plasma concentration immediately after intravenous injection decreases rapidly in normal individuals because of the rapid action of plasma BChE. In case of an atypical BChE or complete absence of BChE, the effect of the injected succinylcholine can last for up to 10 hours.

== Drug reactions ==
These patients should notify others in their family who may be at risk for carrying one or more abnormal butyrylcholinesterase gene alleles.

Drugs to avoid:

- Succinylcholine, also known as suxamethonium, which is commonly given to paralyse skeletal muscles as part of a general anaesthetic for surgery. A dose that would paralyze the average individual for 5-10 minutes can paralyze the enzyme-deficient individual for up to 8 hours. If this condition is recognized by the anesthesiologist early, then there is rarely a problem, as the patient can be kept intubated and sedated until the muscle relaxation resolves. If not identified, residual paralysis can cause serious complications due to weakness of the muscles of respiration after the patient's breathing support has been ceased.
- Mivacurium, like succinylcholine, is a muscle relaxant and will have prolonged action in those with butyrylcholinesterase deficiency.
- Pilocarpine (trade name Salagen) is used to treat dry mouth. As the name suggests, dry mouth is a medical condition that occurs when saliva production goes down. There are a variety of causes of dry mouth including side effect of various drugs.
- Butyrylcholine - this is rarely used to treat exposure to nerve agents, pesticides, toxins, etc.
- Drugs containing Huperzine A and Donepezil, which are used to slow the progression of Alzheimer's disease.
- Drugs containing propionylcholine and acetylcholine
- Parathion, an agricultural pesticide
- Procaine, a local anaesthetic agent used before and during various surgical or dental procedures. Procaine causes loss of feeling in the skin and surrounding tissues.

== Diagnosis ==
This inherited condition can be diagnosed with a blood test. If the total cholinesterase activity in the patient's blood is low, this may suggest an atypical form of the enzyme is present, putting the patient at risk of sensitivity to suxamethonium and related drugs. Inhibition studies may also be performed to give more information about potential risk. In some cases, genetic studies may be carried out to help identify the form of the enzyme that is present.

== Prevention ==
Patients with known butyrylcholinesterase deficiency may wear a medic-alert bracelet that will notify healthcare workers of increased risk from administration of succinylcholine, and use a non-depolarising neuromuscular-blocking drug for general anesthesia, such as rocuronium.

== Prognosis ==
Prognosis for recovery following administration of succinylcholine is excellent when medical support includes close monitoring and respiratory support measures.

In nonmedical settings in which subjects with butyrylcholinesterase deficiency are exposed to cocaine, sudden cardiac death can occur.

== Frequency ==
For homozygosity, the incidence is approximately 1:2,000-4,000, whereas the incidence for heterozygosity increases to up to 1:500. The variant EaEa genotype, homozygous absent, is approximately 1:3200. The gene for the dibucaine-resistant atypical cholinesterase appears to be widely distributed. Among Caucasians, males are affected almost twice as often as females. The frequency for heterozygosity is low among black people, Japanese and non-Japanese Asians, South Americans, Australian Aboriginal peoples, and Arctic Inuit (in general). However, there are a few Inuit populations (e.g., Alaskan Inuit) with an unusually high gene frequency for BChE deficiency. A relatively high frequency also was reported among Jews from Iran and Iraq, Caucasians from North America, Great Britain, Portugal, Yugoslavia, and Greece.

=== Arya Vysyas ===
Multiple studies done both in and outside India have shown an increased prevalence of pseudocholinesterase deficiency amongst the Arya Vysya community. A study performed in the Indian state of Tamil Nadu in Coimbatore on 22 men and women from this community showed that 9 of them had butyrylcholinesterase deficiency, which translates to a prevalence that is 4000-fold higher than that in European and American populations.

=== Persian Jews ===
Butyrylcholinesterase deficiency is common within the Persian and Iraqi Jewish populations. Approximately one in 10 Persian Jews are known to have a mutation in the gene causing this disorder and thus one in 100 couples will both carry the mutant gene and each of their children will have a 25% chance of having two mutant genes, and thus be affected with this disorder. This means that one out of 400 Persian Jews is affected with this condition.
