= Proctosedyl =

Brand of pharmaceuticals

Proctosedyl is the brand name for a family of two products with identical active ingredients designed to treat a variety of proctological disorders. One is a topical ointment, the other a rectal suppository. In the United Kingdom both products are contract manufactured by Patheon Limited on behalf of the Sanofi-Aventis group. Manufacture and distribution is provided by Sanofi Aventis subsidiaries Hoechst and Hoechst Marion Roussel in other territories worldwide.

== Application ==
Both the yellowish-white, translucent, greasy ointment and the smooth, off-white suppositories are formulated for the relief of chronic pruritus ani (otherwise known anal itching or anusitis) and the treatment of pain, irritation, discharge and itching associated with haemorrhoids (otherwise known as piles). However both products are also used to provide pain relief in the treatment of anal fissure, for patients undergoing haemorrhoidectomy, (pre and post-operative), in the relief of post-partum (otherwise known as post-natal) haemorrhoidal conditions, and in the treatment of non-infective proctitis.

== Active ingredients ==
Both preparations contain:

- Cinchocaine hydrochloride at a concentration of 5 mg/g to provide anaesthesia, analgesia and to act as a spasmolytic.
- Hydrocortisone at a concentration of 5 mg/g. to provide antipruritic and anti-inflammatory relief

Preparations in some territories may also contain:

- Framycetin sulfate at a concentration of 10 mg/g as an antibacterial agent.
- Aesculin at a concentration of 10 mg/g for its retardant effect on Escherichia coli (otherwise known as E. Coli).
