= Alan J. Russell =

Alan J. Russell (born August 8, 1962) is an English engineer who is Vice President of Large Molecule Discovery & Research Data Science for Amgen. He also leads Technology & Innovation for R&D.

Until 2020, Russell was the Highmark Distinguished Career Professor and Director of the Disruptive Health Technology Institute at Carnegie Mellon University. From 2013 through spring of 2016 he was also the Chief Innovation Officer, Allegheny Health Network.

He is married to Maria Caruso and has five children.

== Education ==
Russell earned his bachelor's degree in Biochemistry and Applied Molecular Biology from the University of Manchester Institute of Science and Technology in 1984, graduating with Honors, First Class. In 1987, he completed his Ph.D. in Biological Chemistry from the Imperial College of Science and Technology, University of London. Russell also served as a NATO Research Fellow in Chemistry at MIT (Massachusetts Institute of Technology) from 1987-1989.

== Research ==
Russell's initial research centered on enzymes and, from that study, Russell and his team described the first use of enzymes in ionic liquids. In addition, the team was the first to describe the use of pressure to control enzyme activity in supercritical fluids, the first stabilization of enzymes for chemical weapon defense and the first use of ATRP to grow polymers from the surface of proteins. Russell also discovered a route to stabilize enzymes by multipoint attachment to polyurethane foams.

His research into ruggedizing enzymes has led to the development of polymer-based protein engineering using ATRP. Russell’s enzyme stabilization technology was singled out for the U.S. Army's Top Ten Greatest Invention Award, and products containing the core chemistry (such as the Agentase Chemical Agent Detection Kit) are now used to monitor activities in countries suspected of developing and using chemical weapons.

Russell's expertise in regenerative medicine led to an invitation to speak at TED2006. There, Dr. Russell spoke on the potential of regenerative medicine to engineer new tissue and organs to replace sick ones.

== Career ==
In 1989, Russell joined the faculty of the Department of Chemical Engineering at the University of Pittsburgh as an assistant professor. Promoted to Associate Professor in 1993, Dr. Russell then went on in 1995 to serve as the Chairman of the Department of Chemical and Petroleum Engineering at the university.

In 1999, Russell became the Founding President of the Tissue Engineering and Regenerative Medicine International Society.

In 2001, Russell joined the McGowan Institute for Regenerative Medicine as its founding director. In 2012 Russell joined Carnegie Mellon University as the Highmark Distinguished Career Professor in the Department of Biomedical Engineering, as well as, the founding director of the Disruptive Health Technology Institute or DHTI. DHTI is focused on transformational improvements in the affordability, accessibility, quality, and simplicity of health care solutions. Also in 2012 Russell served as Chair of the College of Fellows for the American Institute for Medical and Biological Engineering.

Russell is Vice President of Research, Large Molecule Discovery and Head of R&D Technology & Innovation at Amgen Inc. His work focuses on maintaining a diverse pipeline of biologic drug candidates and advancing next-generation approaches to biologics discovery and development. He also serves on the Board of Trustees of the Gordon Research Conferences, which supports international scientific collaboration across disciplines.

=== Selected works ===
Russell is the author of over 200 published works (h-index 62/i10-index 124).

- Campbell, Alan S.; Jose, Moncy V.; Marx, Sharon; Cornelius, Steven; Koepsel, Richard R.; Islam, Mohammad F.; Russell, Alan J. (2016). "Improved power density of an enzymatic biofuel cell with fibrous supports of high curvature". RSC Advances. 6 (12): 10150–10158. Bibcode:2016RSCAd...610150C. doi:10.1039/C5RA25895B.
- Campbell, Alan S.; Jeong, Yeon Joo; Geier, Steven M.; Koepsel, Richard R.; Russell, Alan J.; Islam, Mohammad F. (2015). "Membrane/Mediator-Free Rechargeable Enzymatic Biofuel Cell Utilizing Graphene/Single-Wall Carbon Nanotube Cogel Electrodes". ACS Applied Materials & Interfaces. 7 (7): 4056–4065. doi:10.1021/am507801x. PMID 25643030.<
- Murata, Hironobu; Cummings, Chad S.; Koepsel, Richard R.; Russell, Alan J. (2014). "Rational Tailoring of Substrate and Inhibitor Affinity via ATRP Polymer-Based Protein Engineering". Biomacromolecules. 15 (7): 2817–2823. doi:10.1021/bm5008629. PMID 24954523.
- "Creating a team to navigate the modern health care environment". Orthopedics Today. September 2014.
- d'Souza, Sonia; Murata, Hironobu; Jose, Moncy V.; Askarova, Sholpan; Yantsen, Yuliya; Andersen, Jill D.; Edington, Collin D.J.; Clafshenkel, William P.; Koepsel, Richard R.; Russell, Alan J. (2014). "Engineering of cell membranes with a bisphosphonate-containing polymer using ATRP synthesis for bone targeting". Biomaterials. 35 (35): 9447–9458. doi:10.1016/j.biomaterials.2014.07.041. PMID 25150889.
- Marhefka, Joie N.; Moon-Massat, Paula F.; Dubé, Gregory P.; Light, William R.; Freilich, Daniel A.; Russell, Alan J.; Kameneva, Marina V. (2014). "Blood soluble polymers for enhancing near-vessel-wall RBC traffic in presence of hemoglobin based oxygen carrier". International Journal of Engineering Science. 83: 138–145. doi:10.1016/j.ijengsci.2014.04.012.
- He, Hongkun; Adzima, Brian; Zhong, Mingjiang; Averick, Saadyah; Koepsel, Richard; Murata, Hironobu; Russell, Alan; Luebke, David; Takahara, Atsushi; Nulwala, Hunaid; Matyjaszewski, Krzysztof (2014). "Multifunctional photo-crosslinked polymeric ionic hydrogel films". Polymer Chemistry. 5 (8): 2824. doi:10.1039/C3PY01708G.
- Russell, Alan J. (2014). "The end of the beginning for tissue engineering". The Lancet. 383 (9913): 193–195. doi:10.1016/S0140-6736(13)62110-8. PMID 24161822. S2CID 5756122.
- Cummings, Chad; Murata, Hironobu; Koepsel, Richard; Russell, Alan J. (2014). "Dramatically Increased pH and Temperature Stability of Chymotrypsin Using Dual Block Polymer-Based Protein Engineering". Biomacromolecules. 15 (3): 763–771. doi:10.1021/bm401575k. PMID 24506329.
- Cummings, Chad; Murata, Hironobu; Koepsel, Richard; Russell, Alan J. (2013). "Tailoring enzyme activity and stability using polymer-based protein engineering". Biomaterials. 34 (30): 7437–7443. doi:10.1016/j.biomaterials.2013.06.027. PMID 23849877.

== Patents ==
Russell’s work has led to the awarding of over 20 patents such as:

- J. Huang, A.J. Russell, N.V. Tsarevsky and K. Matyjaszewski. Modification of Surfaces with Polymers, US Patent 8349410, (2013)
- R.R. Koepsel, G. Amitai, A.J. Russell and H. Murata. Decontamination of Chemical and Biological Agents, US Patent Application 13/406,508, (2012)
- A.J. Russell and S.B. Lee. End-to-End Joining of Nanotubes, US Patent 8012278, (2011)
- W.J. Federspiel, A.J. Russell, H.I. Oh and J.L. Kaar. Carbon Dioxide Removal from e.g. Blood using Membrane and Immobilized Carbonic Anhydrase; Artificial Lung for Example, US Patent 7763097, (2010)
- A.J. Russell, R.R. Koepsel and S.B. Lee. Self-assembled nanostructures and methods for preparing the same, US Patent 7666911, (2010)

== Honors ==
- Elected Fellow of the American Institute for Medical and Biological Engineers (1998)
- PBT Fastracker Award (2004)
- Ten Greatest Army Inventions (2004)
- Rolling Stone 100 (#32 in Top 100 People who will change America) (2009)
- TERMIS Lifetime Achievement Award (2012)
- ESWP President’s Award for Engineering Excellence (2014)
