= Polymer sponge =

Taking clues from spongy toddler toys that can absorb water and inflate to bigger sizes, scientists at Mayo Clinical Research Centre, Rochester, Minnesota, United States have developed biodegradable polymer grafts that, when surgically placed in damaged vertebrae, intended to grow such that it is just the right size and shape to fix the spinal column.

For obvious reasons, any problem with the backbone of a vertebrate is often considered a potential disability which can limit a person's ability to manoeuvre their way around their surroundings, cause a lot of pain and be responsible for mental distress. This has been researched upon by Lichun Lu and Xifeng Liu, scientists from Mayo Clinic's college of medicine, who have developed a novel spinal graft that, once surgically placed in the body, will grow to be just the right size and shape to fix the spinal column. They presented their work at the 251st National Meeting & Exposition of the non-profit organization American Chemical Society (ACS).

== Problem ==
Current treatments for spinal tumours have been considered way too expensive and invasive. When cancer metastasizes it predominantly tends to settle in the spinal column. A different approach to replacing harmed vertebrae has been investigated. Polymer sponge researchers were reported to being about to present their work in March 2016 to a meeting of the American Chemical Society (ACS).

== Solution ==
Doctors can cut out the infected bone tissue (or flat-out replace it as they did in the Sydney case) but that leaves large gaps in the spine. Normally, doctors would either have to open the chest cavity and access the spine from far side (which entails a lengthy recovery and high probability of complications) or they'd make a small incision in the neck/back and inject expandable titanium rods into the bone gap (which is super expensive because titanium). This new technique combines the easy access and short recovery of the titanium rod method with the low cost of the open chest operation. The use of sponges for the treatment of such problems has long been suggested for obvious reasons.

== Procedure ==
Doctors simply cut a small hole in the patient's neck/back and inject a hydrogel polymer into the bone gap much the same way they would a titanium rod. This polymer absorbs fluids from within the wound and grows to fill the gap. Doctors control how far the polymer expands in any specific direction by first inserting a "cage"—basically a pre-expanded shell that the polymer fills in as it spreads. Think of it as the wooden frame that keeps a freshly-poured concrete sidewalk in place until it hardens. Once the polymer fills in the cage, which takes 5 to 10 minutes on average, it will set and harden into a viable prosthetic. From there, surrounding bone tissue grows into and through the polymer, reinforcing and cementing it in place.

== Process ==
The sponge-like polymer, polycaprolactone (PCL) shows promise as a medical material that can be used to fill gaps in human bones and serve as a scaffold to promote new bone growth. Injuries, birth defects (such as cleft lip and palates), or the removal of tumors in the case of bone cancer can create gaps in bone that are too large to heal naturally. The gaps may dramatically alter a person's phenotypic appearance when they occur in the head, face, or jaw.

== Transplant rejection ==
While there might be a strong possibility that a transplant is rejected, various complications may be averted by the use of techniques like bone marrow transplantation, blood transfusion, T lymphocyte modification and the similar techniques.

The scope of polymer sponge in this field is still in its infancy and researchers in the field of biotechnological applications for making the concept available to humans and animals may require more attentive financing.

== See also ==
- Sponge (animal)
- Sponge (material)
- Transplant rejection
- Vertebral column
- Vertebrates
