= Butyrylcholinesterase =

Mammalian protein found in humans

BCHE
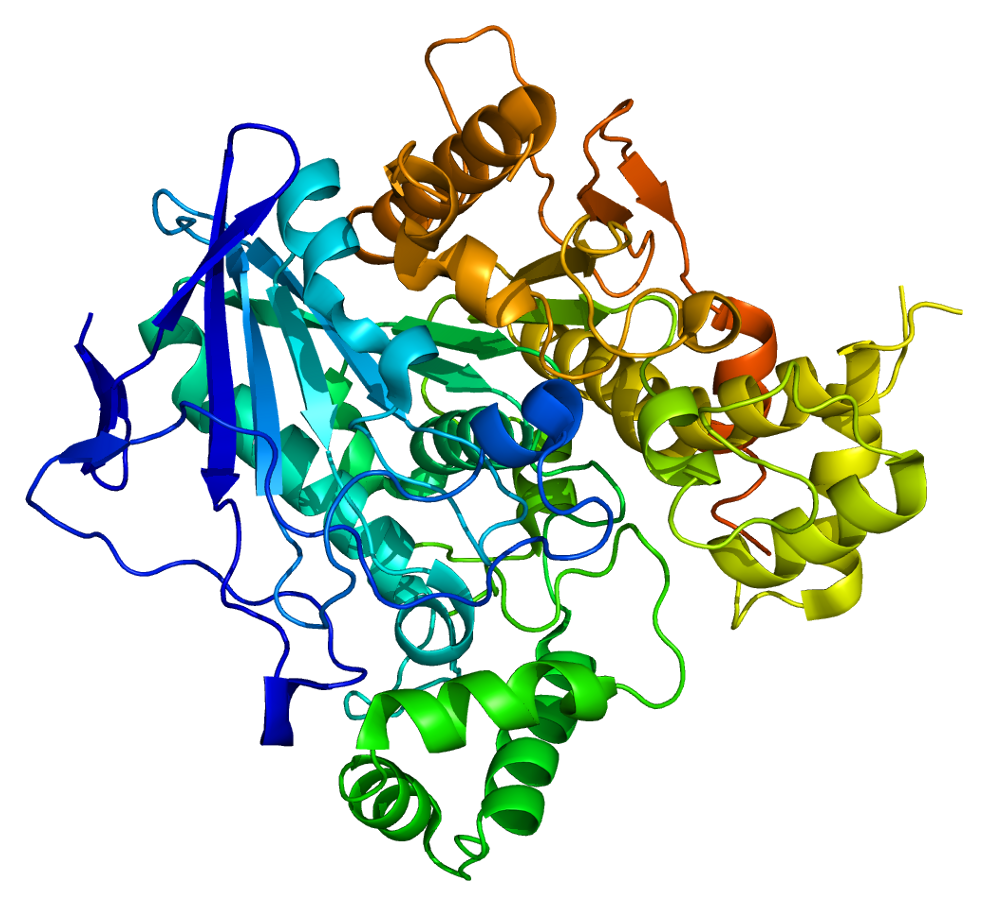

Identifiers
- Aliases: BCHE, CHE1, CHE2, E1, butyrylcholinesterase, BCHED
- External IDs: OMIM: 177400; MGI: 894278; GeneCards: BCHE
Available structures
PDB	Ortholog search: PDBe RCSB
PDB	List of PDB id codes 1P0P, 4AXB, 4B0P, 2XQG, 1XLV, 2WIK, 2WIL, 1P0Q, 1XLU, 4BDS, 2XQF, 2PM8, 2XQK, 4AQD, 4BBZ, 2WID, 2XMB, 1XLW, 2XMC, 4TPK, 2XMG, 2XMD, 3DKK, 3O9M, 2WSL, 2WIJ, 1P0I, 2WIG, 2XQJ, 3DJY, 1P0M, 4B0O, 2XQI, 2Y1K, 4XII, 2WIF, 2J4C
Enzyme activity
EC #	BRENDA	ExPASy	KEGG	MetaCyc
3.1.1.8	↗	↗	↗	↗

Gene location (Human)
Chr.	Chromosome 3 (human)
Band	3q26.1	Start	165,772,904 bp
Band	3q26.1	End	165,837,462 bp

Gene location (Mouse)
Chr.	Chromosome 3 (mouse)
Band	3|3 E3	Start	73,543,141 bp
Band	3|3 E3	End	73,615,748 bp
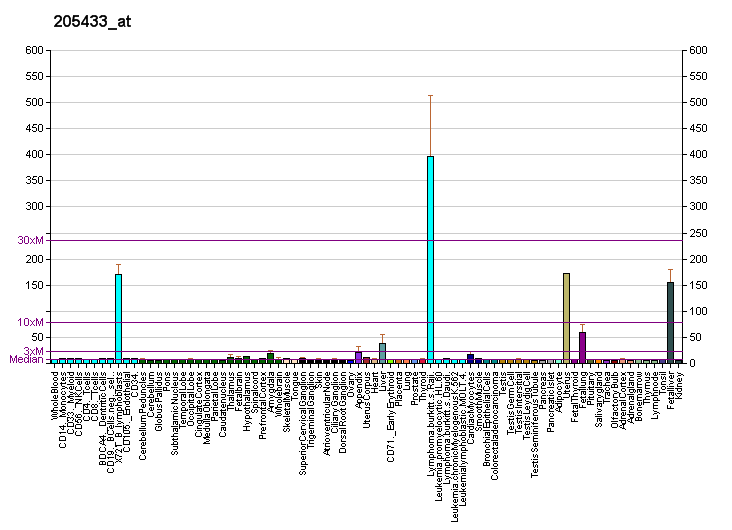
RNA expression pattern
Bgee	Human / Mouse (ortholog); Top expressed in: parietal pleura; right lobe of liver; germinal epithelium; left uterine tube; muscle layer of sigmoid colon; pericardium; seminal vesicula; visceral pleura; ventricular zone; body of uterus / Top expressed in: duodenum; left lobe of liver; ascending aorta; white adipose tissue; atrium; brown adipose tissue; intercostal muscle; epithelium of stomach; jejunum; lumbar spinal ganglion; More reference expression data
BioGPS	More reference expression data
Gene ontology
Molecular function	carboxylic ester hydrolase activity; amyloid-beta binding; cholinesterase activity; choline binding; catalytic activity; identical protein binding; acetylcholinesterase activity; enzyme binding; hydrolase activity; hydrolase activity, acting on ester bonds
Cellular component	endoplasmic reticulum lumen; blood microparticle; membrane; extracellular region; endoplasmic reticulum; nuclear envelope lumen; extracellular space
Biological process	choline metabolic process; response to nutrient; neuroblast differentiation; response to glucocorticoid; negative regulation of synaptic transmission; learning; cocaine metabolic process; response to alkaloid; response to folic acid; negative regulation of cell population proliferation
Sources:Amigo / QuickGO
Orthologs
Databases	NCBI: entry; OMA: entry
Species	Human	Mouse
Entrez	590	12038
Ensembl	ENSG00000114200	ENSMUSG00000027792
UniProt	P06276	Q03311
RefSeq (mRNA)	NM_000055	NM_009738
RefSeq (protein)	NP_000046	NP_033868
Location (UCSC)	Chr 3: 165.77 – 165.84 Mb	Chr 3: 73.54 – 73.62 Mb
PubMed search
- Wikidata
View/Edit Human	View/Edit Mouse

Butyrylcholinesterase (HGNC symbol BCHE; EC 3.1.1.8), also known as BChE, BuChE, BuChase, pseudocholinesterase, or plasma (cholin)esterase, is a nonspecific cholinesterase, an enzyme that hydrolyses many different choline-based esters. In humans, it is made in the liver and found mainly in blood plasma. It is encoded by the BCHE gene.

It is very similar to the neuronal acetylcholinesterase, which is also known as RBC or "erythrocyte cholinesterase". The term "serum cholinesterase" is generally used in reference to a clinical test that reflects levels of both of these enzymes in the blood. Assay of butyrylcholinesterase activity in plasma can be used as a liver function test, due to the fact that both hypercholinesterasemia and hypocholinesterasemia indicate pathological processes. The half-life of BCHE is approximately 10 to 14 days.

Butyrylcholine is a synthetic compound that does not occur in the body naturally. It is used in the laboratory to distinguish between acetylcholinesterase and butyrylcholinesterase.

== Potential physiological role ==
Butyrylcholinesterase may be a physiological ghrelin regulator.

== Clinical significance ==
Pseudocholinesterase deficiency results in delayed metabolism of only a few compounds of clinical significance, including the following: succinylcholine, mivacurium, procaine, heroin, and cocaine. Of these, its most clinically important substrate is the depolarizing neuromuscular blocking agent, succinylcholine, which the pseudocholinesterase enzyme hydrolyzes to succinylmonocholine and then to succinic acid.

In individuals with normal plasma levels of normally functioning pseudocholinesterase enzyme, hydrolysis and inactivation of approximately 90–95% of an intravenous dose of succinylcholine occurs before it reaches the neuromuscular junction. The remaining 5–10% of the succinylcholine dose acts as an acetylcholine receptor agonist at the neuromuscular junction, causing prolonged depolarization of the postsynaptic junction of the motor-end plate. This depolarization initially triggers fasciculation of skeletal muscle. As a result of prolonged depolarization, endogenous acetylcholine released from the presynaptic membrane of the motor neuron does not produce any additional change in membrane potential after binding to its receptor on the myocyte. Flaccid paralysis of skeletal muscles develops within one minute. In normal subjects, skeletal muscle function returns to normal approximately five minutes after a single bolus injection of succinylcholine as it passively diffuses away from the neuromuscular junction. Pseudocholinesterase deficiency can result in higher levels of intact succinylcholine molecules reaching receptors in the neuromuscular junction, causing the duration of paralytic effect to continue for as long as eight hours. This condition is recognized clinically when paralysis of the respiratory and other skeletal muscles fails to spontaneously resolve after succinylcholine is administered as an adjunctive paralytic agent during anesthesia procedures. In such cases respiratory assistance is required.

Mutant alleles at the BCHE locus are responsible for suxamethonium sensitivity. Homozygous persons sustain prolonged apnea after administration of the muscle relaxant suxamethonium in connection with surgical anesthesia. The activity of pseudocholinesterase in the serum is low and its substrate behavior is atypical. In the absence of the relaxant, the homozygote is at no known disadvantage.

Finally, pseudocholinesterase metabolism of procaine results in formation of paraaminobenzoic acid (PABA). If the patient receiving procaine is on sulfonamide antibiotics such as bactrim the antibiotic effect will be antagonized by providing a new source of PABA to the microbe for subsequent synthesis of folic acid.

=== Marker for risk of SIDS ===
Research published by the SIDS and Sleep Apnoea Research Group of The Children's Hospital in Westmead, New South Wales, Australia, in the May 6, 2022 edition of in The Lancet indicates that BChE may be a marker for babies that are at risk of sudden infant death syndrome (SIDS). That is, lower levels of BChE were associated with an increased risk of SIDS.

== Medical uses ==
=== Prophylactic countermeasure against nerve agents ===
Butyrylcholinesterase is a prophylactic countermeasure against organophosphate nerve agents. It binds nerve agent in the bloodstream before it can exert effects in the nervous system. Because it is a biological scavenger (and universal target), it is currently the only therapeutic agent effective in providing complete stoichiometric protection against the entire spectrum of organophosphate nerve agents.

=== Prophylactic against cocaine addiction ===
An experimental new drug was developed for the potential treatment of cocaine abuse and overdose based on the pseudocholinesterase structure (it was a human BChE mutant with improved catalytic efficiency). It was shown to remove cocaine from the body 2000 times as fast as the natural form of BChE. Studies in rats have shown that the drug prevented convulsions and death when administered cocaine overdoses.

Transplantation of skin cells modified to express the enhanced form of butyrylcholinesterase into mice enables the long-term release of the enzyme and efficiently protects the mice from cocaine-seeking behavior and cocaine overdose.

== Interactive pathway map ==
Click on genes, proteins and metabolites below to link to respective articles. (Note: The interactive pathway map can be edited at WikiPathways: "IrinotecanPathway_WP229".)

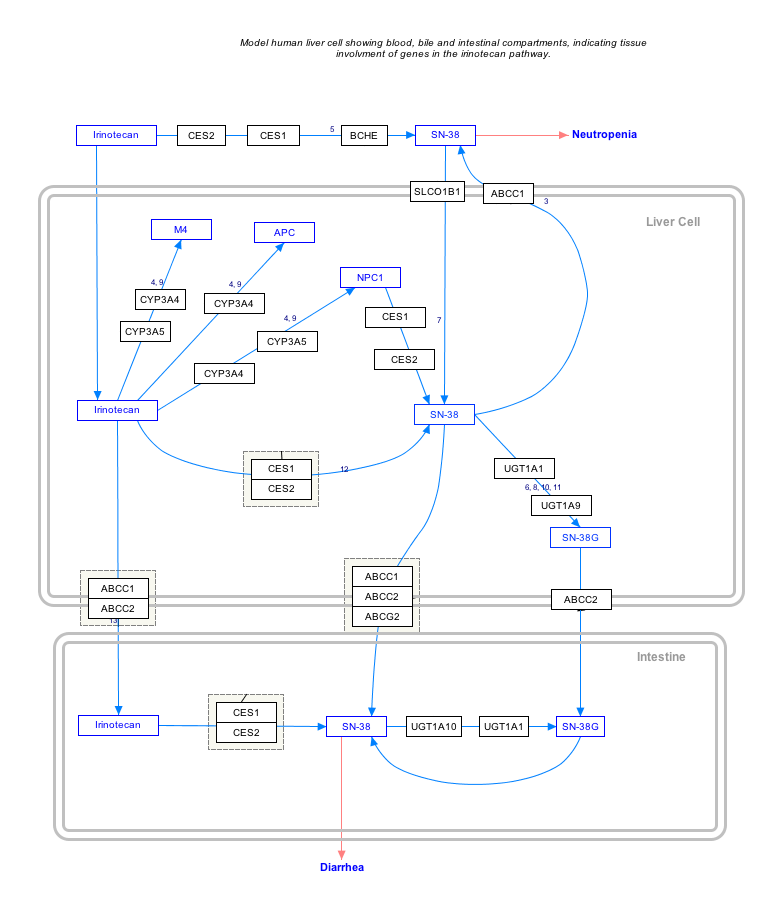

Irinotecan Pathway edit

== Inhibitors ==
- Phytocannabinoids
  - Cannabidiol
  - Δ8-tetrahydrocannabinol
  - Cannabigerol
  - Cannabigerolic acid
  - Cannabicitran
  - Cannabidivarin
  - Cannabichromene
  - Cannabinol
- Cymserine and derivatives
- Profenamine
- Rivastigmine
- Tacrine
- (+)-ZINC-12613047: IC_{50} human BChE 13nM, high selectivity over AChE.
- Hybrid/bitopic ligands

== Nomenclature ==
The nomenclatural variations of BCHE and of cholinesterases generally are discussed at Cholinesterase § Types and nomenclature.

== See also ==
- Cholinesterases
- Dibucaine number
