= Succinylmonocholine =

Names
- Preferred IUPAC name 2-[(3-Carboxypropanoyl)oxy]-N,N,N-trimethylethan-1-aminium

Identifiers
CAS Number	5518-77-4
3D model (JSmol)	Interactive image
ChemSpider	141273
MeSH	Succinylmonocholine
PubChem CID	160784
UNII	FU8UCR633Q
CompTox Dashboard (EPA)	DTXSID30203683
- InChI: InChI=1S/C9H17NO4/c1-10(2,3)6-7-14-9(13)5-4-8(11)12/h4-7H2,1-3H3/p+1 Key: JQLBLDAELQDYMK-UHFFFAOYSA-O; InChI=1/C9H17NO4/c1-10(2,3)6-7-14-9(13)5-4-8(11)12/h4-7H2,1-3H3/p+1 Key: JQLBLDAELQDYMK-IKLDFBCSAY
- SMILES: O=C(O)CCC(=O)OCC[N+](C)(C)C

Properties
Chemical formula	C_{9}H_{18}NO_{4}^{+}
Molar mass	204.244 g/mol
- Except where otherwise noted, data are given for materials in their standard state (at 25 °C [77 °F], 100 kPa). verify (what is ?) Infobox references

Succinylmonocholine is an ester of succinic acid and choline created by the metabolism of suxamethonium chloride.

== See also ==
- Succinic acid
- Choline
