= Cinchocaine =

Local anaesthetic drug

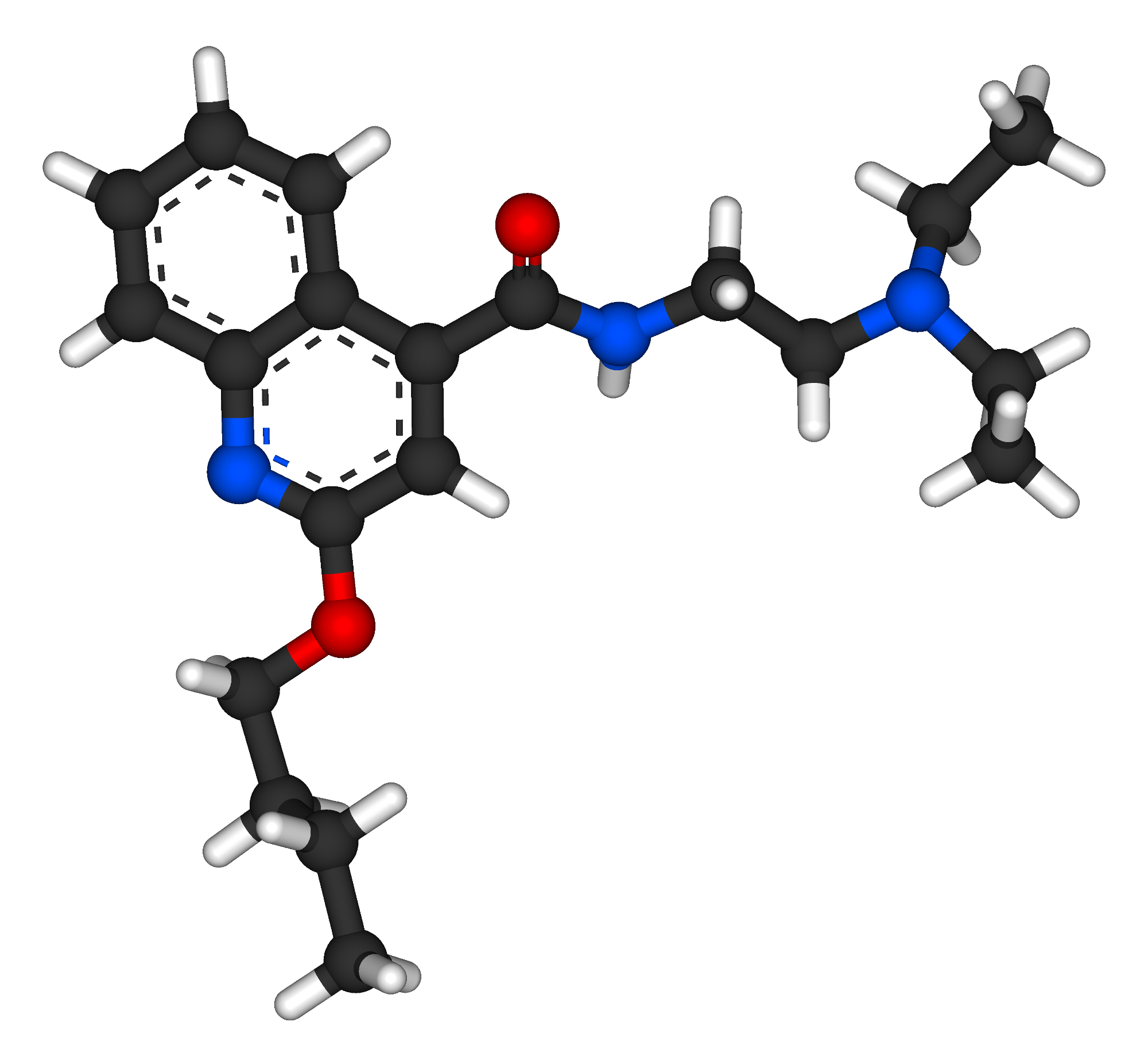

Clinical data
- AHFS/Drugs.com: International Drug Names
- Routes of administration: topical, intravenous (for animal euthanasia)
- ATC code: C05AD04 (WHO) D04AB02 (WHO) N01BB06 (WHO) S01HA06 (WHO) S02DA04 (WHO)

Legal status
- Legal status: US: OTC

Identifiers
- IUPAC name: 2-butoxy-N-[2-(diethylamino)ethyl]quinoline-4-carboxamide
- CAS Number: 85-79-0
- PubChem CID: 3025
- IUPHAR/BPS: 7159
- DrugBank: DB00527
- ChemSpider: 2917
- UNII: L6JW2TJG99
- KEGG: D00733
- ChEBI: CHEBI:247956
- ChEMBL: ChEMBL1086
- CompTox Dashboard (EPA): DTXSID3045271
- ECHA InfoCard: 100.001.484

Chemical and physical data
- Formula: C_{20}H_{29}N_{3}O_{2}
- Molar mass: 343.471 g·mol^{−1}
- 3D model (JSmol): Interactive image
- SMILES: O=C(c1c2ccccc2nc(OCCCC)c1)NCCN(CC)CC
- InChI: InChI=1S/C20H29N3O2/c1-4-7-14-25-19-15-17(16-10-8-9-11-18(16)22-19)20(24)21-12-13-23(5-2)6-3/h8-11,15H,4-7,12-14H2,1-3H3,(H,21,24); Key:PUFQVTATUTYEAL-UHFFFAOYSA-N

Cinchocaine (INN/BAN) or dibucaine (USAN) is an amide local anesthetic. Among the most potent and toxic of the long-acting local anesthetics, current use of cinchocaine is generally restricted to spinal and topical anesthesia. It is sold under the brand names Cincain, Nupercainal, Nupercaine and Sovcaine.

== Medical use ==
Cinchocaine is the active ingredient in some topical hemorrhoid creams such as Proctosedyl. It is also a component of the veterinary drug Somulose, used for euthanasia of horses and cattle.

== Physical properties ==
Cinchocaine is relatively insoluble in alkaline aqueous solutions.

== See also ==
- Dibucaine number
