= Miller's Anesthesia =

Anesthesiology Textbook

Miller's Anesthesia is an authoritative textbook on anesthesiology.

== History ==
First published in 1981 by Churchill Livingstone, it was originally catered to an American audience due to technical differences in anesthesia procedures among European and American practitioners. The first edition was co-authored by many contributors at the University of California. The book soon became a huge success, and it was frequently cited by research groups and clinical departments across the United States.

The second edition appeared in 1986, with total content filling more than 2400 pages spread over three separate volumes. Although it was criticized for lack of cross-referencing and noticeable differences in writing styles due to a higher number of contributors, Miller's Anesthesia soon became the "standard encyclopedic textbook of anesthesia". In 1991, the third edition was released in two volumes with the involvement of more international contributors. The sixth edition was noted for its illustrations of technical procedures such as ultrasound-guided peripheral venous access, caudal block in pediatric populations and anesthesia for robot-assisted surgery. New video segments were created for the accompanying CD demonstrations of techniques such as tracheal intubation and needle cricothyrotomy. In 2010, the seventh edition was released with a downloadable video library for extra anesthesia procedures.

In 2015, the eighth edition was released with more than 3200 pages in two volumes and nine main sections. Major updates include ten new chapters covering robot-administered anesthesia, non-operating room anesthesia, non-opioid analgesics, and anesthetic neurotoxicity.

The American Society of Anesthesiologists has recommended Miller's Anesthesia as an essential textbook for preparations for a career in anesthesiology.

== Companion texts ==
- Miller's Anesthesia Review
- Anesthetic Pharmacology: Physiologic Principles and Clinical Practice
