= Lucio Bini =

Italian psychiatrist and professor (1908-1964)

- Born: 1908
- Died: 1964 (aged 55–56)
- Occupations: Psychiatrist, professor

Lucio Bini (18 September 1908 – 15 August 1964) was an Italian psychiatrist and professor at the University of Rome La Sapienza, Italy. Together with Ugo Cerletti, a neurophysiologist and a psychiatrist, he researched and discovered the method of electroconvulsive therapy, a type of shock therapy for mental diseases. He is regarded as the technical and physiological architect of electroconvulsive therapy, designing the original Cerletti–Bini apparatus used to induce therapeutic seizures in patients with psychotic disorders in 1938–1939.
