= Mivacurium chloride =

Drug used in a hospital setting

Clinical data
- Trade names: Mivacron
- Other names: bis[3-[6,7-dimethoxy-2-methyl-1-[(3,4,5-trimethoxyphenyl)methyl]-3,4-dihydro-1H-isoquinolin-2-yl]propyl] oct-4-enedioate
- AHFS/Drugs.com: International Drug Names
- Routes of administration: IV
- ATC code: M03AC10 (WHO)

Legal status
- Legal status: In general: ℞ (Prescription only)

Pharmacokinetic data
- Bioavailability: 100% (IV)
- Metabolism: ester hydrolysis by plasma cholinesterases

Identifiers
- IUPAC name: (1R,1'R)-2,2'-[[(4E)-1,8-dioxooct-4-ene-1,8-diyl]bis(oxypropane-3,1-diyl)]bis[6,7-dimethoxy-2-methyl-1-(3,4,5-trimethoxybenzyl)-1,2,3,4-tetrahydroisoquinolinium]
- CAS Number: 106861-44-3
- PubChem CID: 71316
- DrugBank: DB01226
- ChemSpider: 4444536
- UNII: 600ZG213C3
- KEGG: D00763
- ChEMBL: ChEMBL984
- CompTox Dashboard (EPA): DTXSID6048333

Chemical and physical data
- Formula: C_{58}H_{80}N_{2}O_{14}^{+2}
- Molar mass: 1029.278 g·mol^{−1}
- 3D model (JSmol): Interactive image
- SMILES: C[N+]1(CCc2cc(c(cc2[C@H]1Cc3cc(c(c(c3)OC)OC)OC)OC)OC)CCCOC(=O)CC/C=C/CCC(=O)OCCC[N+]4(CCc5cc(c(cc5[C@H]4Cc6cc(c(c(c6)OC)OC)OC)OC)OC)C.[Cl-].[Cl-]
- InChI: InChI=1S/C58H80N2O14.2ClH/c1-59(25-21-41-35-47(63-3)49(65-5)37-43(41)45(59)29-39-31-51(67-7)57(71-11)52(32-39)68-8)23-17-27-73-55(61)19-15-13-14-16-20-56(62)74-28-18-24-60(2)26-22-42-36-48(64-4)50(66-6)38-44(42)46(60)30-40-33-53(69-9)58(72-12)54(34-40)70-10;;/h13-14,31-38,45-46H,15-30H2,1-12H3;2*1H/q+2;;/p-2/b14-13+;;/t45-,46-,59?,60?;;/m1../s1; Key:WMSYWJSZGVOIJW-ONUALHDOSA-L

Mivacurium chloride (formerly recognized as BW1090U81, BW B1090U or BW1090U) is a short-duration non-depolarizing neuromuscular-blocking drug or skeletal muscle relaxant in the category of non-depolarizing neuromuscular-blocking drugs, used adjunctively in anesthesia to facilitate endotracheal intubation and to provide skeletal muscle relaxation during surgery or mechanical ventilation.

== Structure ==
Mivacurium is a symmetrical molecule existing as a mixture of three of twenty possible isomers: the isomerism stems from chirality at the C-1 carbon position of both the tetrahydroisoquinolinium rings, as well as both the positively charged nitrogen (onium) heads, and the E/Z diastereomerism at the C=C double bond of the oct-4-ene diester bridge. Thus, owing to the symmetry and chirality, the three isomers of mivacurium are (E)-1R,1'R,2R,2'R, (identified as BW1217U84), (E)-1R,1'R,2R,2'S, (BW1333U83) and (E)-1R,1'R,1'S,2'S, (BW1309U83). These are also known as cis-cis, cis-trans and trans-trans mivacurium. The proportions are; (E)-cis-cis 6% of the mixture, (E)-cis-trans 36% of the mixture and (E)-trans-trans 56% of the mixture. Unlike the potency of the cis-cis isomer of atracurium (also known as 51W89 and eventually produced as the drug cisatracurium), the cis-cis isomer of mivacurium has by far the lowest potency as a muscle relaxant when compared with its other two stereoisomers. It has approximately 10% of the activity of each of the other two structures.

Mivacurium belongs to a class of compounds that is commonly and erroneously referred to as "benzylisoquinolines;" mivacurium is in fact a bisbenzyltetrahydroisoquinolinium agent, often abbreviated to bbTHIQ.

The orientation of the two O atoms in the bridge is to the THIQ side of the carbonyl C=O group, whereas in atracurium the O atom is on the bridge side. Atracurium's groups are "reversed ester" linkages. This makes ester hydrolysis degradation by plasma cholinesterase more favourable.

== Pharmacology ==
Having ten methoxy -OCH_{3} groups, mivacurium is a more potent neuromuscular blocking drug than atracurium (which has eight), but is less potent than doxacurium (which has twelve).

Like other non-depolarizing neuromuscular blocking agents, the pharmacological action of mivacurium is antagonism to nicotinic acetylcholine receptors. However, unlike other non-depolarizing neuromuscular blockers, it is metabolized by plasma cholinesterase (similar to the depolarizing neuromuscular blocking agent succinylcholine).

== Availability ==
Mivacurium is available worldwide. It became unavailable in the United States in 2006 due to manufacturing issues, but was reintroduced in 2016.

== History ==
Mivacurium represents the second generation of tetrahydroisoquinolinium neuromuscular blocking drugs in a long lineage of nicotinic acetylcholine receptor antagonists synthesized by Mary M. Jackson and James C. Wisowaty, PhD (both chemists within the Chemical Development Laboratories at Burroughs Wellcome Co., Research Triangle Park, NC) in collaboration with John J. Savarese MD (who at the time was an anesthesiologist in the Dept. of Anesthesia, Harvard Medical School at the Massachusetts General Hospital, Boston, MA).

Specifically, mivacurium was first synthesized in 1981. Early structure-activity studies had confirmed that the bulky nature of the "benzylisoquinolinium" entity provided a non-depolarizing mechanism of action. Partial saturation of the benzylisoquinoline ring to the tetrahydroisoquinoline ring provided an even further increase in potency of the molecules without detrimental effects to other pharmacological properties: this key finding led to the rapid adoption of the tetrahydroisoquinolinium structures as a standard building block (along with a 1-benzyl attachment), and it is the primary reason why the continued unwarranted reference to "benzylisoquinolinium" is a complete misnomer for all clinically introduced and currently used neuromuscular blocking agents in this class because they are all, in fact, tetrahydroisoquinoline derivatives. By definition, therefore, there has never been, in the history of clinical anesthetic practice, the use of a benzylisoquinoline neuromuscular blocking agent.

The heritage of mivacurium and indeed its very closely related cousin, doxacurium chloride, harks back to the synthesis of numerous compounds following structure-activity relationships that drove researchers to find the ideal replacement for succinylcholine (suxamethonium). Both mivacurium and doxacurium are descendants of early vigorous attempts to synthesize potent non-depolarizing agents with pharmacophores derived from cross-combinations of the non-depolarizing agent, laudexium, and the well-known depolarizing agent, succinylcholine (suxamethonium chloride). Ironically, laudexium itself was invented by a cross-combination between the prototypical non-depolarizing agent, d-tubocurarine and the depolarizing agent, decamethonium. From the 1950s through to the 1970s, the present-day concept of a neuromuscular blocking agent with a rapid onset and an ultra-short duration of action had not taken root: researchers and clinicians were still on the quest for potent but non-depolarizing replacements devoid of the histamine release and the dreaded "recurarizing" effects seen with tubocurarine and, more importantly, the absence of a depolarizing mechanism of action as seen with succinylcholine and decamethonium.

== Clinical pharmacology and pharmacokinetics ==
The first clinical trial of mivacurium (BW1090U), in 1984, was conducted in a cohort of 63 US patients undergoing surgical anesthesia. at the Harvard Medical School at Massachusetts General Hospital, Boston, MA. Preliminary data from the study confirmed a promise for this agent to elicit considerably lesser severity of histamine release than that observed with its immediate predecessor clinically tested agents, BW785U77 and BWA444U, which were discontinued from further clinical development. Mivacurium did not exhibit the ultra-short duration of action seen with BW785U; whereas, BW A444U produced an intermediate duration of action.

Mivacurium is a biodegradable neuromuscular blocking agent owing to its degradation by plasma cholinesterases - the esterases rapidly hydrolyze one ester moiety initially resulting in a two mono-quaternary metabolites of which one still has an intact ester moiety. The second ester is metabolized much more slowly, although the lack of a bis-quaternary structure effectively terminates the neuromuscular blocking action.
