= Suxamethonium chloride =

Chemical compound

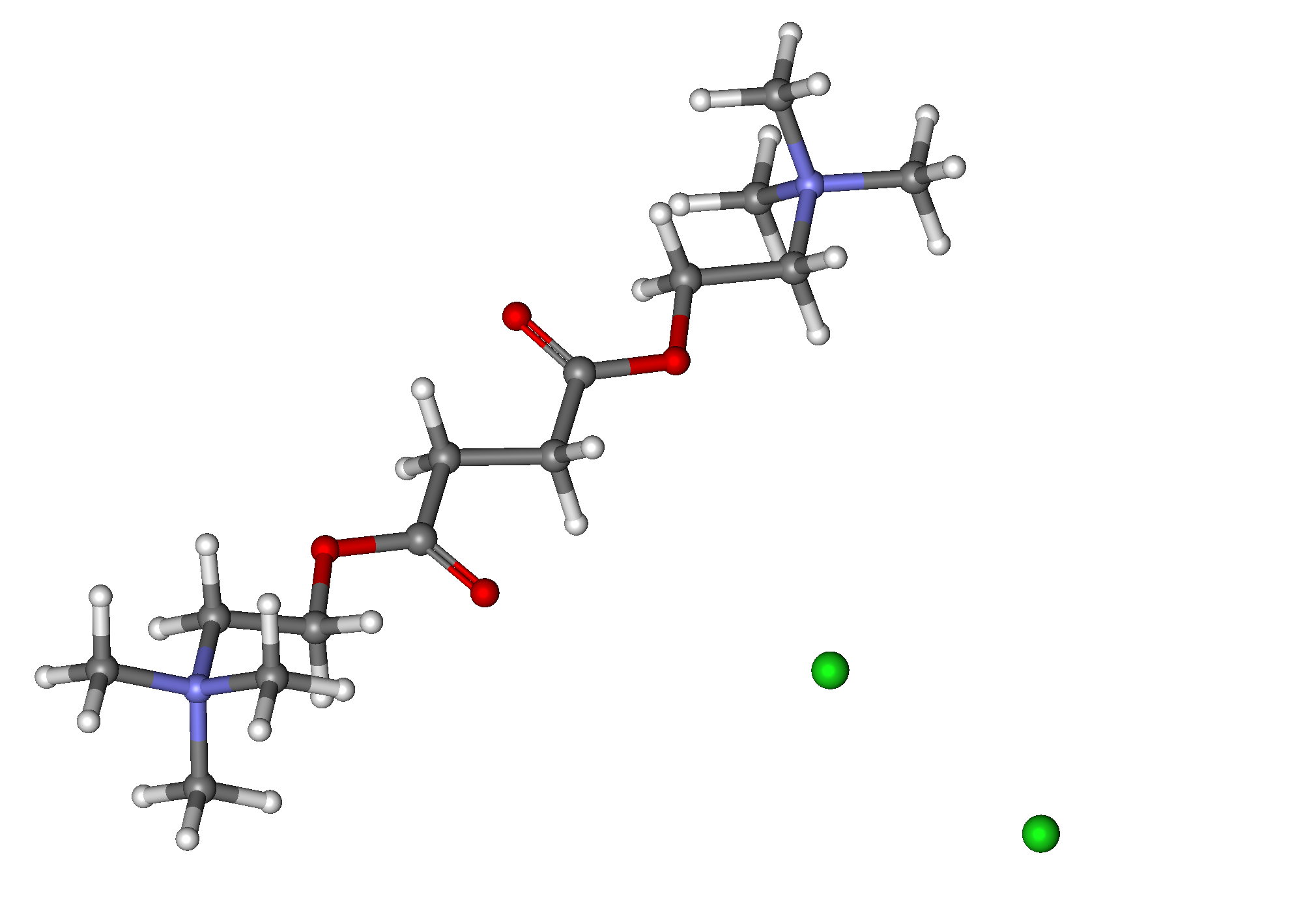

Clinical data
- Pronunciation: /ˌsʌksɪnɪlˈkoʊliːn/
- Trade names: Quelicin, Anectine, others
- AHFS/Drugs.com: Monograph
- License data: US DailyMed: Succinylcholine
- Pregnancy category: AU: A
- Routes of administration: Intravenous, intramuscular
- ATC code: M03AB01 (WHO)

Legal status
- Legal status: AU: S4 (Prescription only); CA: ℞-only; UK: POM (Prescription only); US: ℞-only

Pharmacokinetic data
- Bioavailability: NA
- Metabolism: By pseudocholinesterase, to succinylmonocholine and choline
- Onset of action: 30–60 sec (IV), 2–3 min (IM)
- Duration of action: < 10 min (IV), 10–30 min (IM)
- Excretion: Kidney (10%)

Identifiers
- IUPAC name: 2,2'-[(1,4-dioxobutane-1,4-diyl)bis(oxy)]bis (N,N,N-trimethylethanaminium)
- CAS Number: 306-40-1
- PubChem CID: 22475
- IUPHAR/BPS: 4004
- DrugBank: DB00202
- ChemSpider: 21080
- UNII: J2R869A8YF
- KEGG: D00766
- ChEBI: CHEBI:61219
- ChEMBL: ChEMBL983
- CompTox Dashboard (EPA): DTXSID7048455

Chemical and physical data
- Formula: C_{14}H_{30}Cl_{2}N_{2}O_{4}
- Molar mass: 361.30 g·mol^{−1}
- 3D model (JSmol): Interactive image
- SMILES: [Cl-].[Cl-].O=C(OCC[N+](C)(C)C)CCC(=O)OCC[N+](C)(C)C
- InChI: InChI=1S/C14H30N2O4.2ClH/c1-15(2,3)9-11-19-13(17)7-8-14(18)20-12-10-16(4,5)6;;/h7-12H2,1-6H3;2*1H/q+2;;/p-2; Key:YOEWQQVKRJEPAE-UHFFFAOYSA-L

Suxamethonium chloride (also known as suxamethonium or succinylcholine) is a neuromuscular-blocking drug. It is sometimes used to induce short-term paralysis to help with tracheal intubation or electroconvulsive therapy. It is usually administered by intravenous injection.

== Medical uses ==
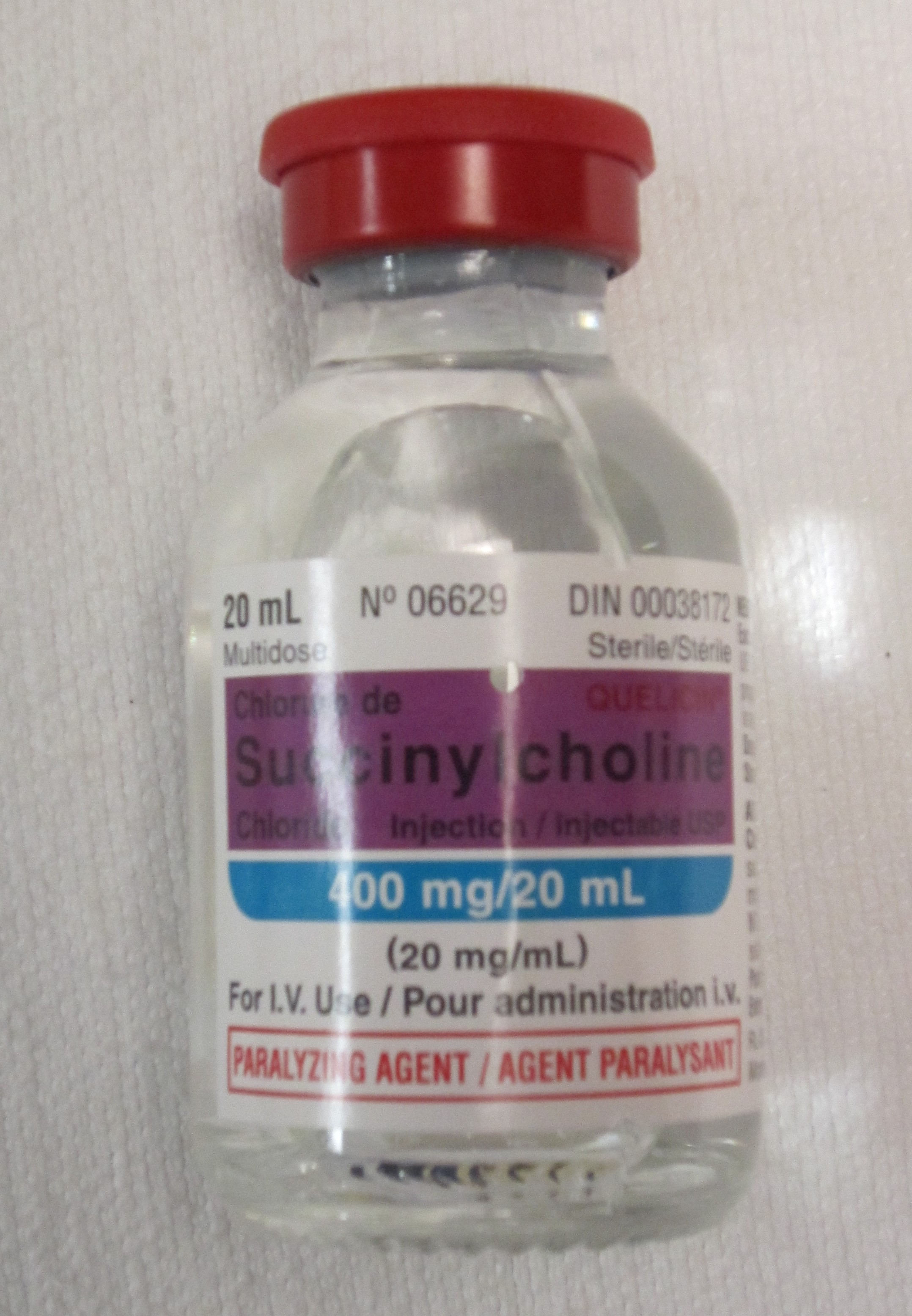
A vial of suxamethonium chloride

Succinylcholine chloride injection is indicated to facilitate tracheal intubation and to provide skeletal muscle relaxation during surgery or mechanical ventilation. Its medical uses are limited to short-term muscle relaxation in anesthesia and intensive care, usually for facilitation of endotracheal intubation. It is popular in emergency medicine due to its rapid onset and brief duration of action. The former is a major point of consideration in the context of trauma care, where endotracheal intubation may need to be completed very quickly (RSI / RSII). The latter means that, should attempts at endotracheal intubation fail and the person cannot be ventilated, there is a prospect for neuromuscular recovery and the onset of spontaneous breathing before low blood oxygen levels occurs. It may be better than rocuronium in people without contraindications due to its faster onset of action and shorter duration of action.

Suxamethonium is also commonly used as the sole muscle relaxant during electroconvulsive therapy, favoured for its short duration of action.

Suxamethonium is quickly degraded by plasma butyrylcholinesterase and the duration of effect is usually in the range of a few minutes. When plasma levels of butyrylcholinesterase are greatly diminished or an atypical form is present (an otherwise harmless inherited disorder), paralysis may last much longer, as is the case in liver failure or in neonates.

The vials are usually stored at a temperature between 2–8 °C. The multi-dose vials are stable for up to 14 days at room temperature without significant loss of potency. Unless otherwise indicated in the prescribing information, room temperature for storage of medications is 15–25 °C (59–77 °F).

== Side effects ==
Side effects include malignant hyperthermia, muscle pains, acute rhabdomyolysis with high blood levels of potassium, transient ocular hypertension, constipation and changes in cardiac rhythm, including slow heart rate, and cardiac arrest. In people with neuromuscular disease or burns an injection of suxamethonium can lead to a large release of potassium from skeletal muscles, potentially resulting in cardiac arrest. Conditions having susceptibility to suxamethonium-induced high blood potassium also include burns, sepsis, massive trauma, myopathy, and tetanus.

Suxamethonium does not produce unconsciousness or anesthesia, and its effects may cause considerable psychological distress while simultaneously making it impossible for a patient to communicate. Therefore, administration of the drug to a conscious patient is contraindicated.

=== Hyperkalemia ===
The side effect of high blood potassium may occur because the acetylcholine receptor is propped open, allowing continued flow of potassium ions into the extracellular fluid. A typical increase of potassium ion serum concentration on administration of suxamethonium is 0.5 mmol per liter.The increase is transient in otherwise healthy patients. The normal range of potassium is 3.5 to 5 mEq per liter. High blood potassium does not generally result in adverse effects below a concentration of 6.5 to 7 mEq per liter. Therefore, the increase in serum potassium level is usually not catastrophic in otherwise healthy patients. Severely high blood levels of potassium can cause changes in cardiac electrophysiology, which, if severe, can result in arrhythmias and even cardiac arrest.

=== Malignant hyperthermia ===
Administering suxamethonium and certain other anesthetics can result in a drastic and uncontrolled increase in skeletal muscle oxidative metabolism. This overwhelms the body's capacity to supply oxygen, remove carbon dioxide, and regulate body temperature, eventually leading to circulatory collapse and death if not treated quickly.

Susceptibility to malignant hyperthermia is often inherited as an autosomal dominant disorder, for which there are at least six genetic loci of interest, the most prominent being the ryanodine receptor gene (RYR1). MH susceptibility is phenotype and genetically related to central core disease (CCD), an autosomal dominant disorder characterized both by MH symptoms and by myopathy. MH is usually unmasked by anesthesia, or when a family member develops the symptoms. There is no simple, straightforward test to diagnose the condition. When MH develops during a procedure, treatment with dantrolene sodium is usually initiated; dantrolene and the avoidance of suxamethonium administration in susceptible people have markedly reduced the mortality from this condition.

=== Apnea ===
The normal short duration of action of suxamethonium is due to the rapid metabolism of the drug by non-specific plasma cholinesterases. However, plasma cholinesterase activity is reduced in some people due to either genetic variation or acquired conditions, which results in a prolonged duration of neuromuscular block. Genetically, ninety six percent of the population have a normal (Eu:Eu) genotype and block duration; however, some people have atypical genes (Ea, Es, Ef) which can be found in varying combinations with the Eu gene, or other atypical genes (see Pseudocholinesterase deficiency). Such genes will result in a longer duration of action of the drug, ranging from 20 minutes up to several hours. Acquired factors that affect plasma cholinesterase activity include pregnancy, liver disease, kidney failure, heart failure, thyrotoxicosis, and cancer, as well as a number of other drugs.

If unrecognized by a clinician it could lead to awareness if anesthesia is discontinued whilst still paralyzed or hypoxemia (and potentially fatal consequences) if artificial ventilation is not maintained. Normal treatment is to maintain sedation and ventilate the patient in an intensive care unit until muscle function has returned. Blood testing for cholinesterase function can be performed.

Mivacurium, a non-depolarizing neuromuscular blocking drug, is also metabolized via the same route with a similar clinical effect in patients deficient in plasma cholinesterase activity.

Deliberate induction of conscious apnea using this drug led to its use as a form of aversion therapy in the 1960s and 1970s in some prison and institutional settings. This use was discontinued after negative publicity concerning the terrifying effects on subjects of this treatment and ethical questions about the punitive use of painful aversion.

== Mechanism of action ==
There are two phases to the blocking effect of suxamethonium.

=== Phase 1 block ===
Phase 1 blocking has the principal paralytic effect. Binding of suxamethonium to the nicotinic acetylcholine receptor results in opening of the receptor's ion channel; a depolarization of the motor end-plate occurs and calcium is released from the sarcoplasmic reticulum leading to initial muscle contraction and fasciculations.

In normal skeletal muscle, acetylcholine dissociates from the receptor following depolarization and is rapidly hydrolyzed by acetylcholinesterase. The muscle cell is then ready for the next signal.

Suxamethonium is not hydrolyzed by acetylcholinesterase. By remaining bound to the acetylcholine receptor and maintaining the membrane potential above threshold, it does not allow the muscle cell to completely repolarize. This results in the inability for the voltage gated sodium channels to reset and instead are held in an inactive state leading to an inability to form further action potentials.

Voltage gated calcium channels likely close as the partially depolarised membrane potential remains between -30mV and -60mV, which is below the opening of the voltage gated calcium channel, approximately -10mV. Subsequently calcium is removed from the muscle cell cytoplasm . As the calcium is taken up by the sarcoplasmic reticulum, the muscle relaxes resulting in muscle flaccidity.

The results are membrane depolarization and transient fasciculations, followed by flaccid paralysis.

=== Phase 2 block ===
While this phase is not abnormal and is a part of its mechanism of action, it is undesirable during surgery, due to the inability to depolarize the cell again. Often, patients must be on a ventilator for hours if Phase 2 block occurs. It generally occurs when suxamethonium is administered multiple times, or during an infusion occurring over too much time, but can also occur during an initial bolus if the plasma cholinesterase is abnormal Desensitization may occur at the nerve terminal causing the myocyte to become less sensitive to acetylcholine, resulting in the membrane repolarizing and being unable be depolarized again for a period of time.

== Chemistry ==
Suxamethonium is an odorless, white crystalline substance. Aqueous solutions have a pH of about 4. The dihydrate melts at 160 °C, whereas the anhydrous melts at 190 °C. It is highly soluble in water (1 gram in about 1 mL), soluble in ethyl alcohol (1 gram in about 350 mL), slightly soluble in chloroform, and practically insoluble in ether. Suxamethonium is a hygroscopic compound. The compound consists of two acetylcholine molecules that are linked by their acetyl groups. It can also be viewed as a central moiety of succinic acid with two choline moieties, one on each end.

== History ==
Suxamethonium was first discovered in 1906 by Reid Hunt and René de M. Taveau. When studying the drug, animals were given curare and thus they missed the neuromuscular blocking properties of suxamethonium. Instead in 1949 an Italian group led by Daniel Bovet was first to describe succinylcholine induced paralysis. The clinical introduction of suxamethonium was described in 1951 by several groups. Papers published by Stephen Thesleff and Otto von Dardel in Sweden are important but also to be mentioned is work by Bruck, Mayrhofer and Hassfurther in Austria, Scurr and Bourne in UK, and Foldes in America.

== Abuse ==
Dubai authorities declared that the assassination of Mahmoud Al-Mabhouh, a Hamas operative, was carried out on their soil by Mossad agents with the use of suxamethonium chloride injection. Entering Dubai under false passports in 2010, the Mossad agents found al-Mabhouh at a hotel, immobilized him with the drug, electrocuted him, and suffocated him with a pillow. A high concentration of suxamethonium chloride was found in al-Mabhouh's body post-mortem. The incident triggered significant diplomatic crises in the Middle East, Europe, and Australia.

== Brand names ==
It is available in German-speaking countries under the trade name Lysthenon among others.

== Use in animals ==
It is sometimes used in combination with pain medications and sedatives for euthanasia and immobilization of horses.
