= Butyrylcholine =

- Butyrylcholine

Names
- Preferred IUPAC name 2-(Butanoyloxy)-N,N,N-trimethylethan-1-aminium
- Other names: BCh

Identifiers
CAS Number	3922-86-9
3D model (JSmol)	Interactive image
ChEMBL	ChEMBL342902
ChemSpider	13856024
PubChem CID	17233
UNII	BCD8KEA5TE
CompTox Dashboard (EPA)	DTXSID10959994
- InChI: InChI=1S/C9H20NO2/c1-5-6-8(11)9(12)7-10(2,3)4/h9,12H,5-7H2,1-4H3/q+1 Key: MIJKNCXGUHHZJA-UHFFFAOYSA-N; InChI=1/C9H20NO2/c1-5-6-8(11)9(12)7-10(2,3)4/h9,12H,5-7H2,1-4H3/q+1 Key: MIJKNCXGUHHZJA-UHFFFAOYAU
- SMILES: O=C(CCC)OCC[N+](C)(C)C

Properties
Chemical formula	C_{9}H_{20}NO_{2}^{+}
Molar mass	174.262 g/mol
- Except where otherwise noted, data are given for materials in their standard state (at 25 °C [77 °F], 100 kPa). verify (what is ?) Infobox references

Butyrylcholine is a choline-based ester that can function as a neurotransmitter. It is similar to acetylcholine and interacts with of some of the same receptors as acetylcholine, such as nicotinic receptors. Butyrylcholine is synthetic and does not occur in the body naturally. The molecule is extremely hydrophobic and is practically insoluble in water.

== Usage ==
It is used as a clinical laboratory tool to distinguish between the cholinesterases; acetylcholinesterase and butyrylcholinesterase preferentially lyse acetylcholine and butyrylcholine, respectively.
