= C16H23NO =

The molecular formula C_{16}H_{23}NO may refer to:

- Anazocine, an opioid analgesic
- Benzofuranylpropylaminopentane, a stimulant
- Dezocine, an opioid analgesic
- Inaperisone, a muscle relaxant
- 3-Me-PVP
- α-PHiP, a psychoactive drug
- Pyrovalerone, a psychoactive drug
- α-Pyrrolidinohexiophenone, a stimulant
- Tolperisone, a muscle relaxant
