= C65H82N2O18S2 =

The molecular formula C_{65}H_{82}N_{2}O_{18}S_{2} (molar mass: 1243.49 g/mol) may refer to:

- Atracurium besilate
- Cisatracurium besilate
