= C21H27NO4 =

The molecular formula C_{21}H_{27}NO_{4} (molar mass: 357.44 g/mol) may refer to:

- Laudanosine, a toxic metabolite of atracurium and cisatracurium that decreases the seizure threshold
- Nalbuphine, a synthetic opioid
