= Glycine receptor antagonist =

Class of pharmaceutical compounds

A glycine receptor antagonist is a drug which acts as an antagonist of the glycine receptor.

== Examples ==
=== Antagonists ===
- Selective
  - Brucine
  - Strychnine
  - Tutin
- Non-selective
  - Bicuculline
  - Caffeine
  - Picrotoxin
  - Pitrazepin
  - Thiocolchicoside

== See also ==
- Glycine receptor agonist
