= Lanperisone =

Muscle relaxant drug

Clinical data
- ATC code: None

Identifiers
- IUPAC name: (2R)-2-Methyl-3-(1-pyrrolidinyl)-1-[4-(trifluoromethyl)phenyl]-1-propanone
- CAS Number: 116287-14-0
- PubChem CID: 198707
- ChemSpider: 171991
- UNII: TO2JP2G53H
- ChEBI: CHEBI:176339
- ChEMBL: ChEMBL1951050
- CompTox Dashboard (EPA): DTXSID501336079 DTXSID4048856, DTXSID501336079

Chemical and physical data
- Formula: C_{15}H_{18}F_{3}NO
- Molar mass: 285.310 g·mol^{−1}
- 3D model (JSmol): Interactive image
- SMILES: C[C@H](CN1CCCC1)C(=O)C2=CC=C(C=C2)C(F)(F)F
- InChI: InChI=1S/C15H18F3NO/c1-11(10-19-8-2-3-9-19)14(20)12-4-6-13(7-5-12)15(16,17)18/h4-7,11H,2-3,8-10H2,1H3/t11-/m1/s1; Key:RYZCWZZJFAKYHX-LLVKDONJSA-N

Lanperisone (INN) is a muscle relaxant.

== See also ==
Chemically and mechanistically related drugs:

- Eperisone
- Inaperisone
- Silperisone
- Tolperisone
