= Fazadinium bromide =

Chemical compound

Clinical data
- Trade names: Fazadon
- ATC code: M03AC08 (WHO)

Identifiers
- IUPAC name: (E)-bis(3-methyl-2-phenylimidazo[3,2-a] pyridin-4-ium-1-yl)diazene dibromide
- CAS Number: 49564-56-9
- PubChem CID: 6321422
- ChemSpider: 21161354
- UNII: 8WV5538LFK
- KEGG: D07273
- CompTox Dashboard (EPA): DTXSID4023040
- ECHA InfoCard: 100.051.236

Chemical and physical data
- Formula: C_{28}H_{24}Br_{2}N_{6}
- Molar mass: 604.350 g·mol^{−1}
- 3D model (JSmol): Interactive image
- SMILES: Cc1c(n(c2[n+]1cccc2)N=Nn3c4cccc[n+]4c(c3c5ccccc5)C)c6ccccc6.[Br-].[Br-]
- InChI: InChI=1S/C28H24N6.2BrH/c1-21-27(23-13-5-3-6-14-23)33(25-17-9-11-19-31(21)25)29-30-34-26-18-10-12-20-32(26)22(2)28(34)24-15-7-4-8-16-24;;/h3-20H,1-2H3;2*1H/q+2;;/p-2; Key:LBOZSXSPRGACHC-UHFFFAOYSA-L

Fazadinium bromide is a muscle relaxant which acts as a nicotinic acetylcholine receptor antagonist through neuromuscular blockade.
