= Atracurium besilate =

Chemical compound

Clinical data
- Trade names: Tracrium, Acurium
- Other names: Atracurium besylate
- AHFS/Drugs.com: Monograph
- Pregnancy category: C
- Routes of administration: IV
- ATC code: M03AC04 (WHO)

Legal status
- Legal status: In general: ℞ (Prescription only)

Pharmacokinetic data
- Bioavailability: 100% (IV)
- Protein binding: 82%
- Metabolism: Hofmann elimination (retro-Michael addition) and ester hydrolysis by nonspecific esterases
- Elimination half-life: 17–21 minutes

Identifiers
- IUPAC name: 2,2'-{1,5-Pentanediylbis[oxy(3-oxo-3,1-propanediyl)]}bis[1-(3,4-dimethoxybenzyl)-6,7-dimethoxy-2-methyl-1,2,3,4-tetrahydroisoquinolinium] dibenzenesulfonate
- CAS Number: 64228-81-5
- PubChem CID: 47320
- DrugBank: DB00732
- ChemSpider: 43068
- UNII: 40AX66P76P
- KEGG: D00758
- ChEBI: CHEBI:2915
- ChEMBL: ChEMBL1200527
- CompTox Dashboard (EPA): DTXSID6022630
- ECHA InfoCard: 100.058.840

Chemical and physical data
- Formula: C_{65}H_{82}N_{2}O_{18}S_{2}
- Molar mass: 1243.49 g·mol^{−1}
- 3D model (JSmol): Interactive image
- Melting point: 85 to 90 °C (185 to 194 °F)
- SMILES: C[N+]1(CCc2cc(c(cc2C1Cc3ccc(c(c3)OC)OC)OC)OC)CCC(=O)OCCCCCOC(=O)CC[N+]4(CCc5cc(c(cc5C4Cc6ccc(c(c6)OC)OC)OC)OC)C.c1ccc(cc1)S(=O)(=O)[O-].c1ccc(cc1)S(=O)(=O)[O-]
- InChI: InChI=1S/C53H72N2O12.2C6H6O3S/c1-54(22-18-38-32-48(62-7)50(64-9)34-40(38)42(54)28-36-14-16-44(58-3)46(30-36)60-5)24-20-52(56)66-26-12-11-13-27-67-53(57)21-25-55(2)23-19-39-33-49(63-8)51(65-10)35-41(39)43(55)29-37-15-17-45(59-4)47(31-37)61-6;2*7-10(8,9)6-4-2-1-3-5-6/h14-17,30-35,42-43H,11-13,18-29H2,1-10H3;2*1-5H,(H,7,8,9)/q+2;;/p-2; Key:XXZSQOVSEBAPGS-UHFFFAOYSA-L

Atracurium besilate, also known as atracurium besylate, is a medication used in addition to other medications to provide skeletal muscle relaxation during surgery or mechanical ventilation. It can also be used to help with endotracheal intubation but suxamethonium (succinylcholine) is generally preferred if this needs to be done quickly. It is given by injection into a vein. Effects are greatest at about 4 minutes and last for up to an hour.

Common side effects include flushing of the skin and low blood pressure. Serious side effects may include allergic reactions; however, it has not been associated with malignant hyperthermia. Prolonged paralysis may occur in people with conditions like myasthenia gravis. It is unclear if use in pregnancy is safe for the baby. Atracurium is in the neuromuscular-blocker family of medications and is of the non-depolarizing type. It works by blocking the action of acetylcholine on skeletal muscles.

Atracurium was approved for medical use in the United States in 1983. It is on the World Health Organization's List of Essential Medicines. Atracurium is available as a generic medication.

== Medical uses ==
Atracurium is a medication used in addition to other medications in to provide skeletal muscle relaxation during surgery or mechanical ventilation. It can be used to help with endotracheal intubation but takes up to 2.5 minutes to result in appropriate intubating conditions.

=== Duration of action ===
Neuromuscular-blocking agents can be classified in accordance to their duration of pharmacological action, defined as follows:

Classification of neuromuscular-blocking agents by duration of pharmacological action (minutes)
Parameter	Ultra-short Duration	Short Duration	Intermediate Duration	Long Duration
Clinical Duration (Time from injection to T_{25%} recovery)	6-8	12-20	30-45	>60
Recovery Time (Time from injection to T_{95%} recovery)	<15	25-30	50-70	90-180
Recovery Index (T_{25%}-T_{75%} recovery slope)	2-3	6	10-15	>30

== Side effects ==
=== Cardiovascular ===
The tetrahydroisoquinolinium class of neuromuscular blocking agents, in general, is associated with histamine release upon rapid administration of a bolus intravenous injection. There are some exceptions to this rule; cisatracurium (Nimbex), for example, is one such agent that does not elicit histamine release even up to 5×ED_{95} doses. The liberation of histamine is a dose-dependent phenomenon such that, with increasing doses administered at the same rate, there is a greater propensity for eliciting histamine release and its ensuing sequelae. Most commonly, the histamine release following administration of these agents is associated with observable cutaneous flushing (facial face and arms, commonly), hypotension and a consequent reflex tachycardia. These sequelae are very transient effects: the total duration of the cardiovascular effects is no more than one to two minutes, while the facial flush may take around 3–4 minutes to dissipate. Because these effects are so transient, there is no reason to administer adjunctive therapy to ameliorate either the cutaneous or the cardiovascular effects.

=== Bronchospasm ===
Bronchospasm has been reported on occasion with the use of atracurium. However, this particular undesirable effect does not appear to be observed nearly as often as that seen with rapacuronium, which led to the latter's withdrawal of approval for clinical use worldwide.

The issue of bronchospasm acquired prominence in the neuromuscular-blocking agents arena after the withdrawal from clinical use of rapacuronium (Raplon - a steroidal neuromuscular-blocking agent marketed by Organon) in 2001 after several serious events of bronchospasm, including five unexplained fatalities, following its administration. Bronchospasm was not an unknown phenomenon prior to rapacuronium: occasional reports of bronchospasm have been noted also with the prototypical agents, tubocurarine and succinylcholine, as well as alcuronium, pancuronium, vecuronium, and gallamine.

=== Seizures ===
Seizures rarely occur.

Because atracurium undergoes Hofmann elimination as a primary route of chemodegradation, one of the major metabolites from this process is laudanosine, a tertiary amino alkaloid reported to be a modest CNS stimulant with epileptogenic activity and cardiovascular effects such a hypotension and bradycardia. As part of the then fierce marketing battle between the competing pharmaceutical companies (Burroughs Wellcome Co. and Organon, Inc.) with their respective products, erroneous information was quickly and subtly disseminated very shortly after the clinical introduction of atracurium that the clinical use of atracurium was likely to result in a terrible tragedy because of the significant clinical hazard by way of frank seizures induced by the laudanosine by-product - the posited hypothesis being that the laudanosine produced from the chemodegradation of parent atracurium would cross the blood–brain barrier in sufficiently high enough concentrations that lead to epileptogenic foci. Fortunately, both for the public and for atracurium, rapid initial investigations irrefutably failed to find any overt or EEG evidence for a connection between atracurium administration and epileptogenic activity. Indeed, because laudanosine is cleared primarily via renal excretion, a cat study modelling anephric patients went so far as to corroborate that EEG changes, when observed, were evident only at plasma concentrations 8 to 10 times greater than those observed in humans during infusions of atracurium. Thus, the cat study predicted that, following atracurium administration in an anephric patient, laudanosine accumulation and related CNS or cardiovascular toxicity were unlikely - a prediction that correlated very well with a study in patients with kidney failure and undergoing cadaveric renal transplantation. Furthermore, almost a decade later, work by Cardone et al.. confirmed that, in fact, it is the steroidal neuromuscular-blocking agents pancuronium and vecuronium that, when introduced directly into the CNS, were likely to cause acute excitement and seizures, owing to accumulation of cytosolic calcium caused by activation of acetylcholine receptor ion channels. Unlike the two steroidal agents, neither atracurium nor laudanosine caused such accumulation of intracellular calcium. Just over two decades later with availability of atracurium, there is little doubt that laudanosine accumulation and related toxicity will likely never be seen with the doses of atracurium that are generally used.

Laudanosine is also a metabolite of cisatracurium that, because of its identical structure to atracurium, undergoes chemodegradation via Hofmann elimination in vivo. Plasma concentrations of laudanosine generated are lower when cisatracurium is used.

== Pharmacokinetics ==
Atracurium is susceptible to degradation by Hofmann elimination and ester hydrolysis as components of the in vivo metabolic processes. The initial in vitro studies appeared to indicate a major role for ester hydrolysis but, with accumulation of clinical data over time, the preponderance of evidence indicated that Hofmann elimination at physiological pH is the major degradation pathway vindicating the premise for the design of atracurium to undergo an organ-independent metabolism.

Hofmann elimination is a temperature- and pH-dependent process, and therefore atracurium's rate of degradation in vivo is highly influenced by body pH and temperature: An increase in body pH favors the elimination process, whereas a decrease in temperature slows down the process. Otherwise, the breakdown process is unaffected by the level of plasma esterase activity, obesity, age, or by the status of renal or hepatic function. On the other hand, excretion of the metabolite, laudanosine, and, to a small extent, atracurium itself is dependent on hepatic and renal functions that tend to be less efficient in the elderly population. The pharmaceutical presentation is a mixture of all ten possible stereoisomers. Although there are four stereocentres, which could give 16 structures, there is a plane of symmetry running through the centre of the diester bridge, and so 6 meso structures (structures that can be superimposed by having the opposite configuration then 180° rotation) are formed. This reduces the number from sixteen to ten. There are three cis-cis isomers (an enantiomeric pair and a meso structure), four cis-trans isomers (two enantiomeric pairs), and three trans-trans isomers (an enantiomeric pair and a meso structure). The proportions of cis−cis, cis−trans, and trans−trans isomers are in the ratio of 10.5 :6.2 :1. [cis-cis isomers ≈ 58% cis-trans isomers ≈ 36% trans-trans isomers ≈ 6%]. One of the three cis-cis structures is marketed as a single-isomer preparation, cisatracurium (trade name Nimbex); it has the configuration 1R, 2R, 1′R, 2′R at the four stereocentres. The beta-blocking drug nebivolol has ten similar structures with 4 stereocentres and a plane of symmetry, but only two are presented in the pharmaceutical preparation.

=== Intramuscular function parameters ===
- ED_{95}: the dose of any given intramuscular-blocking agent required to produce 95% suppression of muscle twitch (e.g., the abductor pollicis) response with balanced anesthesia
- Clinical duration: difference in time between time of injection and time to 25% recovery from neuromuscular block
- Train-of-four (TOF) response: stimulated muscle twitch response in trains of four when stimuli are applied in a burst of four as opposed to a single stimulus, equal depression in depolarizing and fading response with non-depolarizing blocker.
- 25%-75% recovery index: an indicator of the rate of skeletal muscle recovery - essentially, the difference in time between the time to recovery to 25% and time to recovery to 75% of baseline value
- T_{4}:T_{1} ≥ 0.7: a 70% ratio of the fourth twitch to the first twitch in a TOF - provides a measure of the recovery of neuromuscular function
- T_{4}:T_{1} ≥ 0.9: a 90% ratio of the fourth twitch to the first twitch in a TOF - provides a measure of the full recovery of neuromuscular function

== History ==
Atracurium besilate was first made in 1974 by George H. Dewar, a pharmacist and a medicinal chemistry doctoral candidate in John B. Stenlake's medicinal chemistry research group in the Department of Pharmacy at Strathclyde University, Scotland. Dewar first named this compound "33A74" before its eventual emergence in the clinic as atracurium. Atracurium was the culmination of a rational approach to drug design to produce the first non-depolarizing non-steroidal skeletal muscle relaxant that undergoes chemodegradation in vivo. The term chemodegradation was coined by Roger D. Waigh, Ph.D., also a pharmacist and a postdoctoral researcher in Stenlake's research group. Atracurium was licensed by Strathclyde University to the Wellcome Foundation UK, which developed the drug (then known as BW 33A) and its introduction to first human trials in 1979, and then eventually to its first introduction (as a mixture of all ten stereoisomers) into clinical anesthetic practice in the UK, in 1983, under the tradename of Tracrium.

The premise to the design of atracurium and several of its congeners stemmed from the knowledge that a bis-quaternary structure is essential for neuromuscular-blocking activity: ideally, therefore, a chemical entity devoid of this bis-quaternary structure via susceptibility to inactive breakdown products by enzymic-independent processes would prove to be invaluable in the clinical use of a drug with a predictable onset and duration of action. Hofmann elimination provided precisely this basis: It is a chemical process in which a suitably activated quaternary ammonium compound can be degraded by the mildly alkaline conditions present at physiological pH and temperature. In effect, Hofmann elimination is a retro-Michael addition chemical process. The physiological process of Hofmann elimination differs from the non-physiological Hofmann degradation process: the latter is a chemical reaction in which a quaternary ammonium hydroxide solid salt is heated to 100 °C, or an aqueous solution of the salt is boiled. Regardless of which Hofmann process is referenced, the end-products in both situations will be the same: an alkene and a tertiary amine.

The approach to utilizing Hofmann elimination as a means to promoting biodegradation had its roots in much earlier observations that the quaternary alkaloid petaline (obtained from the Lebanese plant Leontice leontopetalum) readily underwent facile Hofmann elimination to a tertiary amine called leonticine upon passage through a basic (as opposed to an acidic) ion-exchange resin. Stenlake's research group advanced this concept by systematically synthesizing numerous quaternary ammonium β-aminoesters and β-aminoketones and evaluated them for skeletal muscle relaxant activity: one of these compounds, initially labelled as 33A74, eventually led to further clinical development, and came to be known as atracurium.

Atracurium played a part in triggering the 2019 Samoa measles outbreak.
