= Pridinol =

Chemical compound

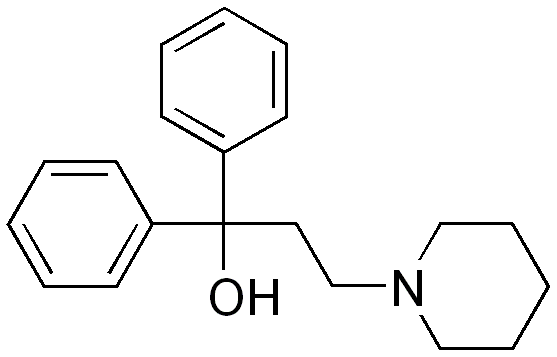

Clinical data
- Trade names: Myopridin
- AHFS/Drugs.com: International Drug Names
- Routes of administration: By mouth, parenteral
- ATC code: M03BX03 (WHO) combinations M03BX53 (WHO)

Legal status
- Legal status: UK: POM (Prescription only)

Identifiers
- IUPAC name: 1,1-Diphenyl-3-(piperidin-1-yl)propan-1-ol
- CAS Number: 511-45-5
- PubChem CID: 4904
- DrugBank: DB00945
- ChemSpider: 4735
- UNII: 9E75Q6SUUB
- ChEMBL: ChEMBL404215
- CompTox Dashboard (EPA): DTXSID0045090
- ECHA InfoCard: 100.007.390

Chemical and physical data
- Formula: C_{20}H_{25}NO
- Molar mass: 295.426 g·mol^{−1}
- 3D model (JSmol): Interactive image
- SMILES: OC(C1=CC=CC=C1)(C2=CC=CC=C2)CCN3CCCCC3
- InChI: InChI=1S/C20H25NO/c22-20(18-10-4-1-5-11-18,19-12-6-2-7-13-19)14-17-21-15-8-3-9-16-21/h1-2,4-7,10-13,22H,3,8-9,14-17H2; Key:RQXCLMGKHJWMOA-UHFFFAOYSA-N

Pridinol, sold under the brand name Myopridin, is a muscle relaxant, anticholinergic and antiparkinsonian drug. It has also been evaluated for the treatment of muscle related pain.

It was approved for medical use in the UK in May 2020. Pridinol bears structural similarity to another anti-muscarinic drug Diphenidol.
