= Styramate =

Chemical compound

Clinical data
- ATC code: M03BA04 (WHO)

Identifiers
- IUPAC name: (2-hydroxy-2-phenylethyl) carbamate
- CAS Number: 94-35-9
- PubChem CID: 7186
- ChemSpider: 6918
- UNII: CBK7Y28SP3
- KEGG: D07274
- CompTox Dashboard (EPA): DTXSID40861692
- ECHA InfoCard: 100.002.115

Chemical and physical data
- Formula: C_{9}H_{11}NO_{3}
- Molar mass: 181.191 g·mol^{−1}
- 3D model (JSmol): Interactive image
- SMILES: C1=CC=CC=C1C(COC(=O)N)O
- InChI: InChI=1S/C9H11NO3/c10-9(12)13-6-8(11)7-4-2-1-3-5-7/h1-5,8,11H,6H2,(H2,10,12); Key:OCSOHUROTFFTFO-UHFFFAOYSA-N

Styramate (brand name Sinaxar) is a muscle relaxant and anticonvulsant drug. At therapeutic doses, it does not produce significant sedative effects.

== See also ==
- Carisbamate
