= Silperisone =

Muscle relaxant drug

Clinical data
- ATC code: None

Identifiers
- IUPAC name: 1-{[(4-Fluorobenzyl)(dimethyl)silyl]methyl}piperidine
- CAS Number: 140944-31-6
- PubChem CID: 178568
- ChemSpider: 155434
- UNII: R16SK8726X
- CompTox Dashboard (EPA): DTXSID20161501

Chemical and physical data
- Formula: C_{15}H_{24}FNSi
- Molar mass: 265.447 g·mol^{−1}
- 3D model (JSmol): Interactive image
- SMILES: Fc1ccc(cc1)C[Si](C)(CN2CCCCC2)C
- InChI: InChI=1S/C15H24FNSi/c1-18(2,13-17-10-4-3-5-11-17)12-14-6-8-15(16)9-7-14/h6-9H,3-5,10-13H2,1-2H3; Key:LOCRKLISCBHQPO-UHFFFAOYSA-N

Silperisone (INN) is a muscle relaxant.

== See also ==
Chemically and mechanistically related drugs:

- Eperisone
- Inaperisone
- Lanperisone
- Tolperisone
