= Tetrazepam =

Chemical compound

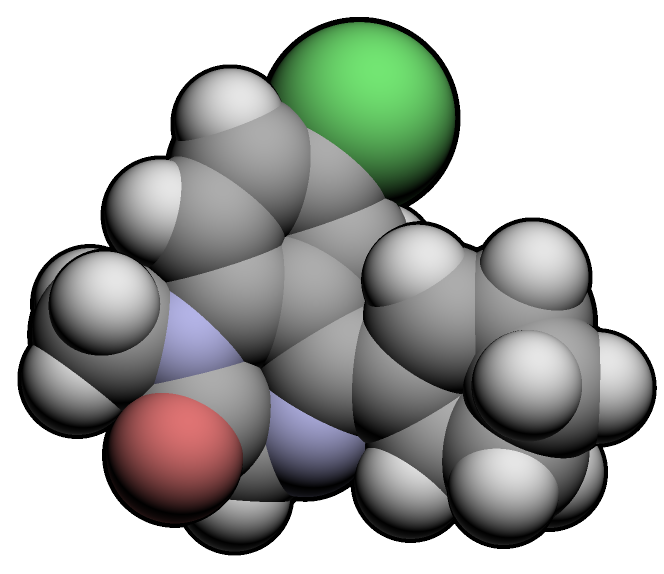

Clinical data
- AHFS/Drugs.com: International Drug Names
- Routes of administration: Oral
- ATC code: M03BX07 (WHO)

Legal status
- Legal status: BR: Class B1 (Psychoactive drugs); CA: Schedule IV; DE: Prescription only (Anlage III for higher doses); UK: Class C; US: Schedule IV

Pharmacokinetic data
- Elimination half-life: 3–26 hours

Identifiers
- IUPAC name: 7-chloro-5-(cyclohexen-1-yl)-1-methyl-3H-1,4-benzodiazepin-2-one
- CAS Number: 10379-14-3
- PubChem CID: 25215
- ChemSpider: 23551
- UNII: FO92091VP8
- KEGG: D07277
- CompTox Dashboard (EPA): DTXSID00146058
- ECHA InfoCard: 100.030.749

Chemical and physical data
- Formula: C_{16}H_{17}ClN_{2}O
- Molar mass: 288.77 g·mol^{−1}
- 3D model (JSmol): Interactive image
- SMILES: CN1C(=O)CN=C(C2=C1C=CC(=C2)Cl)C3=CCCCC3
- InChI: InChI=1S/C16H17ClN2O/c1-19-14-8-7-12(17)9-13(14)16(18-10-15(19)20)11-5-3-2-4-6-11/h5,7-9H,2-4,6,10H2,1H3; Key:IQWYAQCHYZHJOS-UHFFFAOYSA-N

Tetrazepam (brand names Clinoxan, Epsipam, Myolastan, Musaril, Relaxam and Spasmorelax) is a benzodiazepine derivative with anticonvulsant, anxiolytic, muscle relaxant and slightly hypnotic properties. It was formerly used mainly in Austria, France, Belgium, Germany and Spain to treat muscle spasm, anxiety disorders such as panic attacks, or more rarely to treat depression, premenstrual syndrome or agoraphobia. Tetrazepam has relatively little sedative effect at low doses while still producing useful muscle relaxation and anxiety relief. The Co-ordination Group for Mutual Recognition and Decentralised Procedures-Human (CMD(h)) endorsed the Pharmacovigilance Risk Assessment Committee (PRAC) recommendation to suspend the marketing authorisations of tetrazepam-containing medicines across the European Union (EU) in April 2013. The European Commission has confirmed the suspension of the marketing authorisations for Tetrazepam in Europe because of cutaneous toxicity, effective from the 1 August 2013.

Delayed type 4 allergic hypersensitivity reactions including maculopapular exanthema, erythematous rash, urticarial eruption, erythema multiforme, photodermatitis, eczema and Stevens–Johnson syndrome can occasionally occur as a result of tetrazepam exposure. These hypersensitivity reactions to tetrazepam share no cross-reactivity with other benzodiazepines.

== Indications ==
Tetrazepam is used therapeutically as a muscle relaxant.

== Availability ==
The indicated adult dose for muscle spasm is 25 mg to 150 mg per day, increased if necessary to a maximum of 300 mg per day, in divided doses. Tetrazepam is not generally recommended for use in children, except on the advice of a specialist.

Tetrazepam is only available in one strength and formulation, 50 mg tablets. The benzodiazepine equivalent of tetrazepam is approximately 100 mg of tetrazepam = 10 mg of diazepam.

== Adverse effects ==
Allergic reactions to tetrazepam occasionally occur involving the skin.

Allergic reactions can develop to tetrazepam and it is considered to be a potential allergen. Drug rash and drug-induced eosinophilia with systemic symptoms is a known complication of tetrazepam exposure. These hypersensitive allergic reactions can be of the delayed type.

Toxic epidermal necrolysis has occurred from the use of tetrazepam including at least one reported death. Stevens–Johnson syndrome and erythema multiforme has been reported from use of tetrazepam. Cross-reactivity with other benzodiazepines does not typically occur in such patients. Exanthema and eczema may occur. The lack of cross-reactivity with other benzodiazepines is believed to be due to the molecular structure of tetrazepam. Photodermatitis and phototoxicity have also been reported. Occupational contact allergy can also develop from regularly handling tetrazepam. Airborne contact dermatitis can also occur as an allergy which can develop from occupational exposure.

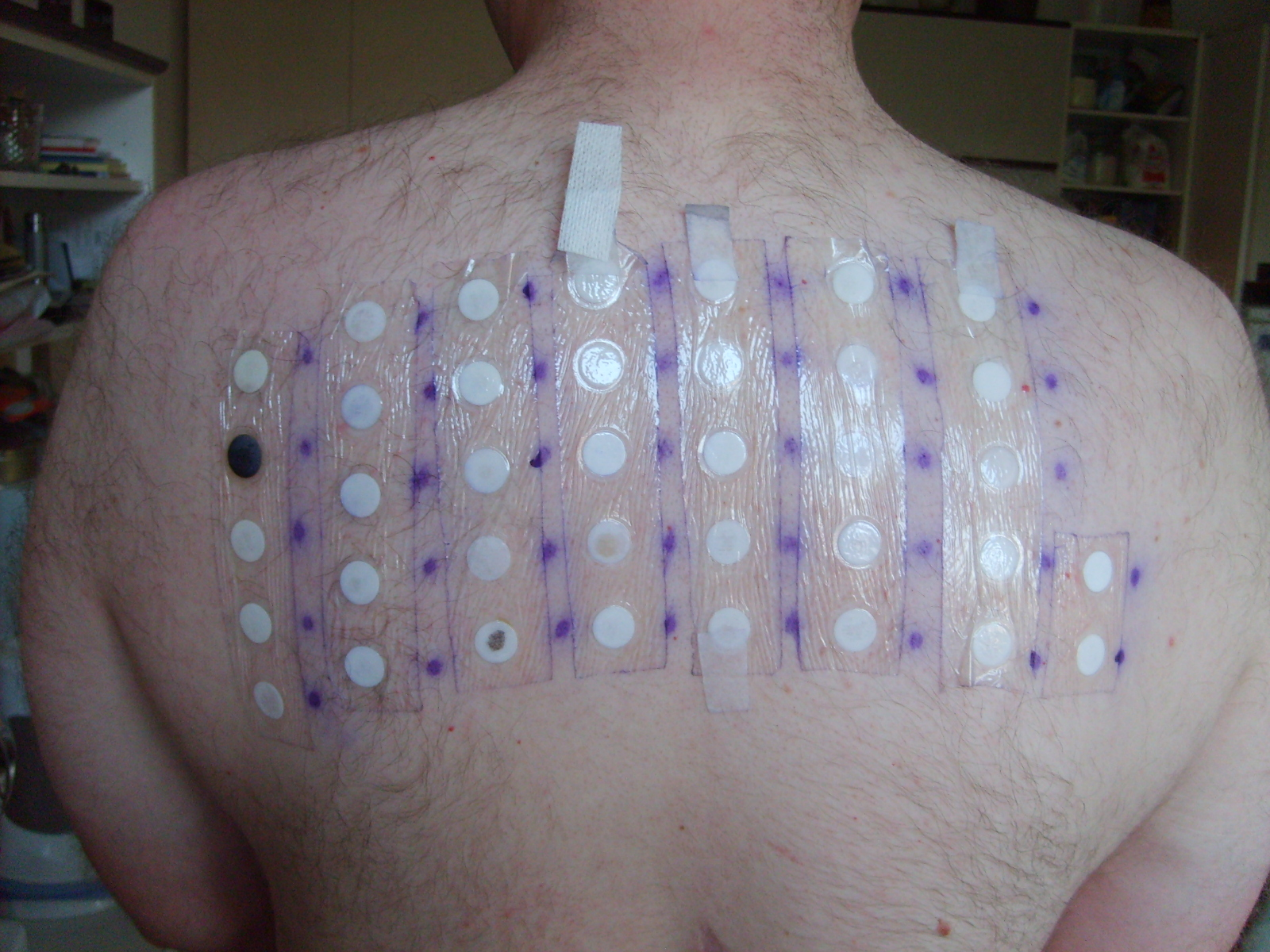
Patch test

Patch testing has been used successfully to demonstrate tetrazepam allergy. Oral testing can also be used. Skin prick tests are not always accurate and may produce false negatives.

Drowsiness is a common side effect of tetrazepam. A reduction in muscle force can occur. Myasthenia gravis, a condition characterised by severe muscle weakness is another potential adverse effect from tetrazepam. Cardiovascular and respiratory adverse effects can occur with tetrazepam similar to other benzodiazepines.

=== Tolerance, dependence and withdrawal ===
Prolonged use, as with all benzodiazepines, should be avoided, as tolerance occurs and there is a risk of benzodiazepine dependence and a benzodiazepine withdrawal syndrome after stopping or reducing dosage.

== Overdose ==
Tetrazepam, like other benzodiazepines is a drug which is very frequently present in cases of overdose. These overdoses are often mixed overdoses, i.e. a mixture of other benzodiazepines or other drug classes with tetrazepam.

== Contraindications and special caution ==
Benzodiazepines require special precaution if used in the elderly, during pregnancy, in children, alcohol or drug-dependent individuals and individuals with comorbid psychiatric disorders.

== Pharmacology ==
Tetrazepam is an unusual benzodiazepine in its molecular structure as it has cyclohexenyl group which has substituted the typical 5-phenyl moiety seen in other benzodiazepines. Tetrazepam, is rapidly absorbed after oral administration, within 45 mins and reaches peak plasma levels in less than 2 hours. It is classed as an intermediate acting benzodiazepine with an elimination half-life of approximately 15 hours. It is primarily metabolised to the inactive metabolites 3-hydroxy-tetrazepam and nortetrazepam. The pharmacological effects of tetrazepam are significantly less potent when compared against diazepam, in animal studies. Tetrazepam is a benzodiazepine site agonist and binds unselectively to type 1 and type 2 benzodiazepine site types as well as to peripheral benzodiazepine receptors. The muscle relaxant properties of tetrazepam are most likely due to a reduction of calcium influx. Small amounts of diazepam as well as the active metabolites of diazepam are produced from metabolism of tetrazepam. The metabolism of tetrazepam has led to false accusations of prisoners prescribed tetrazepam of taking illicit diazepam; this can lead to increased prison sentences for prisoners.

== Abuse ==
Tetrazepam as with other benzodiazepines is sometimes abused. It is sometimes abused to incapacitate a victim in order to carry out a drug-facilitated crime. or abused in order to achieve a state of intoxication. Tetrazepam's abuse for to carry out drug facilitated crimes may be less however, than other benzodiazepines due to its reduced hypnotic properties.

== See also ==
- Benzodiazepine
- Long-term effects of benzodiazepines
