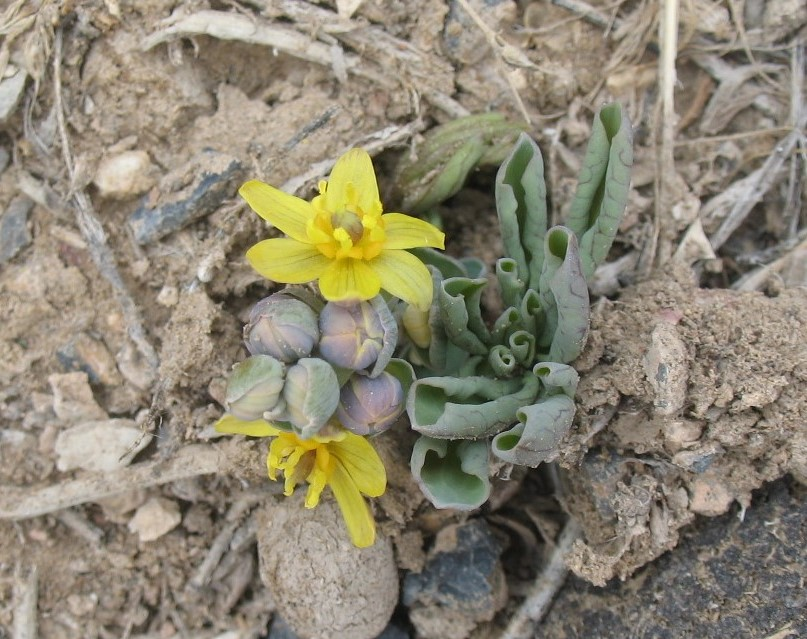
- Leontice incerta in the Kyzylkum Desert, Uzbekistan

Scientific classification
- Kingdom: Plantae
- Clade: Tracheophytes
- Clade: Angiosperms
- Clade: Eudicots
- Order: Ranunculales
- Family: Berberidaceae
- Genus: Leontice
- Species: L. incerta

Binomial name
- Leontice incerta Pallas, 1776

Synonyms
- Leontice vesicaria Willdenow

= Leontice incerta =

Species of plant

Leontice incerta is a perennial herbaceous plant of the family Berberidaceae. It was first described by Peter Simon Pallas in 1776 from specimens collected near Lake Inder in present-day Kazakhstan. The species is distributed across the northern deserts of Central Asia, where it is adapted to arid environments and sandy or clay-rich soils. Leontice incerta is notable for its bladder-like inflated fruits and its early spring flowering period, which coincides with favorable moisture conditions in its desert habitat.

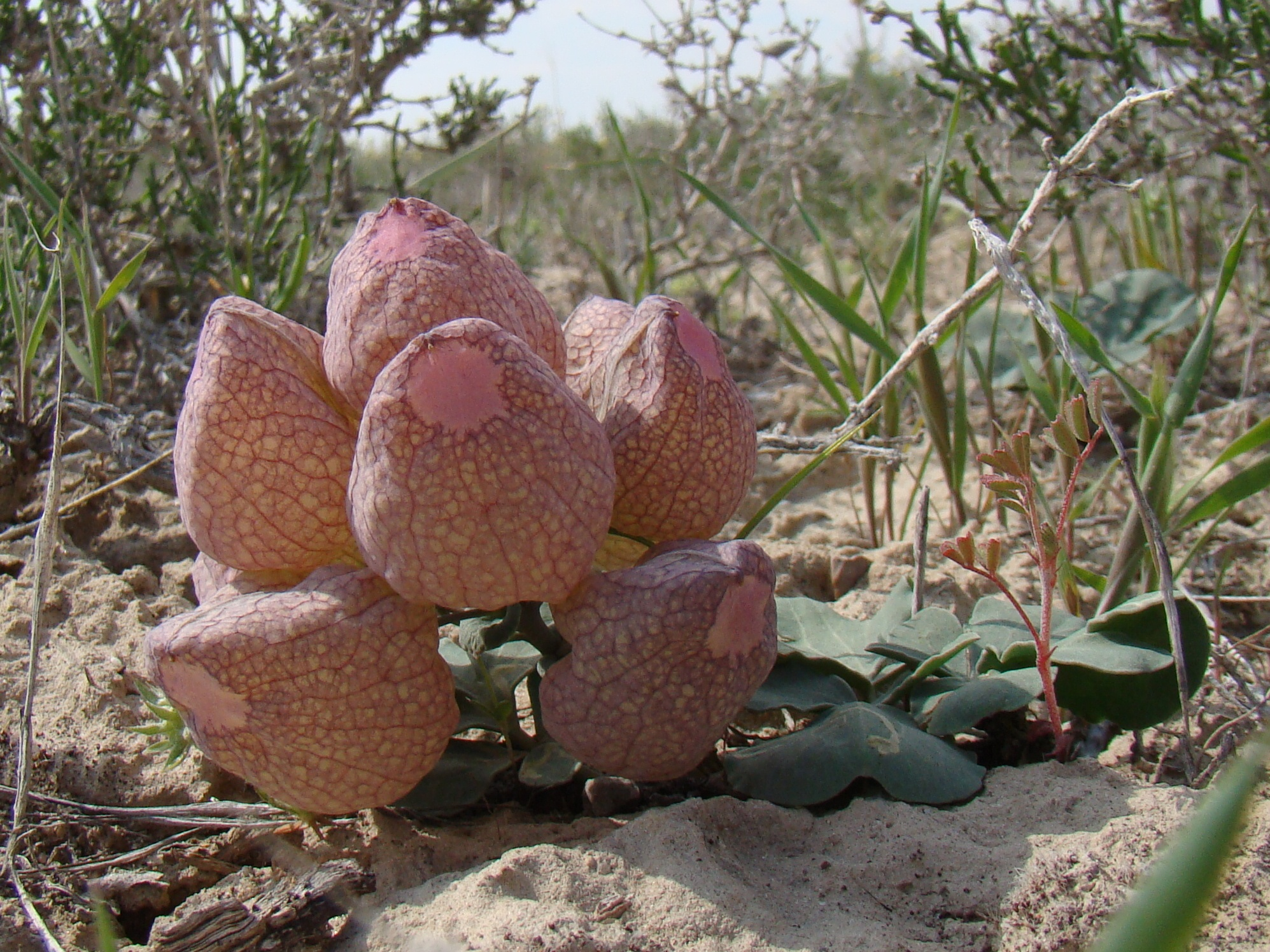
Leontice incerta is notable for its bladder-like inflated fruits

== Etymology ==
The generic name Leontice is derived from the Greek word for lion, referring to the deeply divided leaves that resemble a lion's paw.

== Description ==
Leontice incerta is a low-growing plant reaching a height of 10–20 cm. It develops from a nearly spherical tuber measuring 1.5–5 cm in diameter. The stems are erect, unbranched, and cylindrical, often shiny at the base. Plants typically produce two cauline leaves on petioles 2.5–5 cm long. The leaves are pinnately or twice pinnately divided, with elliptic to obovate lobes measuring 1.3–3.2 cm long and 6–20 mm wide. The lobes are entire-margined, somewhat fleshy, and occasionally further divided.

The inflorescence is a terminal raceme 4–6 cm long, bearing 5–10 flowers. Each flower is subtended by a rounded bract and borne on a slender pedicel up to 1.2 cm long. The sepals are elliptic or ovate, 5–7 mm long, yellow with purplish spotting on the outer surface, and 4–5 times longer than the small, kidney-shaped petals. The petals have an indistinctly toothed upper margin and are narrowed at the base into a short claw. The pistil has a very short style and a nearly sessile stigma. The fruit is a large, nearly spherical bladder-like achene, 2.5–4.5 cm in diameter, inflated, pale purple in the upper part, and indehiscent. Each fruit contains 2–6 dark brown seeds.

== Distribution and habitat ==
Leontice incerta is native to the northern deserts of Central Asia, including Kazakhstan, Kirgizstan, Tadzhikistan, Uzbekistan, and western China (Xinjiang). It grows on clay or sandy soils in deserts and semi-deserts, on hill slopes, and within Haloxylon forests at altitudes of around 600 m.

== Biology ==
The species flowers and fruits early in the growing season, with flowering occurring in March and April and fruiting in April and May. This phenology allows the plant to complete its reproductive cycle before the onset of the intense summer drought typical of its desert habitat. The bladder-like fruits are indehiscent and adapted for seed protection and dispersal in arid conditions.

== Conservation status ==
Leontice incerta has a restricted distribution in the deserts of Central Asia, but there is currently no evidence that its populations are in significant decline. It is locally common in suitable habitats. As of now, the species has not been assessed for the IUCN Red List. Some studies demonstrated that there is increasing risk of population decline in L.incerta caused by regular recent droughts.
