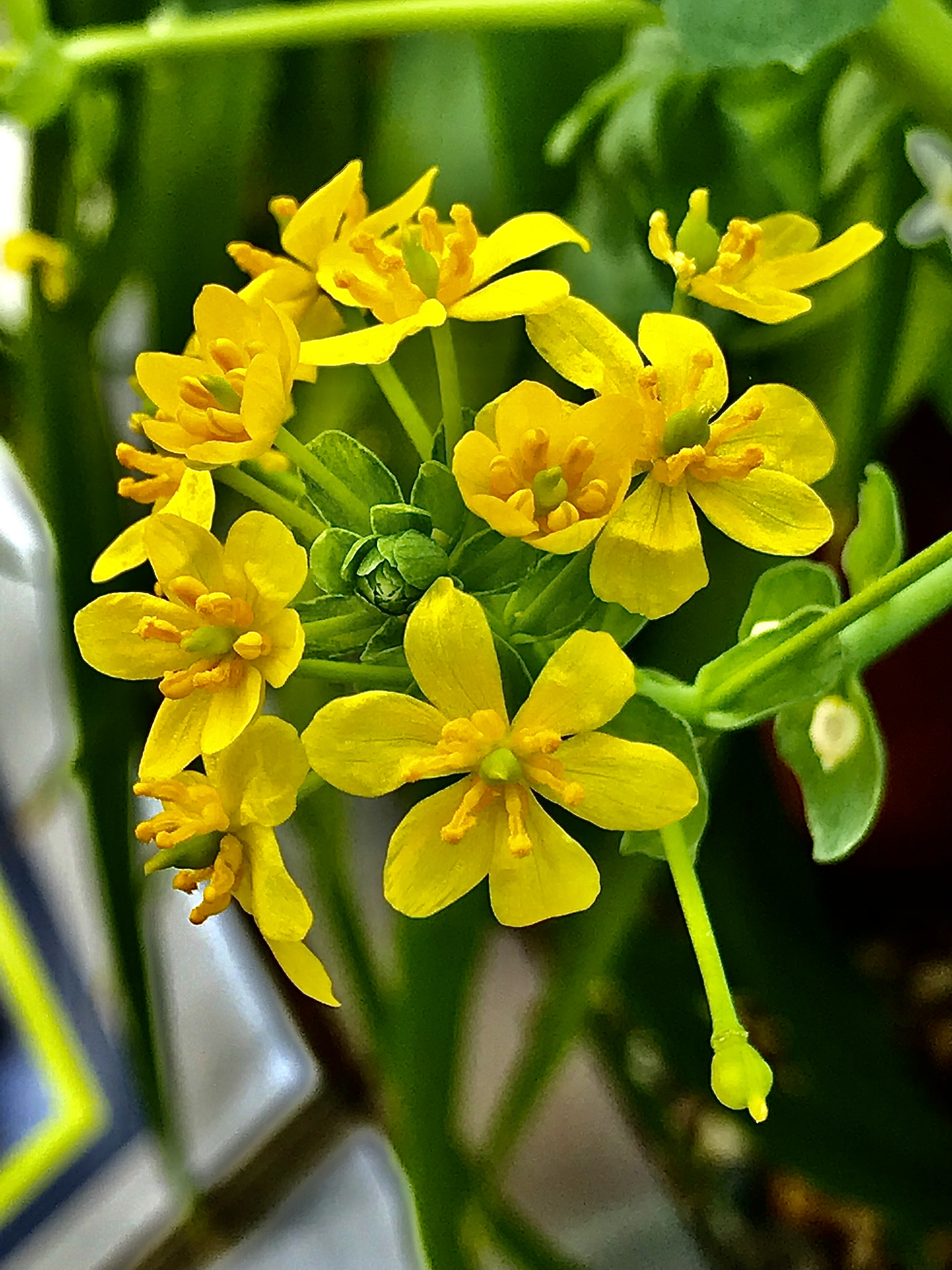
- Inflorescence of Leontice leontopetalum

Scientific classification
- Kingdom: Plantae
- Clade: Tracheophytes
- Clade: Angiosperms
- Clade: Eudicots
- Order: Ranunculales
- Family: Berberidaceae
- Genus: Leontice
- Species: L. leontopetalum

Binomial name
- Leontice leontopetalum L.

Synonyms
- Leontice brevibracteata St.-Lag.

= Leontice leontopetalum =

Species of plant

Leontice leontopetalum, commonly known as leontice, lion's foot, lion's turnip, and lion's leaf, is a perennial geophyte having a wide distribution, and growing primarily in semi-desert regions. The name "lion's foot" is derived from the Greek λεοντοπέταλη [= "lioness"] in reference to a fancied resemblance between the shape of the leaves and the pads of a lioness’s paw.

== Description ==
Leontice leontopetalum is a perennial plant growing to a height of 15–60 cm. and bearing a profuse yellow inflorescence shaped like a ball or a pyramid. Its flowers bloom between February and April, usually after the winter rains. The plant contains saponins in all its parts. The tuberous root of the plant grows deep in the earth and resembles a large potato. Some scholars have noted that the plant's tuber naturally lies deep in the soil, as much as 50 cm, affording protection from the Arab plough.

The leaves of leontice are concentrated at the base of the plant, rising-up directly from the tuberous root, and are folded into large leaflets covered with a wax-like covering. The flowers are wide open and are made up of 6 yellow sepals that look like petals. The red swollen fruits are spread far and wide by the dry inflorescence that detaches from the ground and is blown by the wind.

== Distribution and habitat ==
Leontice leontopetalum is mostly found growing in North Africa, the eastern regions of Greece, Southern Bulgaria, and in the Near Eastern deserts, endemic to such regions as the Negev in Israel, as well as in semi-dry regions stretching across Armenia, Turkey, Northern Iran, and W. Pakistan. The plant grows in open-landscapes, in heavy and deep clay soils, in altitudes ranging from 300 metres (980 ft)–1,100 metres (3,600 ft), as well as in valleys and washes where there is an abundance of loess and alluvial soils.

Leontice leontopetalum has been included in the Red Data Book of rare and threatened plants of Greece (RDB 2009), with the designation (VU) i.e. "vulnerable".

== Uses ==
The tuberous roots of the leontice have been used by locals as soap to remove stains from clothing, especially from cashmere wool. Ibn al-Baytar does not distinguish, but says that the plant was used, in general, to cleanse woollen garments. The plant also has medicinal uses. In Turkey, the root of Leontice leontopetalum has traditionally been used as an antidote to opium overdose, which root they call aslab. Some scholars have speculated that the plant may have been the ashlag (Hebrew: אשלג) described in the Mishnah (Shabbat 9:5; Niddah 9:6), used as a cleansing substance, owing to its similarity to the Arabic name used for the same plant, and which language is believed to be a cognate of Hebrew.

Bongardia chrysogonum ( Hebrew: כַּרְבֻּלְתַּן הַשָּׂדוֹת: Karbulatan of the fields) is a related plant, with similar flowers but very different foliage, and is thought to be similar in its properties.

== Gallery ==
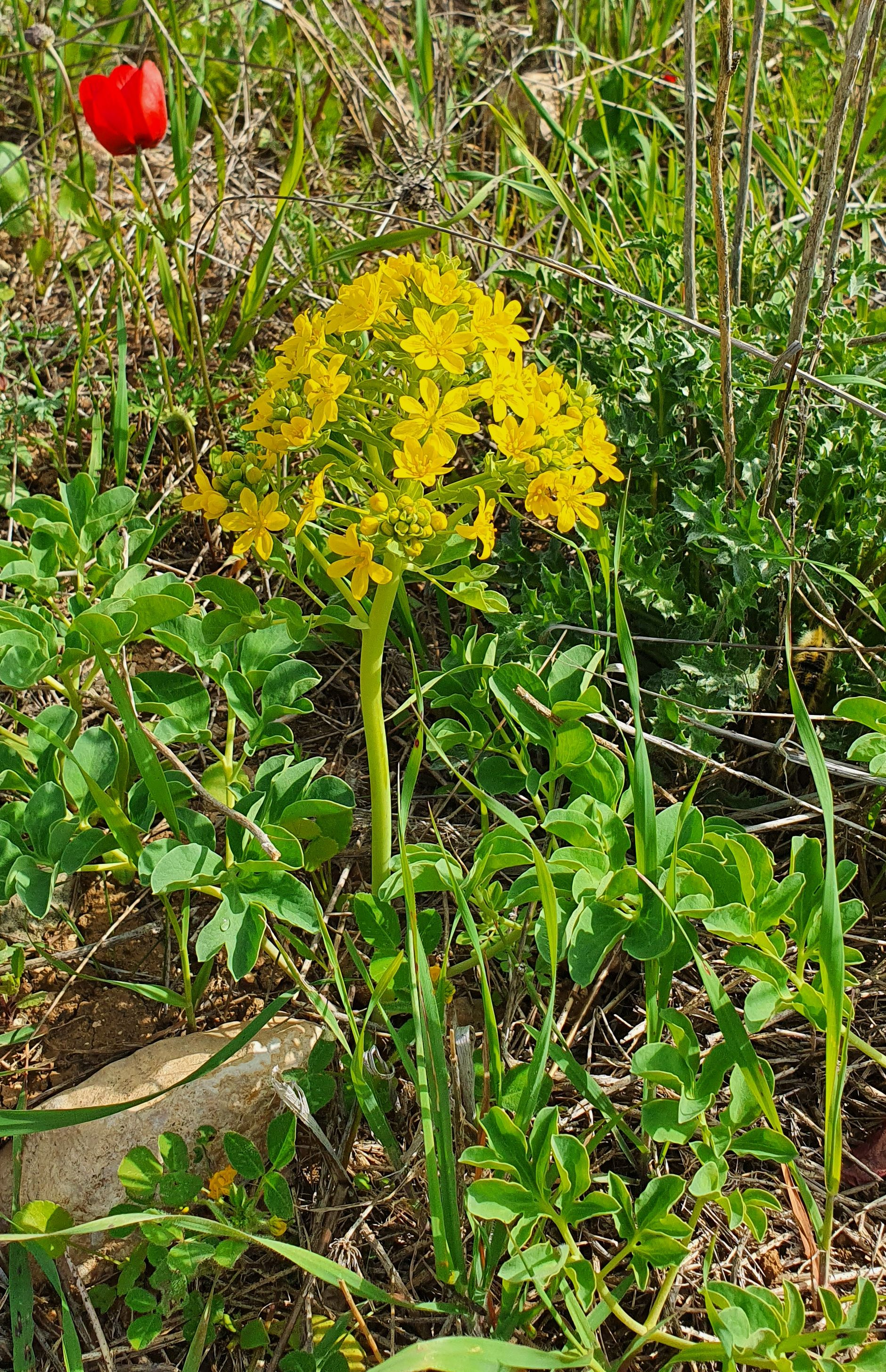
Wild plant in flower, Israel

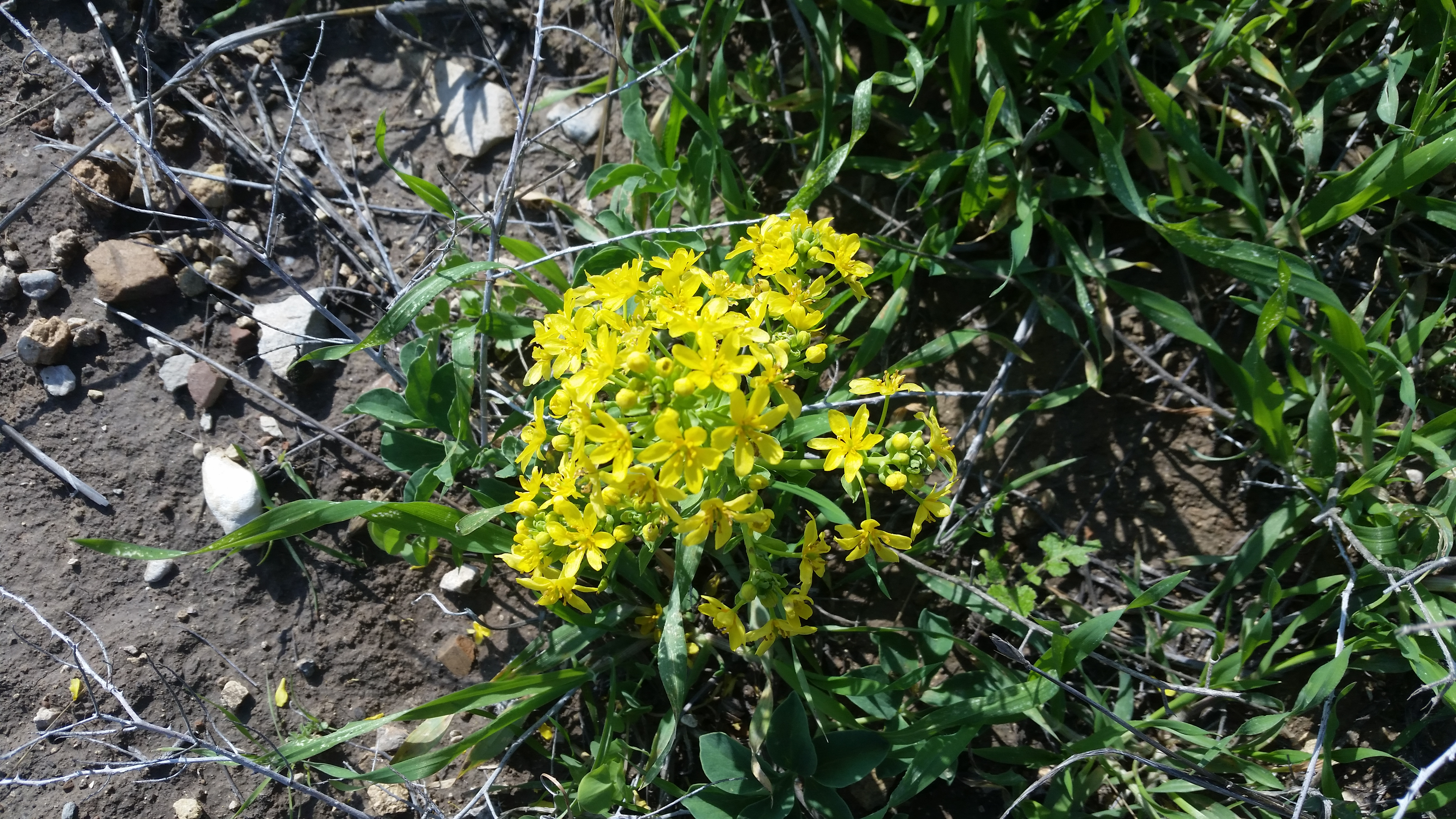
Arable weed, Tel Lakish, Israel. Hebrew common name: (השדות) ערטנית: Ertanit (of the fields)

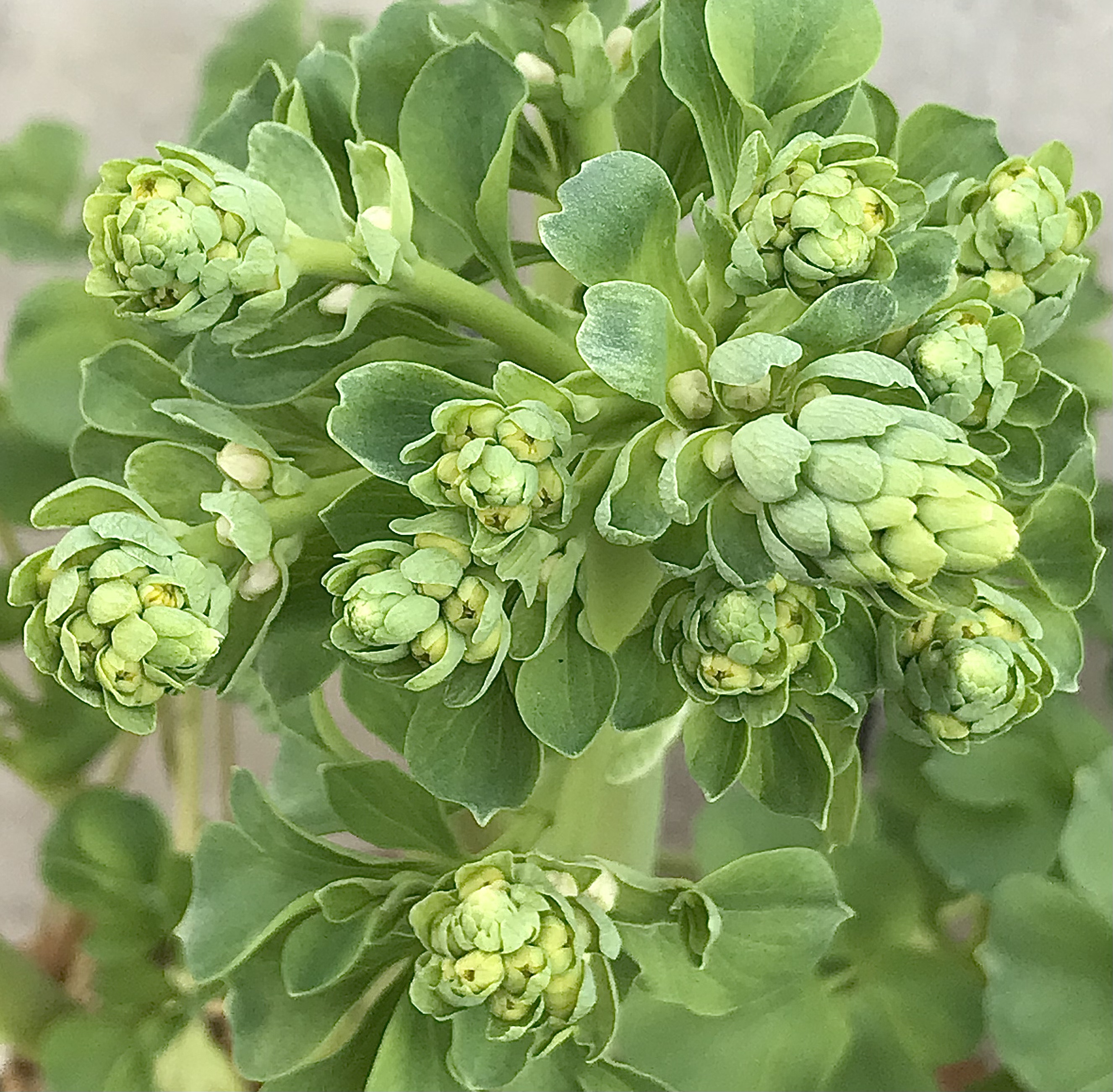
Developing inflorescence, showing glaucous, pinecone-like clusters of buds and bracts, Kew Gardens

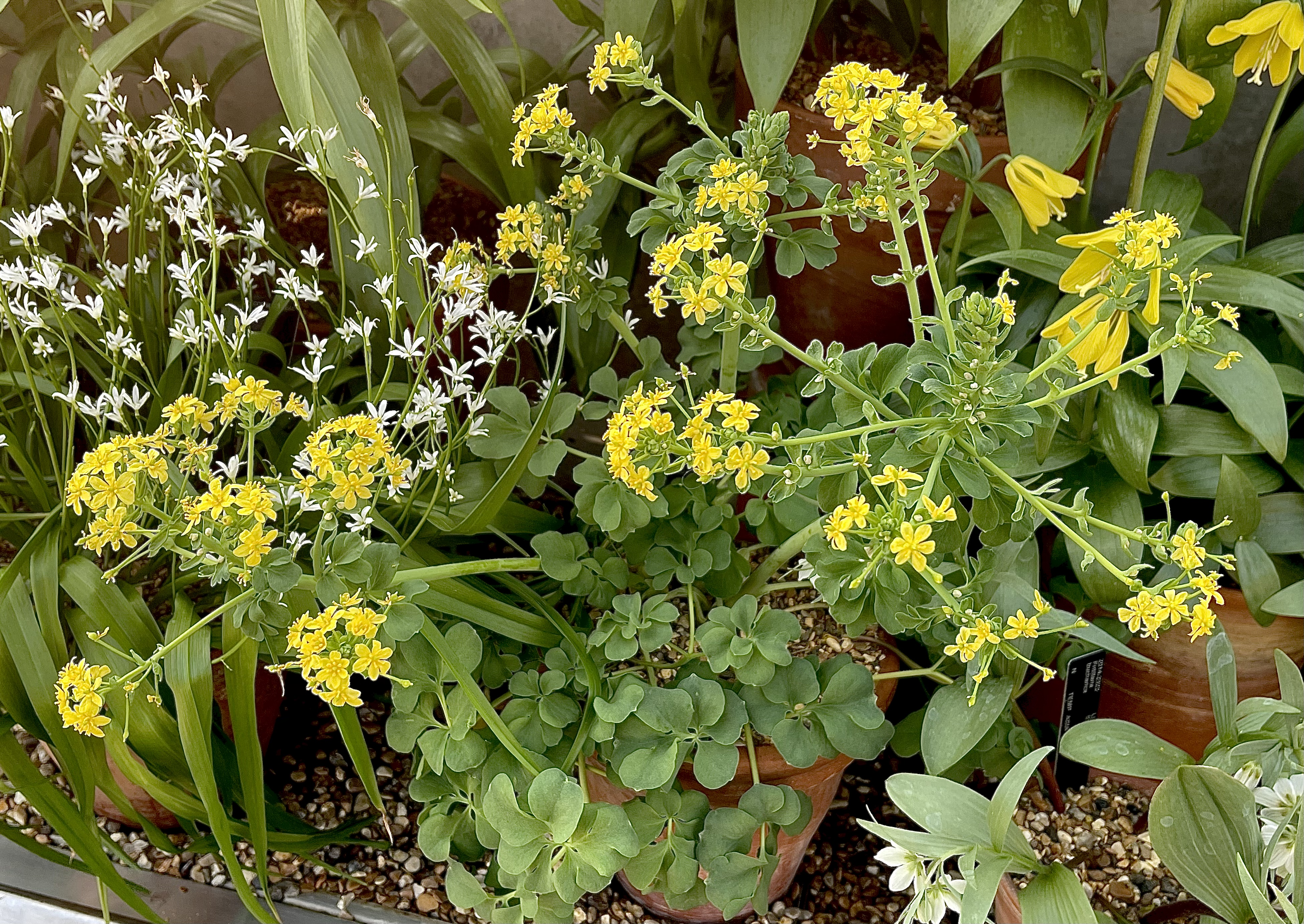
Container plant, alpine house, Kew Gardens

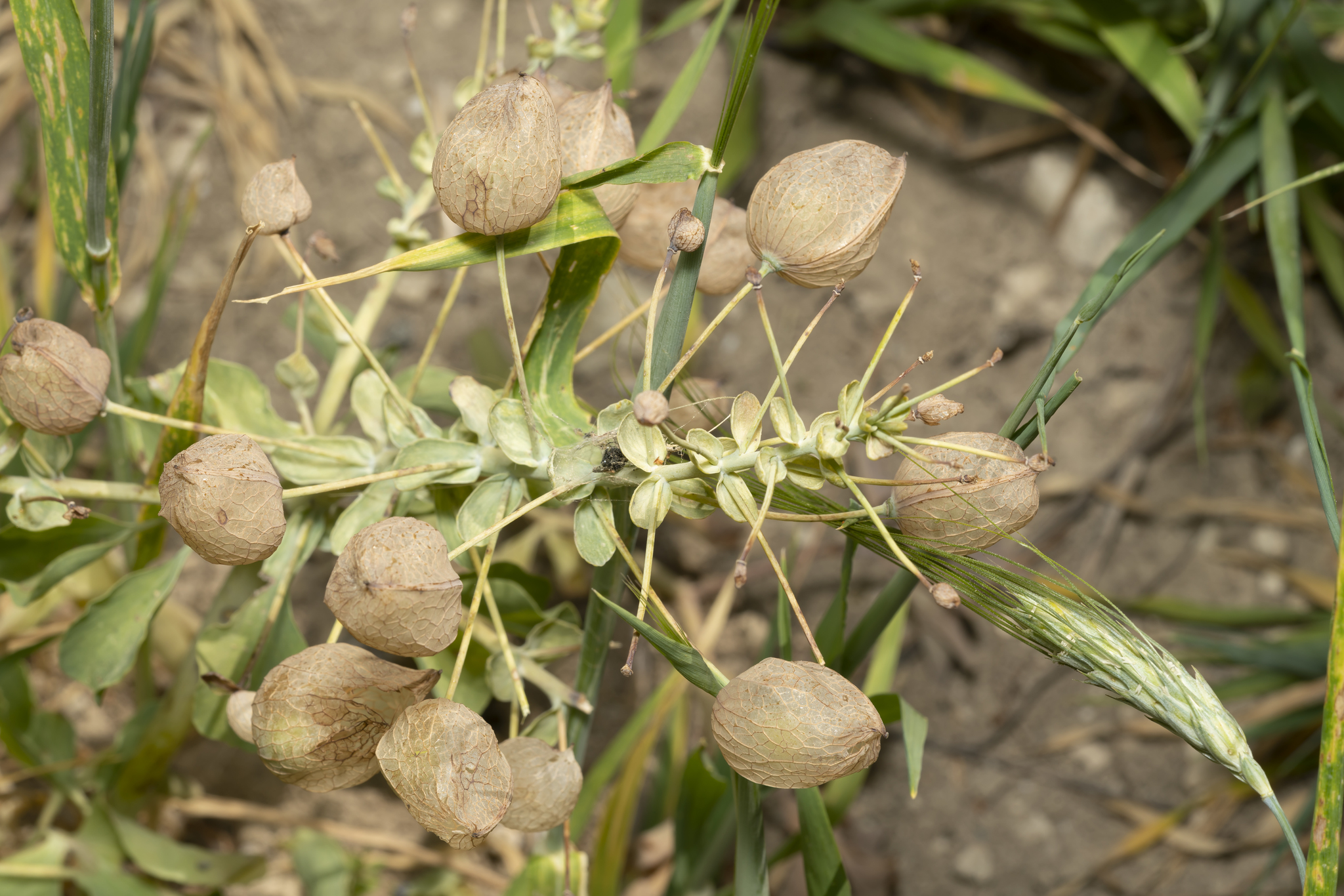
Ripe, bladder-like fruits ready for wind-dispersal, Greece
