= Hexafluronium bromide =

Pharmaceutical drug

Hexafluronium

Clinical data
- ATC code: M03AC05 (WHO)

Identifiers
- IUPAC name: N,N-di-9H-fluoren-9-yl-N,N,N',N'-tetramethylhexane-1,6-diaminium dibromide
- CAS Number: 317-52-2
- PubChem CID: 9434
- DrugBank: DB00941
- ChemSpider: 9063
- UNII: B64NJG83K2
- KEGG: D04435
- CompTox Dashboard (EPA): DTXSID6048753
- ECHA InfoCard: 100.005.697

Chemical and physical data
- Formula: C_{36}H_{42}Br_{2}N_{2}
- Molar mass: 662.554 g·mol^{−1}
- 3D model (JSmol): Interactive image
- SMILES: [Br-].[Br-].c1cccc3c1c2c(cccc2)C3[N+](CCCCCC[N+](C6c4ccccc4c5ccccc56)(C)C)(C)C
- InChI: InChI=1S/C36H42N2.2BrH/c1-37(2,35-31-21-11-7-17-27(31)28-18-8-12-22-32(28)35)25-15-5-6-16-26-38(3,4)36-33-23-13-9-19-29(33)30-20-10-14-24-34(30)36;;/h7-14,17-24,35-36H,5-6,15-16,25-26H2,1-4H3;2*1H/q+2;;/p-2; Key:WDEFPRUEZRUYNW-UHFFFAOYSA-L

Hexafluronium (or hexafluorenium) is a muscle relaxant. It acts as a nicotinic acetylcholine receptor antagonist.
