= Nortetrazepam =

Chemical compound

Identifiers
- IUPAC name: 7-chloro-5-(1-cyclohexen-1-yl)-1,3-dilhydro-2H-1,4-benzodiazepin-2-one
- CAS Number: 10379-11-0
- PubChem CID: 166581
- ChemSpider: 145774
- UNII: PWL441R6EQ
- ChEMBL: ChEMBL2105147
- CompTox Dashboard (EPA): DTXSID40146057

Chemical and physical data
- Formula: C_{15}H_{15}ClN_{2}O
- Molar mass: 274.75 g·mol^{−1}
- 3D model (JSmol): Interactive image
- SMILES: O=C1CN=C(C(C=C(Cl)C=C2)=C2N1)C3=CCCCC3
- InChI: InChI=1S/C15H15ClN2O/c16-11-6-7-13-12(8-11)15(17-9-14(19)18-13)10-4-2-1-3-5-10/h4,6-8H,1-3,5,9H2,(H,18,19); Key:FDRMSENAXZDFTN-UHFFFAOYSA-N

Nortetrazepam is a drug which is a benzodiazepine derivative. It is one of the major metabolites of tetrazepam.

== See also ==
- Benzodiazepine
