= Petaline =

Petaline is a quaternary alkaloid that is obtained from the Lebanese plant Leontice leontopetalum (Family: Berberidaceae).
