= Fenyramidol =

Muscle relaxant drug

Clinical data
- Trade names: Cabral
- AHFS/Drugs.com: International Drug Names
- ATC code: M03BX30 (WHO)

Identifiers
- IUPAC name: 1-phenyl-2-(pyridin-2-ylamino)ethanol
- CAS Number: 553-69-5
- PubChem CID: 9470
- ChemSpider: 9098
- UNII: R3V02WL7O3
- ChEMBL: ChEMBL1697767
- CompTox Dashboard (EPA): DTXSID00862185
- ECHA InfoCard: 100.008.223

Chemical and physical data
- Formula: C_{13}H_{14}N_{2}O
- Molar mass: 214.268 g·mol^{−1}
- 3D model (JSmol): Interactive image
- SMILES: C1=CC=CC(=C1)C(CNC2=NC=CC=C2)O
- InChI: InChI=1S/C13H14N2O/c16-12(11-6-2-1-3-7-11)10-15-13-8-4-5-9-14-13/h1-9,12,16H,10H2,(H,14,15); Key:ZEAJXCPGHPJVNP-UHFFFAOYSA-N

Fenyramidol (INN) or phenyramidol (BAN, USAN), trade name Cabral, is a pharmaceutical drug which acts as a muscle relaxant.

== Drug Interactions ==
Fenyramidol inhibits the metabolism of phenytoin, leading to possible increases in plasma phenytoin levels.
