= ATC code M03 =

ATC code M03 Muscle relaxants is a therapeutic subgroup of the Anatomical Therapeutic Chemical Classification System, a system of alphanumeric codes developed by the World Health Organization (WHO) for the classification of drugs and other medical products. Subgroup M03 is part of the anatomical group M Musculo-skeletal system.

Codes for veterinary use (ATCvet codes) can be created by placing the letter Q in front of the human ATC code: for example, QM03. ATCvet codes without corresponding human ATC codes are cited with the leading Q in the following list.
National versions of the ATC classification may include additional codes not present in this list, which follows the WHO version.

== M03A Muscle relaxants, peripherally acting agents ==
=== M03AA Curare alkaloids ===
M03AA01 Alcuronium
M03AA02 Tubocurarine
M03AA04 Dimethyltubocurarine

=== M03AB Choline derivatives ===
M03AB01 Suxamethonium

=== M03AC Other quaternary ammonium compounds ===
M03AC01 Pancuronium
M03AC02 Gallamine
M03AC03 Vecuronium
M03AC04 Atracurium
M03AC05 Hexafluronium
M03AC06 Pipecuronium bromide
M03AC07 Doxacurium chloride
M03AC08 Fazadinium bromide
M03AC09 Rocuronium bromide
M03AC10 Mivacurium chloride
M03AC11 Cisatracurium

=== M03AX Other muscle relaxants, peripherally acting agents ===
M03AX01 Botulinum toxin

== M03B Muscle relaxants, centrally acting agents ==
=== M03BA Carbamic acid esters ===
M03BA01 Phenprobamate
M03BA02 Carisoprodol
M03BA03 Methocarbamol
M03BA04 Styramate
M03BA05 Febarbamate
M03BA51 Phenprobamate, combinations excluding psycholeptics
M03BA52 Carisoprodol, combinations excluding psycholeptics
M03BA53 Methocarbamol, combinations excluding psycholeptics
M03BA71 Phenprobamate, combinations with psycholeptics
M03BA72 Carisoprodol, combinations with psycholeptics
M03BA73 Methocarbamol, combinations with psycholeptics
QM03BA99 Combinations

=== M03BB Oxazol, thiazine, and triazine derivatives ===
M03BB02 Chlormezanone
M03BB03 Chlorzoxazone
M03BB52 Chlormezanone, combinations excluding psycholeptics
M03BB53 Chlorzoxazone, combinations excluding psycholeptics
M03BB72 Chlormezanone, combinations with psycholeptics
M03BB73 Chlorzoxazone, combinations with psycholeptics

=== M03BC Ethers, chemically close to antihistamines ===
M03BC01 Orphenadrine (citrate)
M03BC51 Orphenadrine, combinations

=== M03BX Other centrally acting agents ===
M03BX01 Baclofen
M03BX02 Tizanidine
M03BX03 Pridinol
M03BX04 Tolperisone
M03BX05 Thiocolchicoside
M03BX06 Mephenesin
M03BX07 Tetrazepam
M03BX08 Cyclobenzaprine
M03BX09 Eperisone
M03BX30 Phenyramidol
M03BX53 Pridinol, combinations
M03BX55 Thiocolchicoside, combinations
QM03BX90 Guaifenesin

== M03C Muscle relaxants, directly acting agents ==
=== M03CA Dantrolene and derivatives ===
M03CA01 Dantrolene
