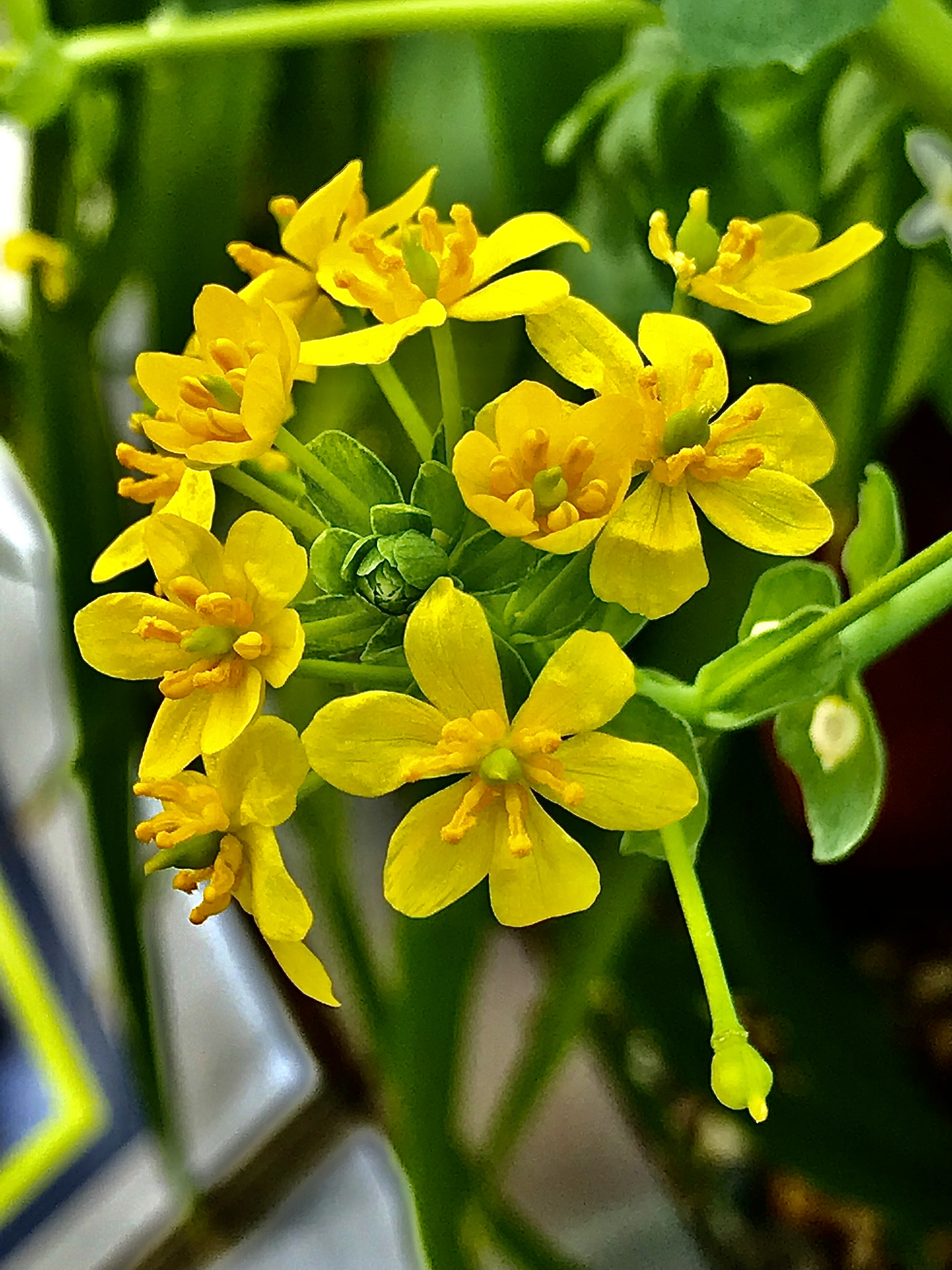
- Leontice leontopetalum Alpine House, Kew Gardens

Scientific classification
- Kingdom: Plantae
- Clade: Tracheophytes
- Clade: Angiosperms
- Clade: Eudicots
- Order: Ranunculales
- Family: Berberidaceae
- Genus: Leontice; L.

Type species
- Leontice leontopetalum L.

Synonyms
- Leontopetalon Miller.

= Leontice =

Genus of flowering plants belonging to the barberry family

Leontice is a group of perennial, tuberous herbs in the family Berberidaceae, first described as a genus by Linnaeus in 1753.

== Species ==
As of November 2022, Plants of the World Online accepted four species:

- Leontice armeniaca Belanger - Armenia, Turkey, Syria, Lebanon
- Leontice ewersmanni Bunge - Central Asia
- Leontice incerta Pall.- Xinjiang, Kazakhstan
- Leontice leontopetalum L. - eastern Mediterranean to Central Asia

== Gallery ==
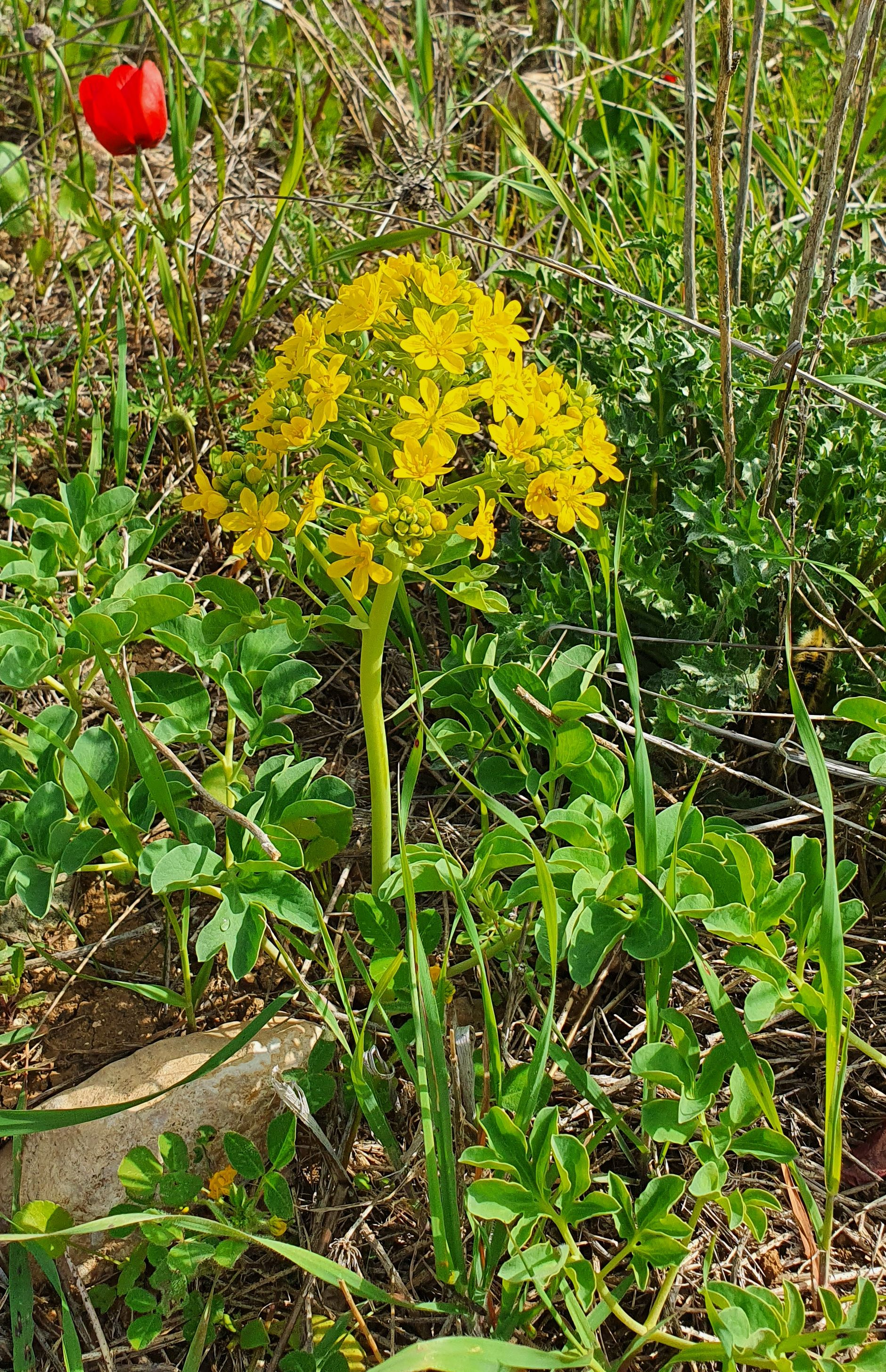
L. leontopetalum in flower, Israel

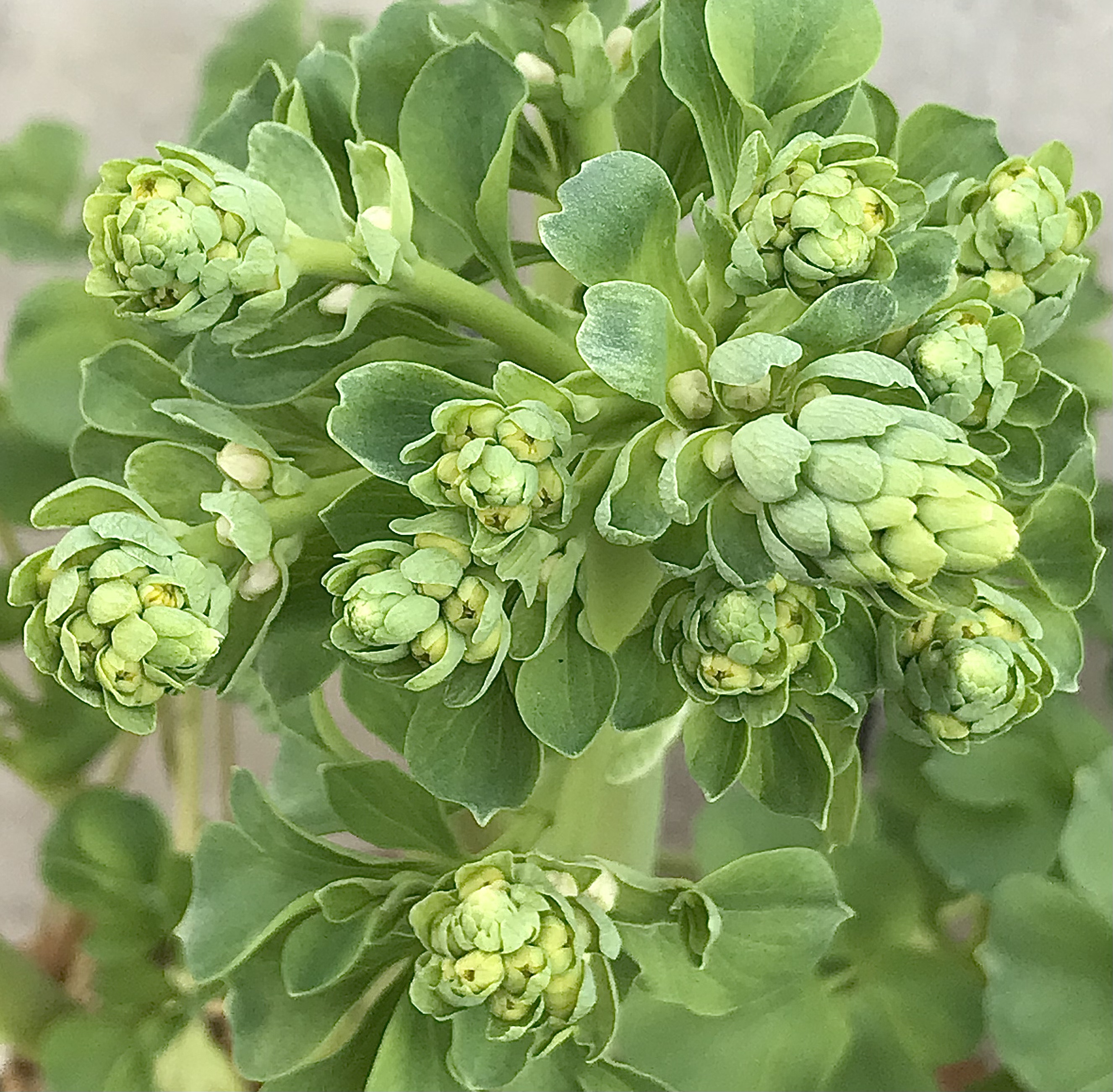
L. leontopetalum: developing inflorescence, Kew Gardens

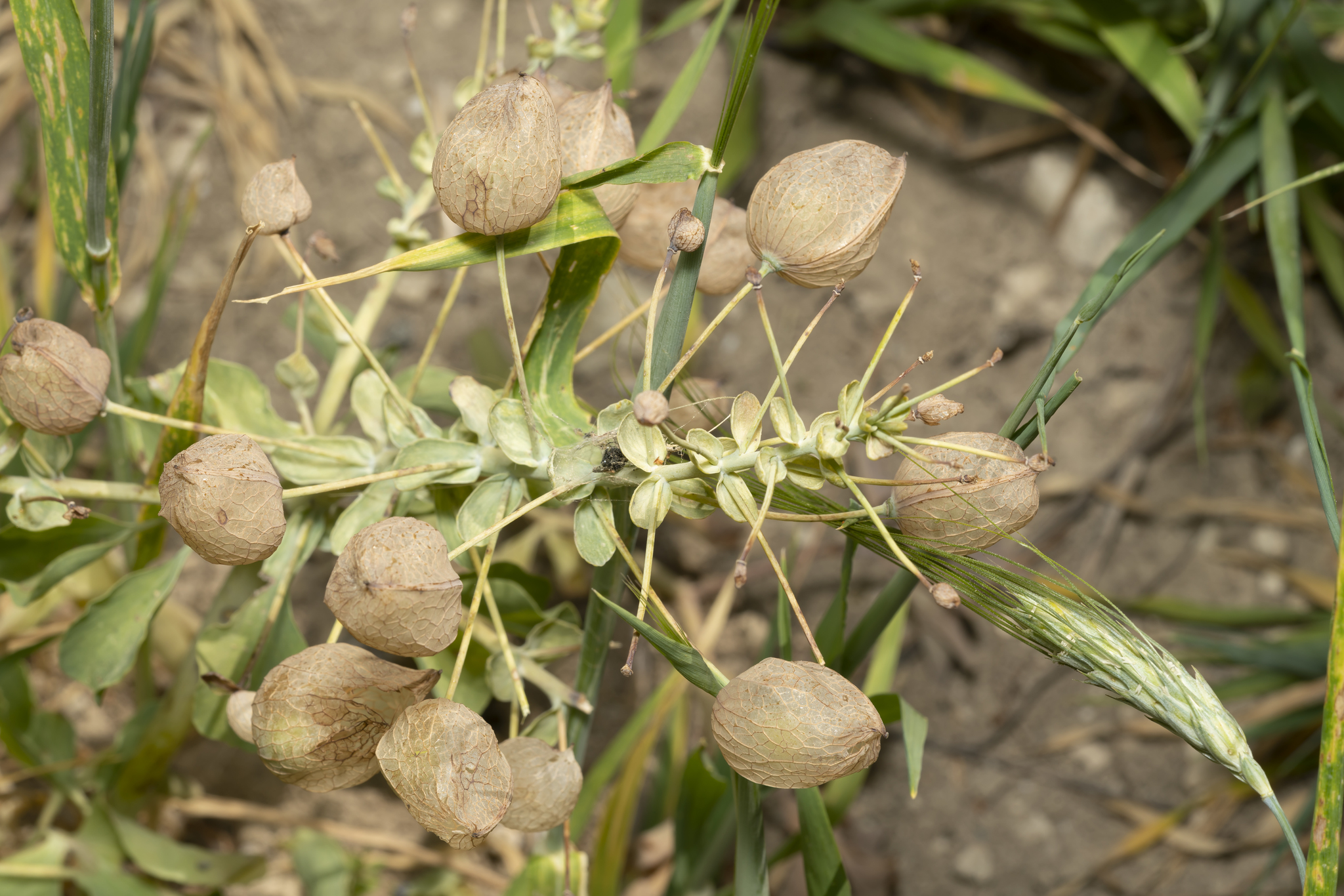
Ripe, bladder-like fruits of L. leontopetalum, Greece

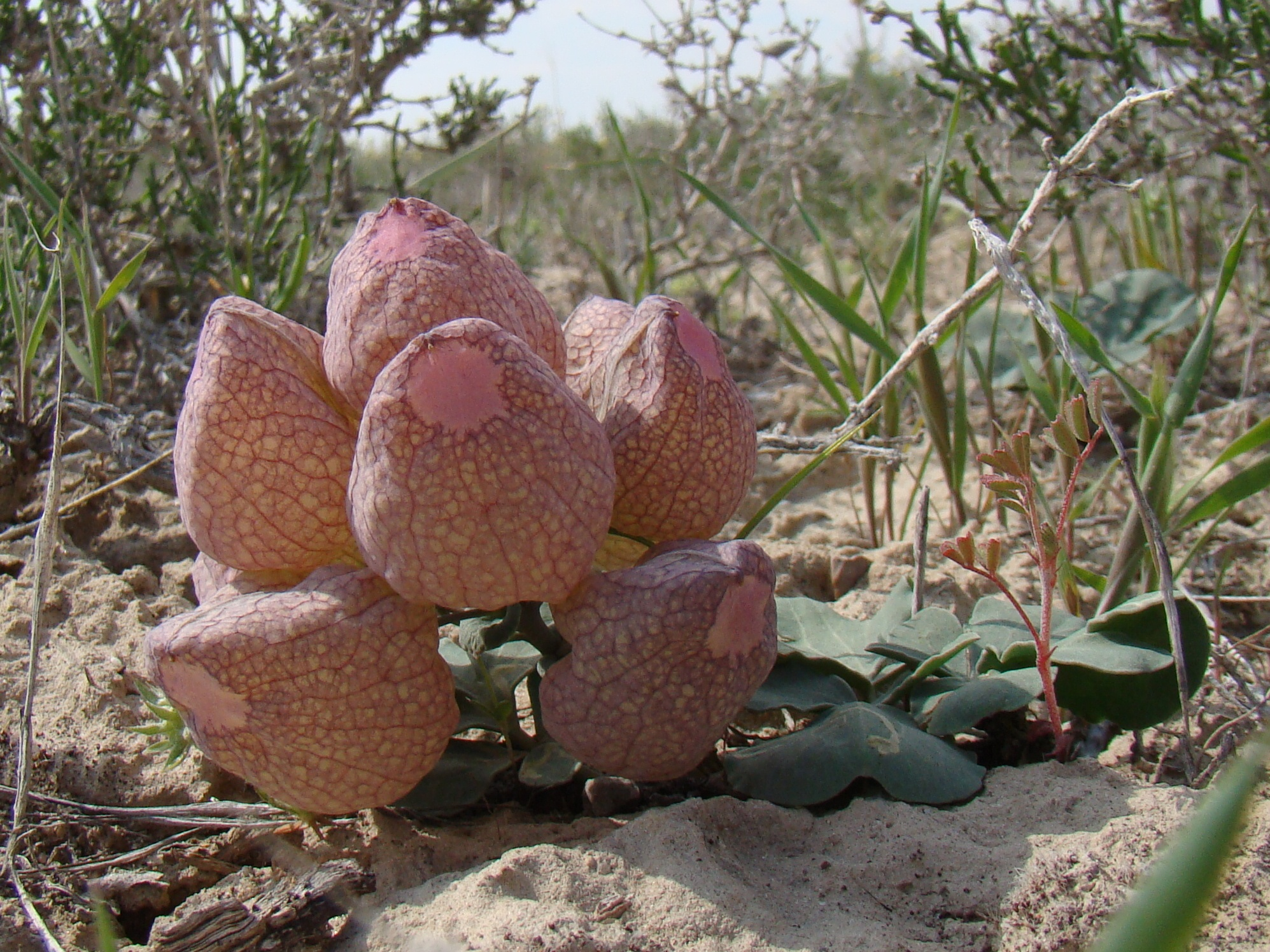
Bladder-like fruits of L. incerta, Baikonur, Kazakhstan
