= Cisatracurium besilate =

Chemical compound

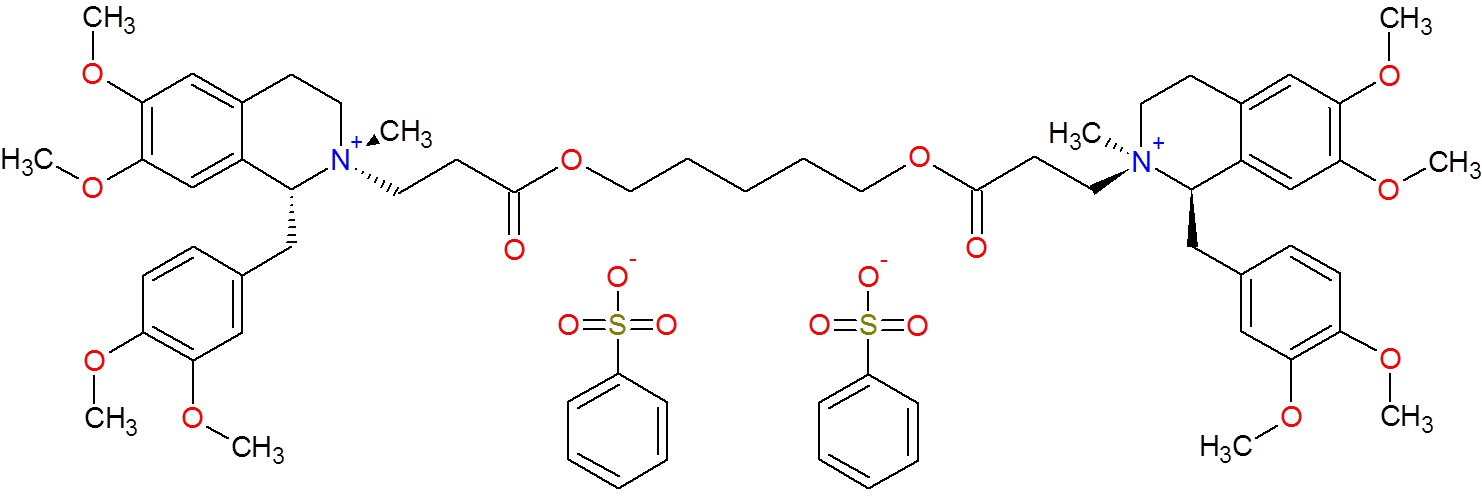

Clinical data
- Trade names: Nimbex
- Other names: 51W89, cisatracurium besylate (USAN US)
- AHFS/Drugs.com: Monograph
- License data: US DailyMed: Cisatracurium_besylate
- Pregnancy category: AU: C
- Routes of administration: Intravenous
- ATC code: M03AC11 (WHO)

Legal status
- Legal status: AU: S4 (Prescription only); CA: ℞-only; UK: POM (Prescription only); US: ℞-only; In general: ℞ (Prescription only)

Pharmacokinetic data
- Bioavailability: 100% (IV)
- Metabolism: 80% Hofmann degradation/ liver
- Elimination half-life: 20–29 minutes
- Excretion: 10-15% unchanged

Identifiers
- IUPAC name: 5-[3-[(1R,2R)-1-[(3,4-Dimethoxyphenyl)methyl]-6,7-dimethoxy-2-methyl-3,4-dihydro-1H-isoquinolin-2-yl]propanoyloxy]pentyl 3-[(1R,2R)-1-[(3,4-dimethoxyphenyl)methyl]-6,7-dimethoxy-2-methyl-3,4-dihydro-1H-isoquinolin-2-yl]propanoate benzenesulfonate (1:2)
- CAS Number: 96946-42-8; 96946-41-7
- PubChem CID: 62886; 62887
- DrugBank: DBSALT002671; DB00565
- ChemSpider: 56614; 56615
- UNII: 80YS8O1MBS; QX62KLI41N
- KEGG: D00759
- ChEBI: CHEBI:3721; CHEBI:140621
- ChEMBL: ChEMBL1200641; ChEMBL1201248
- CompTox Dashboard (EPA): DTXSID10895045
- ECHA InfoCard: 100.149.509

Chemical and physical data
- Formula: C_{65}H_{82}N_{2}O_{18}S_{2}
- Molar mass: 1243.49 g·mol^{−1}
- 3D model (JSmol): Interactive image
- SMILES: [O-]S(=O)(=O)c1ccccc1.[O-]S(=O)(=O)c1ccccc1.O=C(OCCCCCOC(=O)CC[N@@+]2([C@@H](c1c(cc(OC)c(OC)c1)CC2)Cc3ccc(OC)c(OC)c3)C)CC[N@+]5(C)[C@@H](c4cc(OC)c(OC)cc4CC5)Cc6ccc(OC)c(OC)c6
- InChI: InChI=1S/C53H72N2O12.2C6H6O3S/c1-54(22-18-38-32-48(62-7)50(64-9)34-40(38)42(54)28-36-14-16-44(58-3)46(30-36)60-5)24-20-52(56)66-26-12-11-13-27-67-53(57)21-25-55(2)23-19-39-33-49(63-8)51(65-10)35-41(39)43(55)29-37-15-17-45(59-4)47(31-37)61-6;2*7-10(8,9)6-4-2-1-3-5-6/h14-17,30-35,42-43H,11-13,18-29H2,1-10H3;2*1-5H,(H,7,8,9)/q+2;;/p-2/t42-,43-,54-,55-;;/m1../s1; Key:XXZSQOVSEBAPGS-DONVQRBFSA-L

Cisatracurium besilate (INN; cisatracurium besylate (USAN); formerly recognized as 51W89; trade name Nimbex) is a bisbenzyltetrahydroisoquinolinium that has effect as a non-depolarizing neuromuscular-blocking drug, used adjunctively in anesthesia to facilitate endotracheal intubation and to provide skeletal muscle relaxation during surgery or mechanical ventilation. It shows intermediate duration of action. Cisatracurium is one of the ten isomers of the parent molecule, atracurium. Moreover, cisatracurium represents approximately 15% of the atracurium mixture.

== History ==
The generic name cisatracurium was conceived by scientists at Burroughs Wellcome Co. (now part of GlaxoSmithKline) by combining the name "atracurium" with "cis" [hence cisatracurium] because the molecule is one of the three cis-cis isomers comprising the ten isomers of the parent, atracurium. Atracurium itself was invented at Strathclyde University and licensed to Burroughs Wellcome Co., Research Triangle Park, NC, for further development and subsequent marketing as Tracrium. As the secondary pharmacology of atracurium was being developed, it became clear that the primary clinical disadvantage of atracurium was likely to be its propensity to elicit histamine release. To address this issue, a program was initiated to investigate the individual isomer constituents of atracurium to identify and isolate the isomer(s) associated with the undesirable histamine effects as well as identify the isomer that might possibly retain the desirable properties without the histamine release. Thus, in 1989, D A Hill and G L Turner, PhD (both chemists at Burroughs Wellcome Co., Dartford, UK) first synthesized cisatracurium as an individual isomer molecule. The pharmacological research of cisatracurium and the other individual isomers was then developed further primarily by R. Brandt Maehr and William B. Wastila, PhD (both of whom were pharmacologists within the Division of Pharmacology at Burroughs Wellcome Co.) in collaboration with John J. Savarese MD (who at the time was an anesthesiologist in the Dept. of Anesthesia, Harvard Medical School at the Massachusetts General Hospital, Boston, MA). Thereafter, the entire clinical development of cisatracurium was completed in a record short period from 1992 to 1994: the team of scientists was led by J. Neal Weakly PhD, Martha M. Abou-Donia PhD, and Steve Quessy PhD, in the Division of Clinical Neurosciences at Burroughs Wellcome Co., Research Triangle Park, NC. By the time of its approval for human use, in 1995, by the US Food and Drug Administration, Burroughs Wellcome Co. had merged with Glaxo Inc., and cisatracurium was approved to be marketed as Nimbex by GlaxoWellcome Inc. The trade name "Nimbex" was derived from inserting an "i" to the original proposal "Nmbex," which stood for excellent Neuromuscular blocker.

== Preclinical pharmacology ==
In vitro studies using human plasma indicated that cisatracurium spontaneously degrades at physiological pH via Hofmann elimination to yield laudanosine and the quaternary monoacrylate. Subsequent ester hydrolysis of the monoacrylate generates the monoquaternary alcohol, although the rate-limiting step is Hofmann elimination. In rat plasma, cisatracurium is also metabolized by non-specific carboxylesterases (a rate-limiting step) to the monoquaternary alcohol and the monoquaternary acid.

== Clinical pharmacology ==
As is evident with the parent molecule, atracurium, cisatracurium is also susceptible to degradation by Hofmann elimination and ester hydrolysis as components of the in vivo metabolic processes. See the atracurium page for information on Hofmann elimination in vivo versus the Hofmann degradation chemical reaction.

Because Hofmann elimination is a temperature- and plasma pH-dependent process, cisatracurium's rate of degradation in vivo is highly influenced by body pH and temperature just as it is with the parent molecule, atracurium: thus, an increase in body pH favors the elimination process, whereas a decrease in temperature slows down the process.

One of the metabolites of cisatracurium via Hofmann elimination is laudanosine – see the atracurium page for further discussion of the issue regarding this metabolite. 80% of cisatracurium is metabolized eventually to laudanosine and 20% is metabolized hepatically or excreted renally. 10-15% of the dose is excreted unchanged in the urine.

Since Hofmann elimination is an organ-independent chemodegradative mechanism, there is little or no risk to the use of cisatracurium in patients with liver or renal disease when compared with other neuromuscular-blocking agents.

The two reverse ester linkages in the bridge between the two isoquinolinium groups make atracurium and cisatracurium poor targets for plasma cholinesterase, unlike mivacurium which has two conventional ester linkages.

== Adverse effects ==
=== Bronchospasm – Pulmonary compliance ===
To date, cisatracurium has not been reported to elicit bronchospasm at doses that are clinically prescribed.

=== Laudanosine – Epileptic foci ===
Cisatracurium undergoes Hofmann elimination as a primary route of chemodegradation: consequently one of the metabolites from this process is laudanosine, a tertiary amino alkaloid reported to be a modest CNS stimulant with epileptogenic activity and cardiovascular effects such as low blood pressure and a slowed heart rate. As a tertiary amine, Laudanosine is unionised and readily crosses the blood–brain barrier. Presently, there is little evidence that laudanosine accumulation and related toxicity will likely ever be seen with the doses of cisatracurium that are administered in clinical practice especially given that the plasma concentrations of laudanosine generated are lower with cisatracurium than those seen with atracurium.

== Research ==
A recent study showed that cisatracurium pretreatment effectively decreases the incidence and severity of pain induced by propofol general anaesthesia. Another study showed that hiccups accompanied by vomiting, insomnia, shortness of breath can also be relieved by the nondepolarizing muscle relaxant, cisatracurium, during total intravenous anesthesia.

== Synthesis ==
Cisatracuronium synthesis:

Treatment of 1,5-Pentanediol with 3-bromopropionyl chloride gives the corresponding ester; dehydrohalogenation of the ester with triethylamine then gives the bis-acrylate (2). Reaction of that unsaturated ester with tetrahydropapaverine (3) leads to conjugate addition of the secondary amine and formation of the intermediate (4). Alkylation with methyl benzenesulfonate forms the bis-quaternary salt, affording cisatracuronium (5).
