= Inaperisone =

Muscle relaxant drug

Clinical data
- ATC code: None

Identifiers
- IUPAC name: 1-(4-Ethylphenyl)-2-methyl-3-(1-pyrrolidinyl)-1-propanone
- CAS Number: 99323-21-4
- PubChem CID: 65860
- ChemSpider: 59271
- UNII: 0QAC3P785O
- ChEMBL: ChEMBL1797127
- CompTox Dashboard (EPA): DTXSID60869332

Chemical and physical data
- Formula: C_{16}H_{23}NO
- Molar mass: 245.366 g·mol^{−1}
- 3D model (JSmol): Interactive image
- SMILES: CCC1=CC=C(C=C1)C(=O)C(C)CN2CCCC2
- InChI: InChI=1S/C16H23NO/c1-3-14-6-8-15(9-7-14)16(18)13(2)12-17-10-4-5-11-17/h6-9,13H,3-5,10-12H2,1-2H3; Key:VNFAARJCGSAROU-UHFFFAOYSA-N

Inaperisone (INN) is a muscle relaxant.

== See also ==
Chemically and mechanistically related drugs:

- Eperisone
- Lanperisone
- Silperisone
- Tolperisone
