= Eperisone =

Antispasmodic and muscle relaxant drug

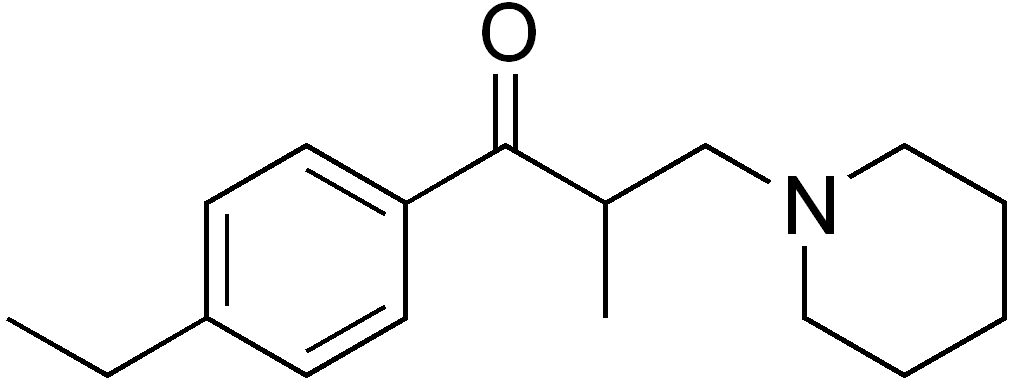

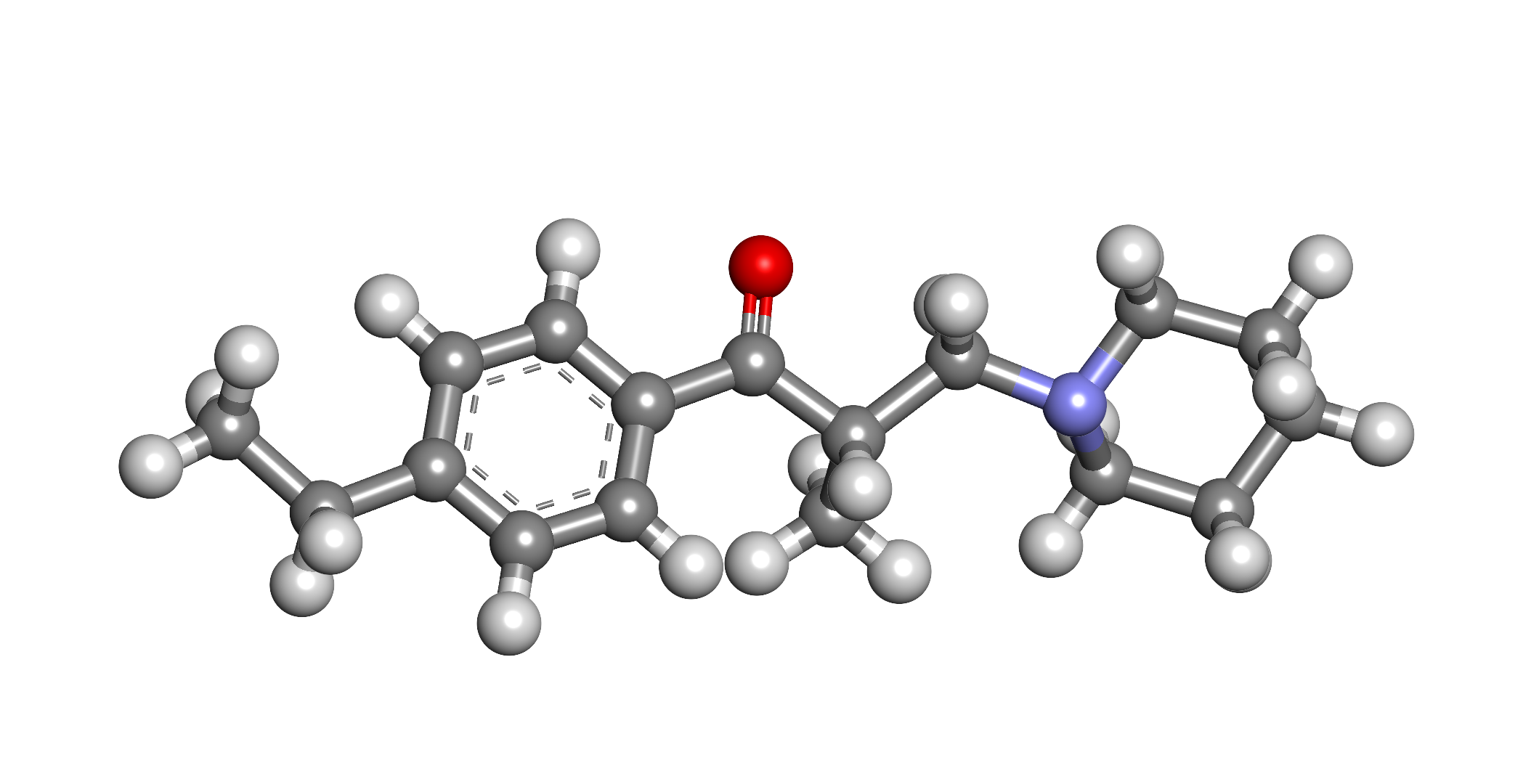

Clinical data
- Trade names: Myonal
- AHFS/Drugs.com: International Drug Names
- Routes of administration: Oral
- ATC code: M03BX09 (WHO)

Legal status
- Legal status: In general: ℞ (Prescription only)

Identifiers
- IUPAC name: (2RS)-1-(4-Ethylphenyl)-2-methyl-3-(1-piperidyl)propan-1-one
- CAS Number: 64840-90-0; HCl: 56839-43-1
- PubChem CID: 3236
- DrugBank: DB08992
- ChemSpider: 3123
- UNII: 2M2P0551D3; HCl: U38O8U7P6X
- KEGG: D01671
- ChEBI: CHEBI:77069
- ChEMBL: ChEMBL1902981
- CompTox Dashboard (EPA): DTXSID5040671

Chemical and physical data
- Formula: C_{17}H_{25}NO
- Molar mass: 259.393 g·mol^{−1}
- 3D model (JSmol): Interactive image
- SMILES: CCc1ccc(cc1)C(=O)C(C)CN2CCCCC2
- InChI: InChI=1S/C17H25NO/c1-3-15-7-9-16(10-8-15)17(19)14(2)13-18-11-5-4-6-12-18/h7-10,14H,3-6,11-13H2,1-2H3; Key:SQUNAWUMZGQQJD-UHFFFAOYSA-N

Eperisone (formulated as the eperisone hydrochloride salt) is an antispasmodic drug.

Eperisone acts by relaxing both skeletal muscles and vascular smooth muscles, and demonstrates a variety of effects such as reduction of myotonia, improvement of circulation, and suppression of the pain reflex. The drug inhibits the vicious circle of myotonia by decreasing pain, ischaemia, and hypertonia in skeletal muscles, thus alleviating stiffness and spasticity, and facilitating muscle movement

Eperisone also improves dizziness and tinnitus associated with cerebrovascular disorders or cervical spondylosis.

Eperisone has a relatively low incidence of sedation when compared with other antispasmodic drugs; this simplifies the clinical application of the drug and makes it an attractive choice for patients who require antispasmodic therapy without a reduction in alertness.

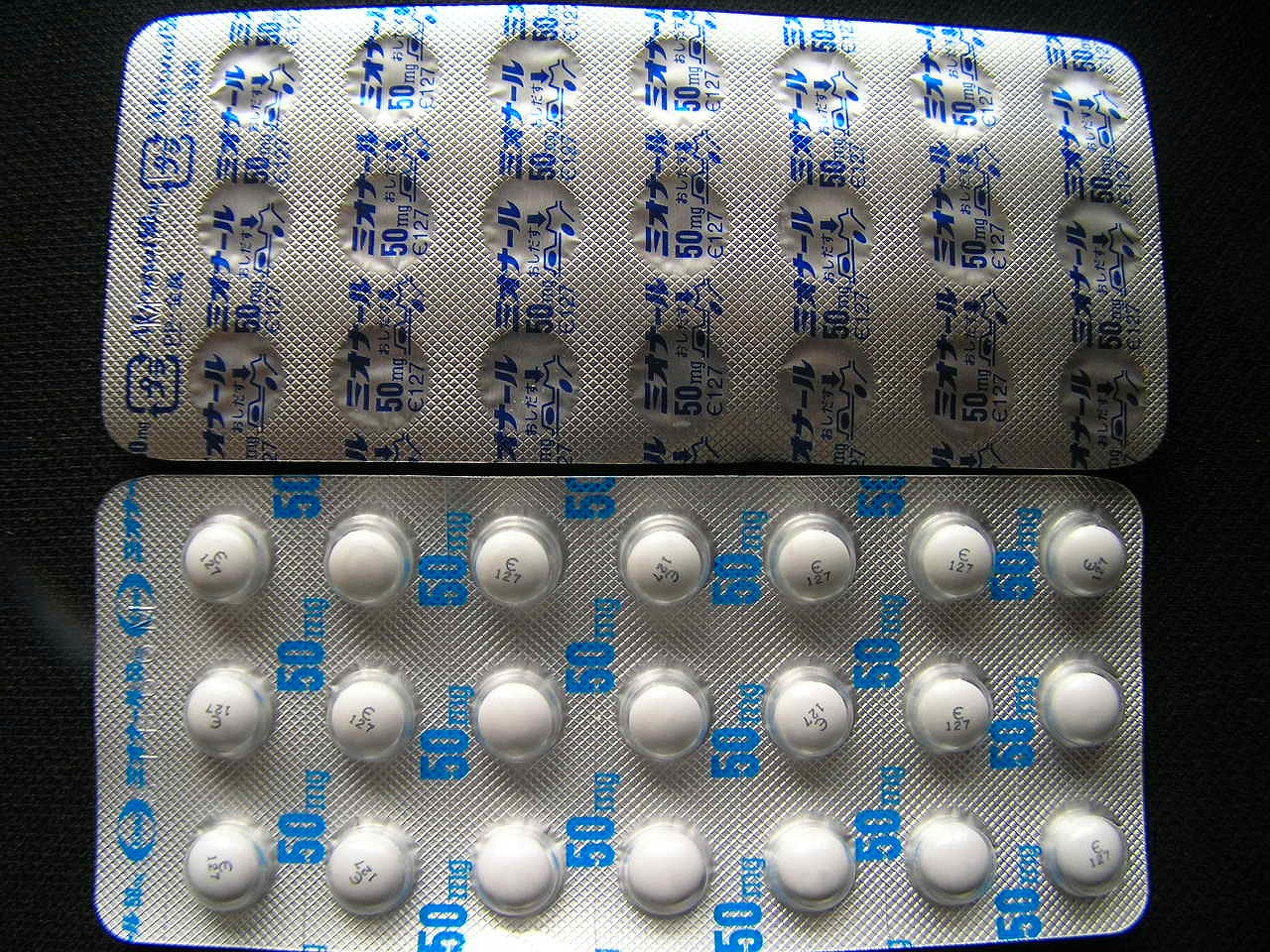
Japanese package of eperisone

Eperisone also facilitates voluntary movement of the upper and lower extremities without reducing muscle power; it is therefore useful during the initial stage of rehabilitation and as a supporting drug during subsequent rehabilitative therapy.

== Indications ==
- Spastic paralysis in conditions such as cerebrovascular disease
- Spastic spinal paralysis
- Cervical spondylosis
- Postoperative sequelae (including from cerebrospinal tumour)
- Sequelae to trauma (e.g. spinal trauma or head injury)
- Amyotrophic lateral sclerosis
- Cerebral palsy
- Spinocerebellar degeneration
- Spinal vascular diseases and other encephalomyelopathies
- Cervical syndrome, periarthritis of the shoulder, and lumbago.

== Presentation ==
Eperisone hydrochloride is available as the brand name preparations Myonal and Epry as 50 mg sugar-coated tablets, or as 10% granules for oral administration. An experimental form of the drug, as a transdermal patch system, has shown promising results in laboratory tests on rodents; however, this product is not currently available for human use.

== Dosage and administration ==
In adults, the usual dose of eperisone is 50–150 mg per day, in divided doses, after meals. However, the dosage is adjusted by the prescribing clinician depending on factors such as severity of symptoms, patient age and response.

Eperisone has not been established as definitely safe for paediatric use, therefore its use in paediatrics cannot be recommended without further study.

If elderly patients are treated with eperisone, a reduced dose is recommended, and the patient should be closely monitored for signs of physiological hypofunction during treatment.

== Safety during pregnancy and breast-feeding ==
Eperisone has not been established to be safe for use by pregnant women; therefore the drug should not be used in pregnant women, or women who may be pregnant, if the expected therapeutic benefits will outweigh the possible risks associated with treatment. The manufacturers of Myonal recommend the drug not be used during lactation (breast-feeding). If eperisone must be used, the patient is advised to stop breast-feeding for the duration of treatment. Eperisone has been reported to be excreted in breast milk in an animal study (in rats).

== Pharmacology ==
- Skeletal muscle relaxation
- Relaxation of hypertonic skeletal muscles
- Improves intramuscular blood flow
- Suppression of spinal reflex potentials
- Reduction of muscle spindle sensitivity via motor neurons
- Vasodilatation and augmentation of blood flow
- Analgesic action and inhibition of the pain reflex in the spinal cord

== Contraindications ==
Eperisone is contraindicated in patients with known hypersensitivity to the drug. Side effects: 'very rare' excessive relaxation, stomachache, nausea, vertigo, anorexia, drowsiness, skin rashes, diarrhoea, vomiting, indigestion, GI disturbances, insomnia, headache, constipation etc.

== Cautions ==
Eperisone should be administered with care in patients with a history of hypersensitivity to any medication, or with disorders of liver function (it may aggravate hepatic dysfunction).

Weakness, light-headedness, sleepiness or other symptoms may occur. In the event of such symptoms, the dosage should be reduced or treatment discontinued. Patients should be cautioned against engaging in potentially hazardous activities requiring alertness, such as operating machinery or driving a car.

== Side effects ==
- Shock and anaphylactoid reactions: In the event of symptoms such as redness, itching, urticaria, oedema of the face and other parts of the body, dyspnoea, etc., treatment should be discontinued and appropriate measures taken.
- Other side effects: anaemia, rash, pruritus, sleepiness, insomnia, headache, nausea and vomiting, anorexia, abdominal pain, diarrhoea, constipation, urinary retention or incontinence.

== Drug interactions ==
There have been reports of disturbances in ocular accommodation occurring after the concomitant use of the related drug tolperisone hydrochloride and methocarbamol.

== Safety in overdose ==
Seizures have been reported in an infant after accidental ingestion of eperisone.

== Future developments ==
Eperisone suffers from a very low bioavailability when taken orally, as a result of high first pass intestinal metabolism; a transdermal patch containing eperisone is currently in development in South Korea. This has shown promise, with the antispasmodic effect lasting over 24 hours, compared to one to two hours following oral administration.

Eperisone is also under investigation as an antihypertensive agent, with promising results from trials on beagles.

== Brand names ==
Eperisone is marketed under many brand names worldwide.

== See also ==
Chemically and mechanistically related drugs:

- Inaperisone
- Lanperisone
- Silperisone
- Tolperisone
