= Glycine receptor agonist =

Glycine receptor agonists are medications that act as agonists of the glycine receptor. They are compounds that bind to and activate the inhibitory glycine receptor (GlyR), a chloride-permeable ligand-gated ion channel that mediates fast synaptic inhibition primarily in the spinal cord and brainstem. The natural neurotransmitter glycine is considered a full agonist with maximal efficacy, producing an open probability exceeding 95% when the receptor is fully occupied. Partial agonists such as taurine and β-alanine produce submaximal responses compared to glycine, with taurine eliciting approximately half the maximum open probability response. Recent research has identified aminomethanesulfonic acid (AMS) as a potent glycine receptor agonist that is structurally intermediate between glycine and taurine, achieving a maximum single-channel open probability of 0.85 at acidic pH conditions where it remains chemically stable. Contemporary research has focused on developing positive allosteric modulators (PAMs) of glycine receptors as potential therapeutic agents for chronic pain conditions, given that enhanced glycinergic inhibition can provide analgesia. The tricyclic sulfonamide compound AM-1488 has emerged as a prototypical glycine receptor PAM that also exhibits direct agonistic activity, with oral administration at 20 mg/kg reducing allodynia in mouse models of neuropathic pain comparable to pregabalin treatment.

== Examples ==
=== Agonists ===
- β-Alanine
- D-Alanine
- D-Serine
- Glycine
- Hypotaurine
- L-Alanine
- L-Proline
- L-Serine
- Milacemide
- Quisqualamine
- Sarcosine
- Taurine

=== PAMs ===
- Ethanol

== See also ==
- Glycine receptor antagonist
