= Laudanosine =

- Skeletal formula

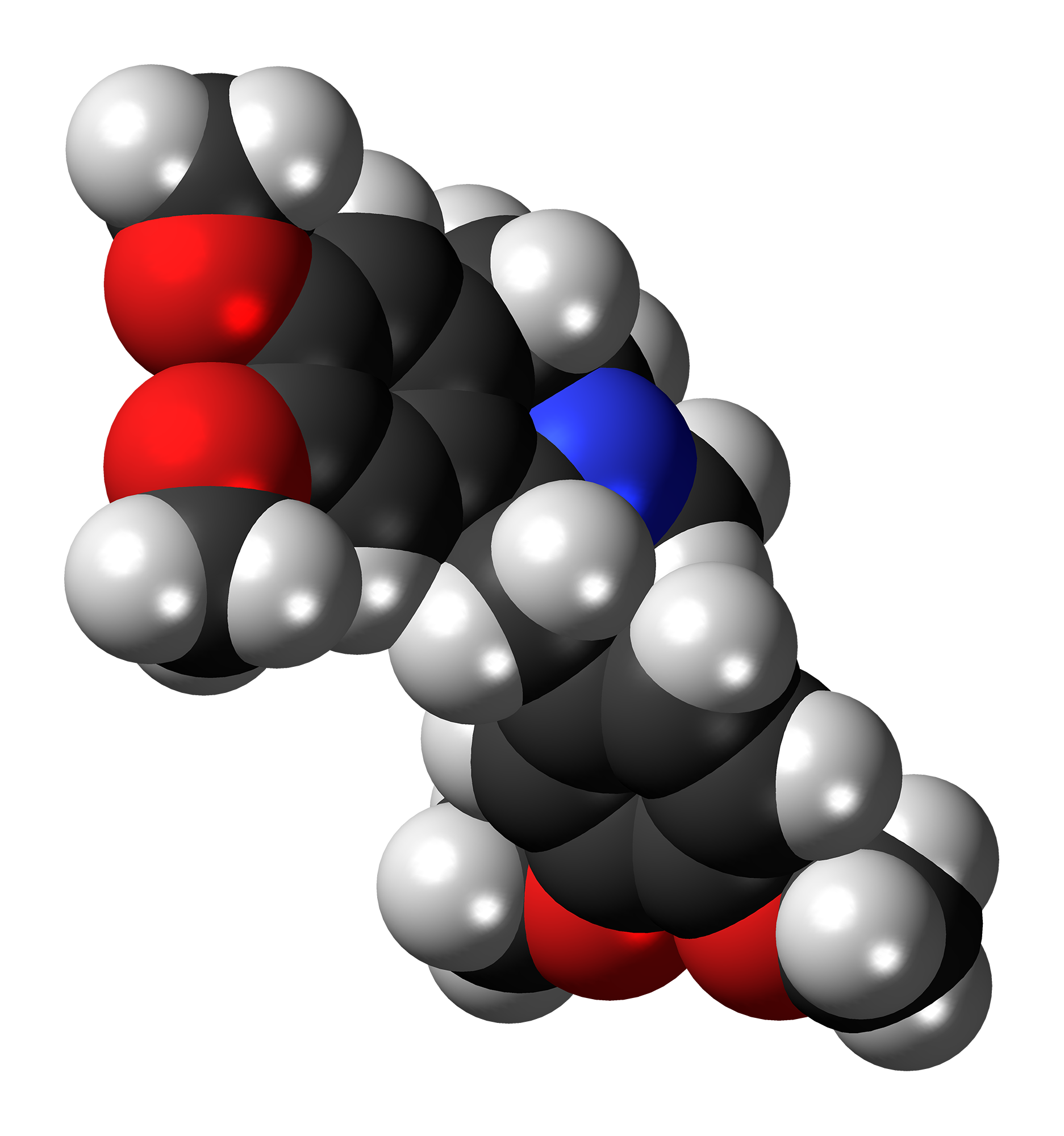
- Space-filling model

Names
- Preferred IUPAC name (1S)-1-[(3,4-Dimethoxyphenyl)methyl]-6,7-dimethoxy-2-methyl-1,2,3,4-tetrahydroisoquinoline
- Other names N-Methyl-1,2,3,4-tetrahydropapaverine

Identifiers
CAS Number	2688-77-9
3D model (JSmol)	Interactive image
ChemSpider	66114
ECHA InfoCard	100.018.412
EC Number	220-253-2
PubChem CID	73397
UNII	DA7R5WVN48
CompTox Dashboard (EPA)	DTXSID30878577
- InChI: InChI=1S/C21H27NO4/c1-22-9-8-15-12-20(25-4)21(26-5)13-16(15)17(22)10-14-6-7-18(23-2)19(11-14)24-3/h6-7,11-13,17H,8-10H2,1-5H3/t17-/m0/s1 Key: KGPAYJZAMGEDIQ-KRWDZBQOSA-N; InChI=1/C21H27NO4/c1-22-9-8-15-12-20(25-4)21(26-5)13-16(15)17(22)10-14-6-7-18(23-2)19(11-14)24-3/h6-7,11-13,17H,8-10H2,1-5H3/t17-/m0/s1 Key: KGPAYJZAMGEDIQ-KRWDZBQOBO
- SMILES: CN1CCc2cc(c(cc2[C@@H]1Cc3ccc(c(c3)OC)OC)OC)OC

Properties
Chemical formula	C_{21}H_{27}NO_{4}
Molar mass	357.450 g·mol^{−1}
Melting point	89 °C (192 °F; 362 K)
- Except where otherwise noted, data are given for materials in their standard state (at 25 °C [77 °F], 100 kPa). verify (what is ?) Infobox references

Laudanosine or N-methyltetrahydropapaverine is a metabolite of the pharmaceutical drugs atracurium and cisatracurium. Laudanosine decreases the seizure threshold, and thus it can induce seizures if present at sufficient threshold concentrations; however, such concentrations are unlikely to be produced consequent to chemodegradable metabolism of clinically administered doses of cisatracurium or atracurium.

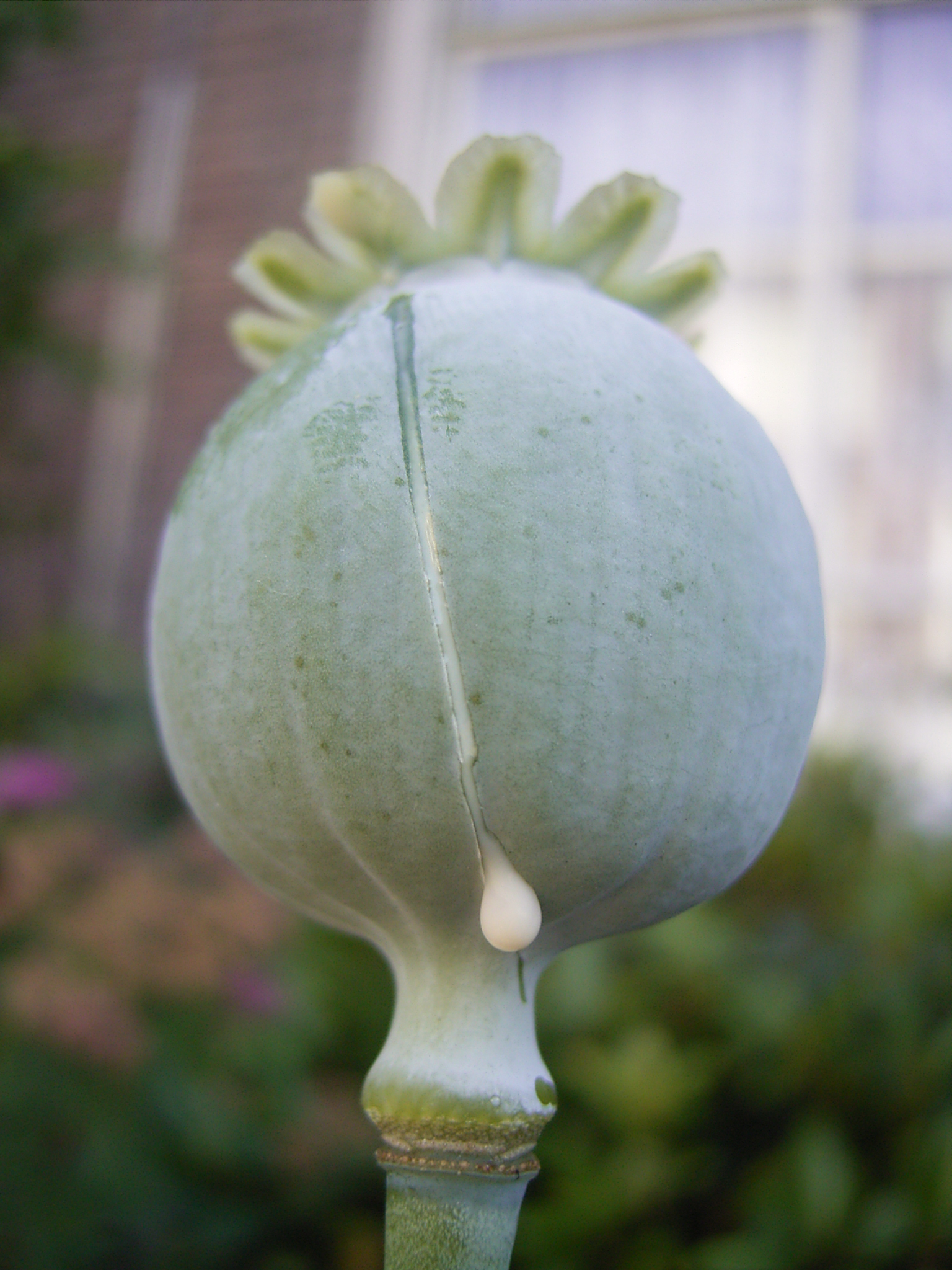
Capsule of Papaver somniferum showing latex (opium) exuding from incision. Laudanosine occurs naturally in small amounts (0.1%) in opium.

Laudanosine also occurs naturally in minute amounts (0.1%) in opium, from which it was first isolated in 1871. Partial dehydrogenation of laudanosine will lead to papaverine, the alkaloid found in the opium poppy plant (Papaver somniferum).

Laudanosine is a benzyltetrahydroisoquinoline alkaloid. It has been shown to interact with GABA receptors, glycine receptors, opioid receptors, and nicotinic acetylcholine receptors, but not benzodiazepine or muscarinic receptors, which are also involved in epilepsy and other types of seizures.
