= Alcuronium chloride =

Muscle relaxant

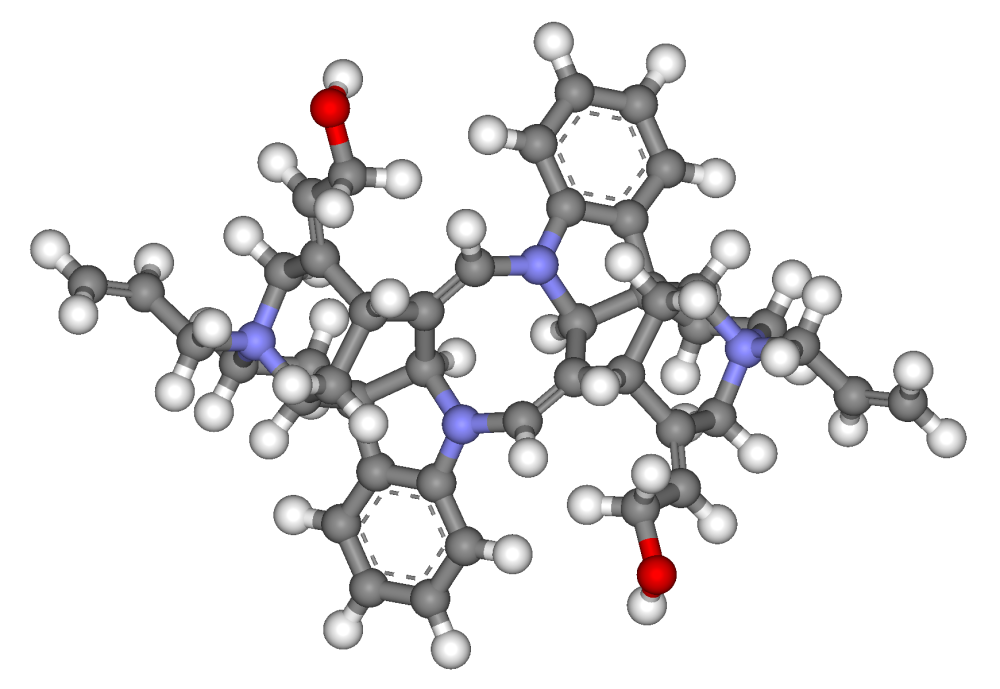

Clinical data
- Trade names: Alloferin
- Other names: Ro 4-3816, diallylnortoxiferine
- AHFS/Drugs.com: International Drug Names
- ATC code: M03AA01 (WHO)

Pharmacokinetic data
- Metabolism: not metabolized
- Elimination half-life: 2–4 hours
- Excretion: 70–90% unchanged in urine 1.3 mL/kg/min

Identifiers
- IUPAC name: 4,4'-Didemethyl-4,4'-di-propenyltoxiferin-1-dichloride
- CAS Number: 15180-03-7
- PubChem CID: 5311001
- IUPHAR/BPS: 341
- ChemSpider: 20118193
- UNII: 490DW6501Y
- ChEBI: CHEBI:31185
- CompTox Dashboard (EPA): DTXSID0045414
- ECHA InfoCard: 100.035.648

Chemical and physical data
- Formula: C_{44}H_{50}N_{4}O_{2}^{+2}
- Molar mass: 666.910 g·mol^{−1}
- 3D model (JSmol): Interactive image
- SMILES: [Cl-].[Cl-].OC\C=C6\C[N@+]4(CC=C)CC[C@@]58c%11ccccc%11N7\C=C9\[C@H]1C[C@H]2[C@@]%10(CC[N@@+]2(CC=C)C\C1=C\CO)c3ccccc3N(/C=C(/[C@H]6C[C@H]45)[C@H]78)[C@@H]9%10
- InChI: InChI=1S/C44H50N4O2.2ClH/c1-3-17-47-19-15-43-35-9-5-7-11-37(35)45-26-34-32-24-40-44(16-20-48(40,18-4-2)28-30(32)14-22-50)36-10-6-8-12-38(36)46(42(34)44)25-33(41(43)45)31(23-39(43)47)29(27-47)13-21-49;;/h3-14,25-26,31-32,39-42,49-50H,1-2,15-24,27-28H2;2*1H/q+2;;/p-2/b29-13-,30-14-,33-25-,34-26-;;/t31-,32-,39-,40-,41-,42-,43+,44+,47-,48-;;/m0../s1; Key:CPYGBGOXCJJJGC-GKLGUMFISA-L

Alcuronium chloride (formerly marketed as Alloferin) is a neuromuscular blocking (NMB) agent, alternatively referred to as a skeletal muscle relaxant. It is a semi-synthetic substance prepared from C-toxiferine I, a bis-quaternary alkaloid obtained from Strychnos toxifera. C-toxiferine I itself has been tested for its pharmacological action and noted to be a very long acting neuromuscular blocking agent For a formal definition of the durations of actions associated with NMB agents, see page for gantacurium. The replacement of both the N-methyl groups with N-allyl moieties yielded N,N-diallyl-bis-nortoxiferine, now recognized as alcuronium.

Inclusion of the allylic functions presented an enhanced potential area of biotransformation, and thus alcuronium is observed to have a much shorter duration of neuromuscular blocking action than its parent C-toxiferine I. It also has a more rapid onset of action, and is ~1.5 times as potent as tubocurarine. The pharmacological action of alcuronium is readily reversed by neostigmine, and it produces little histamine release. The major disadvantage of alcuronium is that it elicits a vagolytic effect produced by a selective atropine-like blockade of cardiac muscarinic receptors.

== Effects ==
- Cardiovascular system: histamine release and blockage of the sympathetic ganglia including adrenal medulla could cause hypotension
- Respiratory system: apnea due to phrenic blockage but bronchoconstriction can occur from the histamine release
- Central nervous system: no effect on intraocular pressure
- Autonomic ganglion blockade can cause a decrease in gut motility

== Special points ==
- Duration of action prolonged in states of low potassium, calcium and protein, also in states of high magnesium and acidosis.
- Pharmaceutically incompatible with thiopentone
- Infusion can cause fixed dilated pupils

== See also ==
- The International Pharmacopoeia
