= C11H8N2S =

The molecular formula C_{11}H_{8}N_{2}S (molar mass: 200.26 g/mol) may refer to:

- Camalexin (3-thiazole-2-yl-indole)
- MTEP, or 3-((2-Methyl-4-thiazolyl)ethynyl)pyridine
