= Toxiferine =

One of the most toxic plant alkaloids

Clinical data
- Other names: C-Toxiferine I C-Toxiferin I Toxiferine I

Identifiers
- IUPAC name: (2E)-2-[(1S,9Z,11S,13S,14S,17S,25Z,27S,30S,33S,35S,36S,38E)-38-(2-hydroxyethylidene)-14,30-dimethyl-8,24-diaza-14,30-diazoniaundecacyclo[25.5.2.211,14.11,26.110,17.02,7.013,17.018,23.030,33.08,35.024,36]octatriaconta-2,4,6,9,18,20,22,25-octaen-28-ylidene]ethanol
- CAS Number: 6888-23-9;302-30-7
- PubChem CID: 5281411
- ChemSpider: 4444760
- UNII: 9M7D9K3OJI
- ChEMBL: ChEMBL231047
- CompTox Dashboard (EPA): DTXSID30897243

Chemical and physical data
- Formula: C_{40}H_{46}N_{4}O_{2}
- Molar mass: 614.834 g·mol^{−1}
- 3D model (JSmol): Interactive image
- SMILES: [H][C@@]12[C@@]3(CC[N+]2(C)C/C4=C/CO)[C@@]5([H])N(C6=C3C=CC=C6)/C=C7[C@]([C@@]8(CC[N+]9(C)C/%10)[C@]9([H])C[C@]\7([H])C%10=C/CO)([H])N(C%11=C8C=CC=C%11)/C=C5/[C@]4([H])C1
- InChI: InChI=1S/C40H46N4O2/c1-43-15-13-39-31-7-3-5-9-33(31)41-22-30-28-20-36-40(14-16-44(36,2)24-26(28)12-18-46)32-8-4-6-10-34(32)42(38(30)40)21-29(37(39)41)27(19-35(39)43)25(23-43)11-17-45/h3-12,21-22,27-28,35-38,45-46H,13-20,23-24H2,1-2H3/q+2/b25-11-,26-12-,29-21-,30-22-/t27-,28-,35-,36-,37-,38-,39+,40+,43-,44-/m0/s1

Toxiferine, also known as c-toxiferine I, is one of the most toxic plant alkaloids known. It is derived from several plant species, including Strychnos toxifera. Historically, it has been used as an arrow poison by indigenous peoples in South America for its neuromuscular blocking properties, allowing them to paralyze animals during hunting, but also possibly kill due to paralysis of the respiratory muscles. Toxiferine functions as an acetylcholine receptor (AChR) antagonist. The paralysis caused by toxiferine can in turn be antagonized by neostigmine.

Toxiferine is the most important component in calabash curare. Curare poisons contain many different toxins with similar properties of toxiferine. The most well known component of curare is tubocurarine. The paralysis caused by toxiferine is very similar to that caused by tubocurarine, however toxiferine is ~170 times as potent. The preparation of curare poisons involves complex rituals wherein the tribes extract toxins from various plants.

== History ==
Curare was discovered in 1595, however toxiferine was only first isolated and characterized in 1941 by Wieland, Bähr and Witkop. They managed to produce only a couple micrograms of this compound as it is quite hard to isolate in large enough quantities to study. This is due to the complexity of curare as it is composed of many different alkaloids. In 1949 King was able to isolate 12 different types of toxiferines (I to XII). In 1951 some of these toxiferine types were analyzed for their toxicological and pharmacological properties. These types were found to differ slightly in structure and their potency.

Curares like tubocurarine were later used as anesthetics in medical procedures, but were replaced in the 1960s by synthetic curare-like drugs like alcuronium, pancuronium, atracurium and vecuronium. These drugs were safer to use as they had a shorter duration of action and less side effects.

After the replacement of curares by these synthetic alternatives, research on toxiferine declined as it was hard to isolate from calabash curare and better alternatives to curares had been found thus decreasing the interest in researching this specific compound. However, curares as a whole have been (and still are) extensively researched.

== Use/purpose ==
Toxiferine is most commonly known for its use as an arrow poison alongside other curares by south american tribes. It is extracted from plants, like strychnos toxifera and chondrodendron tomentosum. It is hard to extract in large quantities. It is very toxic however, so small quantities will suffice in paralyzing or killing animals while hunting. It could be used as an anesthetic in medical procedures, however it has a very long duration of action which doesn't make it suitable for such procedures. It is also unstable in solution, which further prevents its use in medical settings. Synthetic alternatives like alcuronium can and are still used in anesthetics due to their relatively shorter duration of action and fewer side effects.

=== Efficacy ===
Toxiferine is especially useful as an arrow poison because of its very minimal absorption through oral ingestion. Which is why it is safe to eat the animal after it has been shot with an arrow covered in toxiferine. It is also believed that because of its activity as muscle paralyzer, it can retain glycogen and ATP from releasing after death and by this delay rigor mortis. This makes the meat more tender for longer and maintains its flavor.

== Mechanism of action ==
Toxiferine I competes with acetylcholine, a neurotransmitter, for binding to the nicotinic acetylcholine receptors on the post-synaptic membrane of the neuromuscular junction. By binding to these receptors, toxiferine I prevents acetylcholine from attaching to them. This inhibition blocks the ion channels associated with these receptors from opening, thereby preventing the influx of sodium ions into the muscle cell. The prevention of sodium influx leads to an inhibition of depolarization of the post-synaptic membrane, which is a necessary step for muscle contraction. Without depolarization, the muscle fiber cannot generate an action potential, resulting in muscle paralysis.

Toxiferine I is a potent antagonist for several acetylcholine receptors, but especially potent for muscle-type nAChR:

Affinities of toxiferine and related compounds for acetylcholine receptor subtypes
Compound	nicotinic acetylcholine receptor (muscle-type nAChR) K_{i} (nM)	alpha-7 nicotinic receptor (α7 nAChR) IC_{50} (nM)	muscarinic acetylcholine receptor M_{2} (allosteric site) EC_{0.5,diss} (nM)
toxiferine I	14	9500	96
alcuronium	234	4100	2

=== Binding ===
Similar to alcuronium, toxiferine is classified as a non-depolarizing neuromuscular-blocking drug. These are drugs that inhibit signal transduction by competitive inhibition of in this case mainly muscle-type nAChRs. Toxiferine though binds 17 times stronger to muscle-type nAChRs than its pharmacological analogue alcuronium. The quaternary ammonium salt that toxiferine and its analogues share with acetylcholine is thought to be the reason for the binding affinity to the AChRs. The exact reason for the especially high binding affinity of toxiferine to for example muscle-type nAChRs is unknown. There have been attempts at understanding the exact binding of toxiferine in nAChRs, but the models are dated.

=== Reversing the mechanism ===
Neostigmine is known to be effective at reversing the competitive inhibition of toxiferine and its analogues. Neostigmine works by inhibiting acetylcholinesterase, increasing the acetylcholine concentrations so it can compete more with the non-depolarizing neuromuscular-blocking drug. By this toxiferine can be freed into the circulation for excretion.

== Chemistry ==
=== Structure ===
Toxiferine I is an indole alkaloid derived from tryptamine. It has a dimeric structure with each monomer containing a quaternary ammonium salt. The parent structure, without counter ions, has the molecular formula C_{40}H_{46}N_{4}O_{2}^{2+}, while the dichloride salt has the molecular formula C_{40}H_{46}N_{4}O_{2}Cl_{2}. Alkaloids are naturally occurring compounds that are basic and contain at least one nitrogen atom. Toxiferine is classified as a dimeric bisindole alkaloid because it is symmetrically constructed from two identical monomeric units, each containing an indole ring.

=== Analogues ===
A dozen different types of toxiferine were found to exist (designated as toxiferine I to XII), but the different structures of toxiferine II till XII have not been studied in great detail. Toxiferine does have multiple analogues which are researched extensively. Some of these include: bisnortoxiferine, caracurine V and alcuronium. Caracurine V is, like toxiferine, another naturally occurring curare toxin from the strychnos toxifera. Caracurine V, unlike the other analogues, has a closed ring formed between the hydroxyl groups and the middle ring. Though the main difference between the analogues are the side groups attached to the positive nitrogen atom, also called the quaternary ammonium ion. The main target of toxiferine and its analogues are acetylcholine receptors. It is this quaternary ammonium ion that both toxiferine and its analogues share with acetylcholine that gives them their specific affinity for these receptors. The difference in hydroxyl side groups together with most importantly the quaternary ammonium side groups is believed to cause the variability in receptor affinity and metabolic activity and with this a variability in the toxic properties of these analogues. From this it can be concluded that the side groups of toxiferine, mainly those attached to the quaternary ammonium have large effect over its reactivity and affinity, but to this day no research exists that can reliably explain the structural reactivity of toxiferine.

=== Biosynthesis ===
Toxiferine is an indole alkaloid. Indole alkaloids are the largest among the alkaloids. They are primarily synthesized using tryptophan. The dimeric subunits of toxiferine bear high similarity to strychnine and may be a related product of its biosynthesis. Especially the intermediate Wieland-Gumlich aldehyde is very similar to the dimeric subunits of toxiferine, though this lacks the quaternary ammonium ion. The biosynthesis of strychnine was solved in 2022. It is also possible to artificially synthesise strychnine. The exact biosynthetic and possible artificial ways to synthesise toxiferine are not known.

It is believed though that toxiferine may be biosynthetically derived from the monoterpenoid indole alkaloid strictosidine. Strictosidine in turn is derived from the alkaloid tryptamine and the terpene secologanin through the action of strictosidine synthase.

== ADME ==
This describes the ADME of toxiferine.

=== Absorption ===
Toxiferine is known to enter the body in two different ways: either orally by ingestion or intravenously while applied to a sharp tip for killing purposes. When orally ingested, toxiferine is only absorbed minimally into the plasma and is not known to be dangerous even though it has a very high potency. Intravenous absorption is thus the only way of effective administration.

=== Distribution ===
The distribution of toxiferine has been researched in rats. Toxiferine distributes through the body in a way that is similar to other non-depolarizing curare alkaloids. Toxiferine is a highly water soluble substance and because of this also generally not lipophilic. Toxiferine does not easily pass the blood-brain barrier. It is mostly retained in motor endplates and the sciatic nerve where it binds to specific receptors. It was also found that toxiferine is distributed to tissues with a high acidic mucopolysaccharide content like intervertebral discs and cartilage of the ribs. Alkaloids are known to have affinity for such polysaccharides at acidic extracellular pH.

=== Metabolism ===
Toxiferine does not have any known metabolic pathways. This may be due to its low lipophilicity. Bis-quaternary nitrogen compounds like toxiferine have shown to be dependent on their lipophilicity to be transported to sites in the liver. The liver, which is the main site of metabolic activity, can thus not or hardly be reached. When comparing the metabolic activity of toxiferine to that of maybe its most important analogue alcuronium, it is observed that the allylic side chains of alcuronium make it more potent for biotransformation than toxiferine with its methyl side chains. This makes the duration of action of toxiferine significantly longer when compared to alcuronium.

=== Excretion ===
Toxiferine is mainly excreted in the urine even though elimination of toxiferine by the kidney is very poor relative to its analogue alcuronium. Toxiferine has a strong receptor affinity, which together with the poor excretion makes it accumulate in the body rapidly after repeated administration. This is another reason why toxiferine has an especially long duration of action in the body.

== Toxicological data ==
The effects of toxiferine have been studied in multiple organisms like rhesus monkeys, guinea pigs and mice by intravenous (IV) and intramuscular (IM) injections of different doses of toxiferine. The data on rhesus monkeys likely resembles human effects more closely.

The toxicity of toxiferine I in rhesus monkeys
	ED_{50} (μg/kg)	LD_{50} (μg/kg)	Therapeutic index (LD_{50}/ED_{50})	Margin of safety (LD_{1}/ED_{99})	Time till onset (min)
IV	5.5	8.9	1.61	1.33	<5
IM	6.5	17.8	2.74	1.89	<15

It has to be said that the duration of paralysis varies a lot between different individual monkeys and doses. It could be as short as 6 minutes but also as long as 85 minutes. In mice the LD100 was determined to be 23 μg/kg with a duration of paralysis around 12 minutes.
