= Gantacurium chloride =

Chemical compound

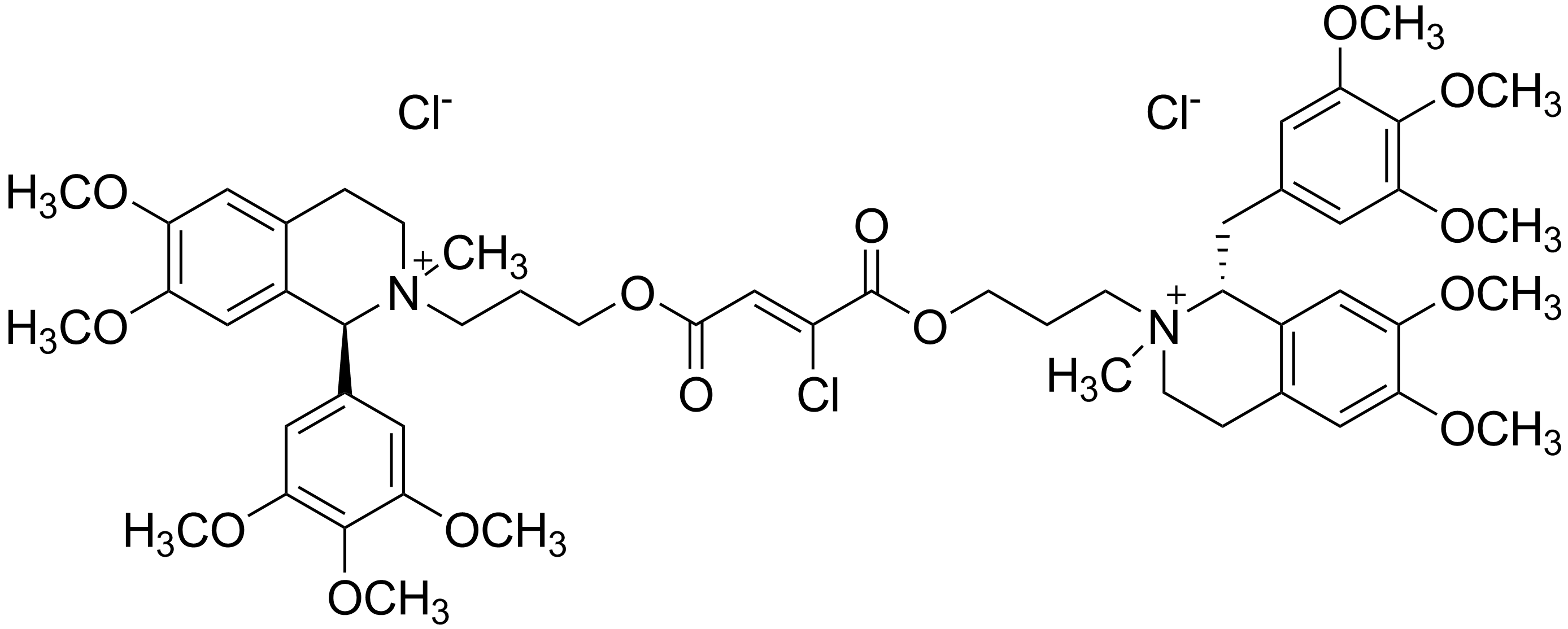

Clinical data
- Routes of administration: IV

Pharmacokinetic data
- Bioavailability: 100% (IV)
- Protein binding: unknown
- Metabolism: rapid inactivation by endogenous cysteine adduct formation followed by slow ester hydrolysis
- Elimination half-life: unknown
- Excretion: renal / hepatic

Identifiers
- IUPAC name: 4-O-[3-[(1S,2R)-6,7-dimethoxy-2-methyl-1-(3,4,5-trimethoxyphenyl)-3,4-dihydro-1H-isoquinolin-2-ium-2-yl]propyl]1-O-[3-[(1R,2S)-6,7-dimethoxy-2-methyl-1-[(3,4,5-trimethoxyphenyl)methyl]-3,4-dihydro-1H-isoquinolin-2-ium-2-yl]propyl](Z)-2-chlorobut-2-enedioate dichloride
- CAS Number: 213998-46-0
- PubChem CID: 10772467
- ChemSpider: 8947782
- UNII: LEY8QK99UR
- KEGG: D04303
- ChEMBL: ChEMBL275321
- CompTox Dashboard (EPA): DTXSID20175663

Chemical and physical data
- Formula: C_{53}H_{69}Cl_{3}N_{2}O_{14}
- Molar mass: 1064.48 g·mol^{−1}
- 3D model (JSmol): Interactive image
- SMILES: C[N@+]1(CCC2=CC(=C(C=C2[C@H]1CC3=CC(=C(C(=C3)OC)OC)OC)OC)OC)CCCOC(=O)/C(=C/C(=O)OCCC[N@+]4(CCC5=CC(=C(C=C5[C@@H]4C6=CC(=C(C(=C6)OC)OC)OC)OC)OC)C)/Cl.[Cl-].[Cl-]
- InChI: InChI=1S/C53H69ClN2O14.2ClH/c1-55(19-15-34-26-41(59-3)43(61-5)30-37(34)40(55)23-33-24-45(63-7)51(67-11)46(25-33)64-8)17-13-22-70-53(58)39(54)32-49(57)69-21-14-18-56(2)20-16-35-27-42(60-4)44(62-6)31-38(35)50(56)36-28-47(65-9)52(68-12)48(29-36)66-10;;/h24-32,40,50H,13-23H2,1-12H3;2*1H/q+2;;/p-2/b39-32-;;/t40-,50+,55-,56+;;/m1../s1; Key:SDIFKXLSGXCGEN-WJUBNSBASA-L

Gantacurium chloride (formerly recognized as GW280430A and as AV430A) is a new experimental neuromuscular blocking drug or skeletal muscle relaxant in the category of non-depolarizing neuromuscular-blocking drugs, used adjunctively in surgical anesthesia to facilitate endotracheal intubation and to provide skeletal muscle relaxation during surgery or mechanical ventilation. Gantacurium is no longer in clinical development.

== History ==
Gantacurium represents the third generation of tetrahydroisoquinolinium (THIQ) neuromuscular blocking drugs in a long lineage of compounds invented by medicinal chemists and scientists at Burroughs Wellcome Co., Research Triangle Park, North Carolina. Unlike all other clinically used tetrahydroisoquinolinium agents except cisatracurium, gantacurium is a stereo- and regioselective single isomer. And unlike any other traditional symmetrical predecessors in the family of bisbenzyltetrahydroisoquinolinium neuromuscular-blocking drugs, gantacurium is an asymmetric bis-onium ester of α-chlorofumaric acid: this particular feature arises solely from the (1R)-trans benzyltetrahydroisoquinolinium moiety at one onium head and a (1S)-trans phenyltetrahydroisoquinolinium moiety at the other onium head. The chlorine atom lies on the same side of the double bond as the benzyl-THIQ moiety (or the opposite side to the phenyl-THIQ moiety). Although the carboxylic acid groups are in opposite relationship across the double bond, as in fumaric acid [(E)-but-2-ene dioic acid], the chlorine atom is given the higher priority, so it's named as a (Z)-configuration at this stereobond.

The lineage of compounds leading to the rational discovery of gantacurium stems from seminal research in tetrafluorosuccinic acid-derived bisbenzyltetrahydroisoquinolinium esters first synthesized in February 1991 by a postdoctoral Fellow (Sanjay S. Patel, PhD) and James C. Wisowaty, PhD, in the Chemical Development Laboratories at Burroughs Wellcome Co. in collaboration with John J. Savarese, MD (Chairman of Anesthesiology at the New York Presbyterian-Weill Cornell Medical Center, New York City). The synthesis of symmetrical halofumarate and halosuccinate esters was prompted by initial attempts to make bis-onium tetrafluorosuccinic acid esters (compound 551U91 and 552U91)—the novel idea of a tetrafluorosuccinate linker between two onium heads being prompted by Roy A Swaringen, PhD (the then Group Director of Chemical Development Laboratories at Burroughs Wellcome Co.). It was very quickly realized, however, that the tetrafluorosuccinic acid esters were too unstable for isolation in sufficient quantities for extensive in vitro or in vivo preclinical evaluations. To circumvent the in situ instability of the fluoro derivatives, synthesis of bis-onium dichloro- and dibromosuccinates was undertaken: that in itself lead to complex intractable mixtures of mono- and di-halofumarate and halosuccinate compounds. The mixtures were inseparable initially but proved to be promising: in vivo tests of these mixtures (798W92 and 799W92) in a cat model pointed to potential leads for a compound with the highly prized duality of a rapid onset of action and an ultrashort duration of action (see below for definition of ultrashort duration). This led to the synthesis of prototypical bisbenzyltetrahydroisoquinolinium halofumarate esters in April 1992: compounds 1710W92 (a monochlorofumarate) and 1975W92 (a dichlorofumarate), both of which were noted for their ultrashort durations of action, and would differ structurally only very slightly from the future gantacurium in their stereochemistry and symmetry. Indeed, the idea of exploring asymmetric tetrahydroisoquinolinium esters had already been seeded with parallel and earlier syntheses of another series of asymmetric potential neuromuscular blocking agents, although the original concept for asymmetricity in the design of new neuromuscular blocking drugs dates back to 1962 with reported combinations of the respective halves of laudexium and succinylcholine (suxamethonium) modeled, presumably, on the asymmetric structure of the prototypical neuromuscular blocking agent d-tubocurarine that made its entry into anesthetic practice on 23 January 1942, at the Montreal Homeopathic Hospital.

Very shortly after the breakthrough in May 1992, however, Patel relinquished his Fellowship and further progress languished until late 1993/early 1994 when the research was resumed by another team of Burroughs Wellcome Co. chemists led by Eric Bigham PhD and Evan Boswell PhD: a series of stereoselective halofumarate and halosuccinate compounds were synthesized and tested for further lead optimisation. Again, however, the untimely intervening merger between Burroughs Wellcome Co. and its rival Glaxo Inc. to form the now non-existent GlaxoWellcome Inc. during 1995 resulted in even further delays to progress in optimizing the halosuccinate and halofumarate series of neuromuscular blocking drugs.

It was not until late in 1995 that further research and lead optimization was re-initiated by yet another team of medicinal chemists at GlaxoWellcome Inc. (Research Triangle Park) this time led by Eric E. Boros PhD, Robert A. Mook Jr. PhD, and Vicente Samano PhD. The team's work rapidly led to the first synthesis of GW280430A in 1996. Patents for gantacurium were subsequently applied for and issued in 1998.

=== Neuromuscular function parameters: definitions ===
The clinical arena of neuromuscular blocking agents is a minefield of jargonistic language, and some definitions below help to clarify:

- Train-of-Four (TOF) response: stimulated muscle twitch response (e.g., the adductor pollicis) elicited in trains of four when stimuli are applied (to the ulnar nerve for example) in a burst of four stimuli versus single stimuli
- ED_{95} dose: the dose of any given neuromuscular blocking agent required to produce 95% suppression of muscle twitch (e.g., the adductor pollicis) response under balanced anesthesia
- T_{25%} (also known as the clinical duration): the calculated difference in time between time of injection of drug and time to 25% recovery from neuromuscular block—this parameter defines the clinically effective neuromuscular block
- T_{75%} recovery: the calculated difference in time between time of injection of drug and time to 75% recovery from neuromuscular block
- T_{95%} recovery: the calculated difference in time between time of injection of drug and time to 95% recovery from neuromuscular block—this parameter effectively defines the timepoint at which full recovery from neuromuscular block is observed
- 25%–75% recovery index: the difference in time between the time to recovery to 25% and time to recovery to 75% of baseline value—this parameter is an indicator of the rate of recovery from neuromuscular block
- 5%–95% recovery index: the difference in time between the time to recovery to 5% and time to recovery to 95% of baseline value—another parameter that is an indicator of the rate of recovery from relatively complete block to full recovery from neuromuscular block
- T_{4}:T_{1} ≥ 0.7: a 70% ratio of the fourth twitch to the first twitch in a TOF—provides another measure of the recovery of neuromuscular function
- T_{4}:T_{1} ≥ 0.9: a 90% ratio of the fourth twitch to the first twitch in a TOF—provides another measure of the full recovery of neuromuscular function

=== Pharmacological action: definitions ===
In anesthetic clinical practice, neuromuscular blocking agents tend to be distinguished from each other based on their onset and duration of pharmacological action. The adjectives defining both the onset and duration were previously used arbitrarily and generally motivated by competition between the pharmaceutical companies marketing these agents. The arbitrary approach to the adjectives describing onset and duration was finally settled with definitive advice "from the FDA" in January 1995:

Classification of neuromuscular blocking agents by onset, duration and recovery of pharmacological action (minutes)
Adjective	Ultra-rapid / Ultra-short	Rapid / Short	Intermediate	Slow / Long
Clinical Onset (Time from injection to T_{max} suppression)	<1	1–2	2–4	>4
Clinical Duration (Time from injection to T_{25%} recovery)	<8	8–20	20–50	>50
Recovery Time (Time from injection to T_{95%} recovery)	<15	25–30	50–70	90–180
Recovery Index (T_{25%}–T_{75%} recovery slope)	2–3	6	10–15	>30

== Preclinical pharmacology ==
The preclinical pharmacology development of GW280430A has been studied in the cat, dog, and monkey models that have been the backbone of successful predecessor bistetrahydroisoquinolinium neuromuscular blocking drugs development projects such as atracurium (Tracrium), doxacurium (Nuromax), mivacurium (Mivacron) and cisatracurium (Nimbex), and others that were evaluated but not approved for clinical utility, e.g., BW A444.

== Clinical pharmacology and pharmacokinetics ==
The first clinical trial of GW280430A was conducted in a small cohort of healthy US volunteers (n=31) in December 1997 at the New York Presbyterian-Weill Cornell Medical Center, New York City. The study confirmed that, with propofol/fentanyl/N_{2}O/O_{2} anesthesia, gantacurium (ED_{95} = 0.19 mg/kg) has a rapid onset of action (maximum neuromuscular block ≤90 seconds at doses ranging from 2.5- to 3xED_{95}) and an ultra-short duration of action (clinical duration of ≤10 minutes for doses up to 0.72 mg/kg). Additionally, the spontaneous recovery rate was rapid, predictable, and independent of dose administered (1- to 4xED_{95}), indicating a lack of cumulative neuromuscular blocking effect: the 25–75% recovery index (indicating the rate of recovery) was 3 minutes, and complete recovery to TOF of 90% occurred ≤15 minutes (vs. ≤4 minutes after edrophonium administration). These data are secured from a small sample size, tempering any broad conclusions to be drawn until clinical studies with larger sample sizes are conducted.

In early 1998, shortly after conducting the first clinical study, GlaxoWellcome Inc. undertook a strategic decision to outlicense its US anesthesia research portfolio and franchise. Further clinical development of GW280430A therefore ceased until the portfolio was licensed in May 2002 to a now-defunct start-up company called Avera Pharmaceuticals (San Diego). Meanwhile, in the intervening period, scientists at the former GlaxoWellcome Inc. had conducted further research and developed a proprietary buffer excipient formulation intended to mitigate the mast cell degranulation seen upon rapid intravenous administration of high concentration doses of agents such as GW280430A that are intrinsically cationic. In 2003, a newly reformulated version of GW280430A (now renamed AV430A, and subsequently renamed again to the generic gantacurium chloride in 2004), using the licensed buffer excipient from GlaxoSmithKline, was re-investigated in a second clinical study in healthy US volunteers to compare the improvement in safety margin versus that with the original formulation. Success with the reformulated gantancurium in healthy volunteers led to initiation and conduct of a randomized, controlled, phase II multicenter European study investigating its utility for endotracheal intubation in 230 patients undergoing surgical anesthesia. The phase II study was completed successfully by Spring 2006: >90% of patients administered with gantacurium were assessed to have acceptable tracheal intubation within 60 seconds of its injection. However, a peer-reviewed full publication of these data from this European study has yet to be published, despite early presentation of these data as abstracts.

Gantacurium is currently (as of March 2010) under phase III clinical development by Maruishi Pharmaceutical Co. Ltd. (Japan), which licensed the compound from Avera Pharmaceuticals. Maruishi is better known in the world of anesthesia for its invention of sevoflurane, a commonly used gaseous anesthetic agent.

The singular distinguishing clinical feature of gantacurium from any other non-depolarizing neuromuscular blocking drug clinically tested is that of a rapid onset and an ultrashort duration of action even when administered at 3–4 times the ED_{95} doses. With the exception of one other clinically tested agent, BW785U77, no other clinically administered neuromuscular blocking drug has matched this feat to date: all other non-depolarizing neuromuscular blocking drugs clinically administered at equivalent doses most certainly would result in a medium or long duration of action albeit with a rapid onset of paralyzing effect. In this sense, gantacurium is a first in its class non-depolarizing neuromuscular blocking drug to arguably challenge the pharmacological profile of the gold-standard ultrashort acting depolarizing agent succinylcholine (suxamethonium). BW785U77 was not pursued for further clinical development owing to its propensity for eliciting histamine release in humans with more intensity than that observed during pre-clinical evaluation in animals. Research in the neuromuscular blocking drugs arena for the better part of the 1980s and 1990s has been to find a non-depolarizing replacement for succinylcholine.

Preliminary in vitro investigations indicate that the in vivo pharmacological activity likely undergoes rapid "chemo-inactivation" via cysteine adduct formation followed by slow biodegradation via ester hydrolysis. The pharmacologically inert cysteine adduct subsequently undergoes ester hydrolysis and the by-products are eliminated via renal and/or hepatic mechanisms. Unlike the pH- and temperature-dependent chemodegradation seen with atracurium and cisatracurium, the inactivation of gantacurium via cysteine adduct formation is independent of body pH and temperature.

The use of extrinsically administered cysteine to deliberately accelerate reversal of the pharmacological effect of fumarate bis-onium neuromuscular blocking drugs (RV002 [formerly known as AV002], CW002 and CW011) is being investigated currently.

== Adverse effects ==
=== Histamine release—hypotension, reflex tachycardia and cutaneous flushing ===
Gantacurium chloride is not associated with histamine release when administered as a rapid bolus (<5 seconds administration time) at doses up to and including 0.45 mg/kg (≤2.5xED_{95}) according to one small study in healthy human volunteers. At 0.54 mg/kg (just under 3xED95 dose), one of four volunteers experienced histamine release with associated hypotension (30% maximum decrease in blood pressure and 13% maximum increase in heart rate) but no cutaneous flushing. At the highest administered dose of 0.72 mg/kg, three of four volunteers experienced histamine release with associated hypotension (17% to 34% maximum decrease in blood pressure and 16% to 25% increase in heart rate) and cutaneous flushing. These effects were transient and lasted no more than two minutes and did not require any adjunctive treatment to address the changes in blood pressure or heart rate.

The tetrahydroisoquinolinium class of neuromuscular blocking agents, in general, is associated with histamine release upon rapid administration of a bolus intravenous injection. There are some exceptions to this rule, e.g., cisatracurium (Nimbex) is one such agent that does not elicit histamine release even up to 5xED_{95} bolus doses or continuous infusions. On the other hand, histamine liberation is not a domain exclusive to the tetrahydroisoquinolinium agents: in vitro data confirm that the aminosteroidal agents also have the potential to evoke histamine release, though the mechanisms of mast cell activation may differ. Indeed, histamine release has been reported with administration of pancuronium.

The liberation of histamine is a dose-dependent phenomenon such that, with increasing doses administered at the same rate, there is a greater propensity for eliciting histamine release and its ensuing sequelae. Most commonly, the histamine release following administration of these agents is associated with observable cutaneous flushing (facial face and arms, commonly), hypotension and a consequent reflex tachycardia. These sequelae are very transient effects: the total duration of the cardiovascular effects is no more than one to two minutes while the facial flush may take around 3–4 minutes to dissipate—(note: half-life of plasma histamine is ~2 minutes). Because these effects are so transient, there is no reason to administer adjunctive therapy to ameliorate either the cutaneous or cardiovascular effects. Thus, in the fierce battle to win market share for sales of the "steroidal" versus the terahydroisoquinolinium class of neuromuscular blocking agents, fact and information pertaining to adverse events were distorted to suit partisan taste, and, consequently, much misinformation was deliberately disseminated regarding histamine release and its effects: this was particularly so in the 1980s and 1990s shortly after the near simultaneous competitive clinical introduction of atracurium (Tracrium—a bis-benzyltetrahydroisoquinolinium (BBTHIQ) neuromuscular blocking agent marketed by Burroughs Wellcome Co., now subsumed into GlaxoSmithKline) and vecuronium (Norcuron—a steroidal neuromuscular blocking agent marketed by Organon, now subsumed into Merck & Co. Inc.). The most common misinformation seeded into the minds of anesthesiologists was the failure to categorically state that the cardiovascular effects following histamine release were transient: instead, the marketing focus was single-mindedly to regurgitate and emphasize that the tetrahydroisoquinolinium class elicited histamine release that could prove to be a danger to the cardiovascular stability of the patient during surgical procedures. There was complete failure to disseminate the true picture that these effects were not only transient but that the extent of the hypotensive effect and the reflex tachycardia were rarely of clinical significance and therefore did not require adjunctive therapy, as evidenced by the complete lack of any clinical literature advocating the need for adjunctive antihistamine use concomitantly with the administration of tetrahydroisoquinolinium neuromuscular blocking agents. Unfortunately, these ill-willed beguiling marketing notions have persisted through the decades and become ingrained with each successive generation of newly qualified anesthesiologists and CRNAs (certified registered nurse anesthetists) to the extent that the mere mention of "benzylisoquinolines" (the erroneous but commonly used class name for tetrahydroisoquinolinium neuromuscular blocking agents) immediately conjures images of histamine release, cardiovascular instability and generates unnecessary anxiety.

=== Bronchospasm—pulmonary compliance ===
Incidents of bronchospasm associated with intravenous administration of gantacurium have not been reported to date.

Antagonistic action at the airway presynaptic parasympathetic M2 muscarinic receptors or allosteric potentiation of the post-synaptic acetylcholine M3 muscarinic receptors is thought to be the mechanism that precipitates airway constriction and bronchospam. Although neuromuscular blocking agents are designed to antagonize nicotinic acetylcholine receptors, they are also suspected to antagonize the muscarinic receptors. The issue of bronchospasm acquired considerable prominence in the neuromuscular blocking agents arena after the spectacular failure of a clinically introduced neuromuscular blocking agent, rapacuronium (Raplon—a steroidal neuromuscular blocking agent marketed by Organon, now subsumed into Merck & Co. Inc.), which had to be withdrawn voluntarily during the week of March 19, 2001 from clinical use (<2 years after its approval by the US FDA on August 18, 1999—NME Drug and New Biologic Approvals in 1999) after several serious events of bronchospasm, including five "unexplained" fatalities, following its administration. That is not to say that bronchospasm was an unknown phenomenon prior to rapacuronium: occasional reports of bronchospasm have been noted also with the prototypical agents, tubocurarine and succinylcholine, as well as atracurium, alcuronium, pancuronium, vecuronium, and gallamine.

Recent data from studies in Guinea pigs confirm that gantacurium (as well as cisatracurium) is devoid of significant effects at airway muscarinic receptors and therefore, unlike rapacuronium (Raplon), not likely to cause bronchospasm at clinically relevant doses.

=== Laudanosine—epileptic foci ===
Administration of gantacurium has not been reported, to date, to result in any measured levels of laudanosine (a completely unlikely event, in any case). Laudanosine is a metabolite associated with other related neuromuscular blocking agents such as cisatracurium and atracurium and its detected presence is consequent to the in vivo Hofmann elimination of both these chemodegradable agents (cf. the initial 1985 editorial commentary by Frank G. Standaert, MD on the controversial laudanosine issue with atracurium, with more detailed information on the issue in the Wikipedia article on atracurium itself).

The structural difference between gantacurium and these two agents (cisatracurium and atracurium)—in particular, the reverse positioning of the carboxyl ester and onium nitrogen groups—absolutely ensures that gantacurium will never undergo Hofmann elimination just as is the case with mivacurium and doxacurium.
