= Tryptophan N-monooxygenase =

Class of enzymes

Identifiers
- EC no.: 1.14.14.156

Databases
- IntEnz: IntEnz view
- BRENDA: BRENDA entry
- ExPASy: NiceZyme view
- KEGG: KEGG entry
- MetaCyc: metabolic pathway
- PRIAM: profile
- PDB structures: RCSB PDB PDBe PDBsum
Search
- PMC: articles
- PubMed: articles
- NCBI: proteins

Tryptophan N-monooxygenase (EC 1.14.14.156, tryptophan N-hydroxylase, CYP79B1, CYP79B2, CYP79B3) is an enzyme with systematic name L-tryptophan,NADPH:oxygen oxidoreductase (N-hydroxylating). It catalyses the following overall chemical reaction:

tryptophan
2 O_{2}
3 H_{2}O
indol-3-ylacetaldoxime
+ CO_{2}

Tryptophan N-monooxygenase is a cytochrome P450 protein containing heme, first isolated from Sinapis alba. It uses molecular oxygen for the oxidation and requires a partner cytochrome P450 reductase for functional expression. This uses nicotinamide adenine dinucleotide phosphate. The reaction proceeds via N-hydroxylation to an intermediate which loses carbon dioxide. The product of the reaction is an intermediate in the biosyntheis of the auxin, indole acetic acid, and the phytoalexin, camalexin.
