= Vellosimine dehydrogenase =

Chemical enzyme

vellosimine dehydrogenase

Identifiers
- EC no.: 1.1.1.273
- CAS no.: 86777-26-6

Databases
- IntEnz: IntEnz view
- BRENDA: BRENDA entry
- ExPASy: NiceZyme view
- KEGG: KEGG entry
- MetaCyc: metabolic pathway
- PRIAM: profile
- PDB structures: RCSB PDB PDBe PDBsum
- Gene Ontology: AmiGO / QuickGO
Search
- PMC: articles
- PubMed: articles
- NCBI: proteins

In enzymology, vellosimine dehydrogenase (EC 1.1.1.273) is an enzyme that catalyzes the chemical reaction

10-deoxysarpagine
+ NADP^{+}
H^{+}
H^{+}
vellosimine
+ NADPH

The two substrates of this enzyme are 10-deoxysarpagine and oxidised nicotinamide adenine dinucleotide phosphate (NADP^{+}). Its products are the indole alkaloid vellosimine, reduced NADPH, and a proton.

This enzyme belongs to the family of oxidoreductases, specifically those acting on the CH-OH group of donor with NAD^{+} or NADP^{+} as acceptor. The systematic name of this enzyme class is 10-deoxysarpagine:NADP^{+} oxidoreductase. This enzyme participates in indole and ipecac alkaloid biosynthesis.
