= BW-A444 =

Chemical compound

Legal status
- Legal status: Investigational

Identifiers
- IUPAC name: 2,2'-[1,4-phenylenebis[(1-oxo-2-propene-3,1-diyl)oxy-3,1-propanediyl]]bis[1,2,3,4-tetrahydro-6,7-dimethoxy-2-methyl-1-[(3,4,5-trimethoxyphenyl)methyl]isoquinolinium] dichloride
- CAS Number: 73909–73–6
- ChemSpider: 4946765

Chemical and physical data
- Formula: C_{62}H_{78}Cl_{2}N_{2}O_{14}
- Molar mass: 1146.21 g·mol^{−1}
- 3D model (JSmol): Interactive image
- SMILES: [Cl-].[Cl-].O=C(OCCC[N+]2(C)C(c1cc(OC)c(OC)cc1CC2)Cc3cc(OC)c(OC)c(OC)c3)\C=C\c4ccc(cc4)\C=C\C(=O)OCCC[N+]6(C(c5c(cc(OC)c(OC)c5)CC6)Cc7cc(OC)c(OC)c(OC)c7)C
- InChI: InChI=1S/C62H78N2O14.2ClH/c1-63(27-23-45-37-51(67-3)53(69-5)39-47(45)49(63)31-43-33-55(71-7)61(75-11)56(34-43)72-8)25-13-29-77-59(65)21-19-41-15-17-42(18–16–41)20-22-60(66)78-30-14-26-64(2)28-24-46-38-52(68-4)54(70-6)40-48(46)50(64)32-44-35-57(73-9)62(76-12)58(36-44)74-10;;/h15-22,33-40,49-50H,13-14,23-32H2,1-12H3;2*1H/q+2;;/p-2/b21-19+,22-20+;; Key:UNQYVYCAHVEHIT-JXYRNBIZSA-L

BW A444U was an experimental neuromuscular blocking drug or skeletal muscle relaxant in the category of non-depolarizing neuromuscular-blocking drugs, intended to be used adjunctively in surgical anesthesia to facilitate endotracheal intubation and to provide skeletal muscle relaxation during surgery or mechanical ventilation. It was synthesized and developed in the early 1980s.

BW A444U represented the first-generation of tetrahydroisoquinoline neuromuscular-blocking drugs that are nicotinic acetylcholine receptor antagonists or antinicotinics. It was an intermediate-duration non-depolarizing neuromuscular-blocking drug or skeletal muscle relaxant. It was synthesized by Mary M. Jackson and James C. Wisowaty, PhD (both chemists within the Chemical Development Laboratories at Burroughs Wellcome Co., Research Triangle Park, NC) in collaboration with John J. Savarese MD (who at the time was an anesthesiologist in the Dept. of Anesthesia, Harvard Medical School at the Massachusetts General Hospital, Boston, MA).

The drug was tested clinically in the early 1980s, and quickly abandoned from further clinical development after a single clinical study, owing primarily to undesirable effects of histamine release when administered at clinically relevant doses.
