= Camalexin =

Names
- Preferred IUPAC name 3-(1,3-Thiazol-2-yl)-1H-indole

Identifiers
CAS Number	135531-86-1
3D model (JSmol)	Interactive image
ChemSpider	552646
ECHA InfoCard	100.236.489
PubChem CID	636970
UNII	QY3Z69LA99
CompTox Dashboard (EPA)	DTXSID901032122
- InChI: InChI=1S/C11H8N2S/c1-2-4-10-8(3-1)9(7-13-10)11-12-5-6-14-11/h1-7,13H Key: IYODIJVWGPRBGQ-UHFFFAOYSA-N; InChI=1/C11H8N2S/c1-2-4-10-8(3-1)9(7-13-10)11-12-5-6-14-11/h1-7,13H Key: IYODIJVWGPRBGQ-UHFFFAOYAV
- SMILES: c1ccc2c(c1)c(c[nH]2)c3nccs3

Properties
Chemical formula	C_{11}H_{8}N_{2}S
Molar mass	200.26 g·mol^{−1}
- Except where otherwise noted, data are given for materials in their standard state (at 25 °C [77 °F], 100 kPa). Infobox references

Camalexin (3-thiazol-2-yl-indole) is a simple indole alkaloid found in the plant species Arabidopsis thaliana. This secondary metabolite functions as a phytoalexin to deter bacterial and fungal pathogens.

== Structure ==
The base structure of camalexin consists of an indole ring derived from tryptophan. The ethanamine moiety attached to the 3 position of the indole ring is subsequently rearranged into a thiazole ring.

== Biosynthesis ==
Most of the enzymes involved in the pathway are known and involved in a metabolon complex. The pathway starts with a tryptophan precursor which is subsequently oxidized by two cytochrome P450 enzymes. The indole-3-acetaldoxime is then converted to indole-3-acetonitrile by another cytochrome P450, CYP71A13. A glutathione conjugate followed by a subsequent unknown enzyme is needed to form dihydrocamalexic acid. A final decarboxylation step by cytochrome P450 CYP71B15, also called phytoalexin deficient4 (PAD3) results in the final product, camalexin.

== Biological activity ==
Camalexin is cytotoxic against aggressive prostate cancer cell lines in vitro.
