= Tubocurarine chloride =

Obsolete muscle relaxant

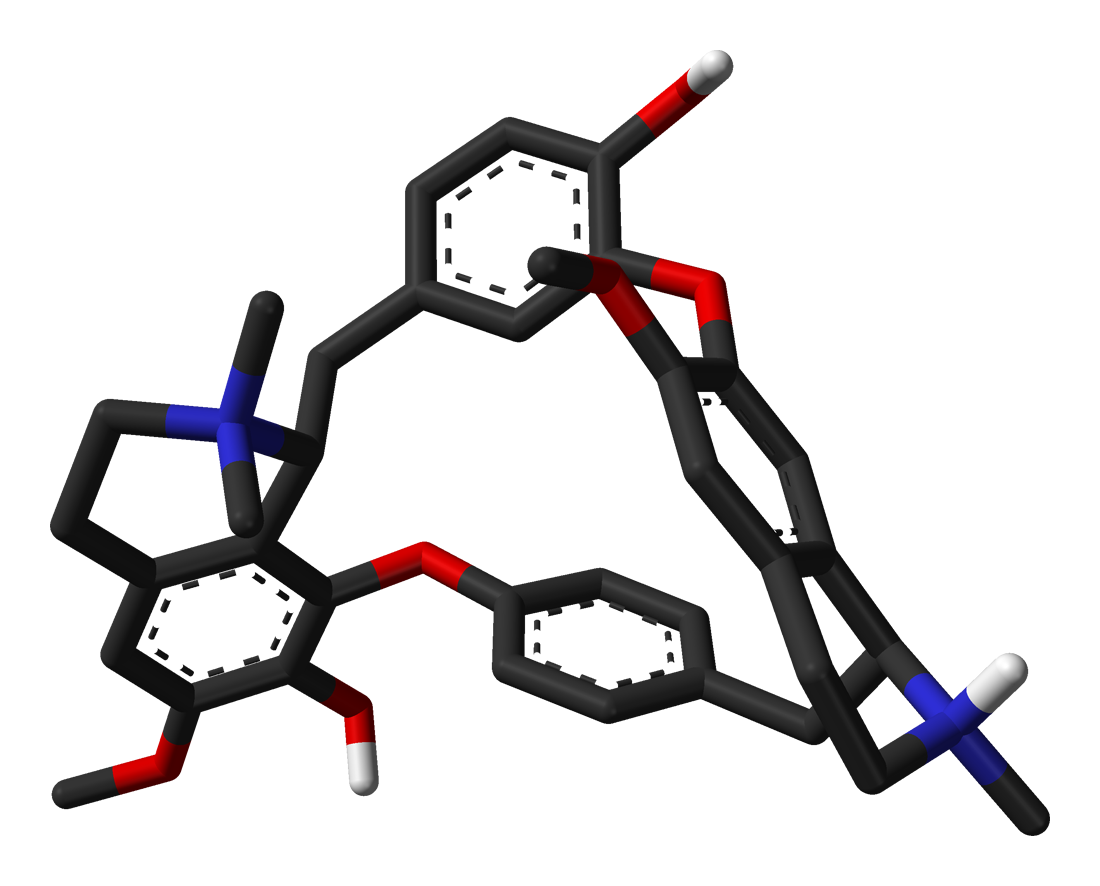

Clinical data
- AHFS/Drugs.com: International Drug Names
- MedlinePlus: a682860
- Pregnancy category: AU: C
- Routes of administration: IV
- ATC code: M03AA02 (WHO)

Legal status
- Legal status: In general: ℞ (Prescription only)

Pharmacokinetic data
- Bioavailability: 100% (IV)
- Protein binding: 50%
- Elimination half-life: 1–2 hours

Identifiers
- IUPAC name: 6,6′-dimethoxy-2,2′,2′-trimethyltubocuraran-2,2′-diium-7′,12′-diol
- CAS Number: 6989-98-6
- PubChem CID: 6000
- IUPHAR/BPS: 2294
- DrugBank: DB01199
- ChemSpider: 5778
- UNII: 900961Z8VR
- ChEBI: CHEBI:9774
- ChEMBL: ChEMBL1687
- CompTox Dashboard (EPA): DTXSID0048393

Chemical and physical data
- Formula: C_{37}H_{42}Cl_{2}N_{2}O_{6}
- Molar mass: 681.65 g·mol^{−1}
- 3D model (JSmol): Interactive image
- SMILES: Oc7ccc1cc7Oc5cc6[C@H](Cc4ccc(Oc2c3[C@@H](C1)[N+](C)(C)CCc3cc(OC)c2O)cc4)[N+](C)(C)CCc6cc5OC
- InChI: InChI=1S/C37H40N2O6/c1-38-14-12-24-19-32(42-4)33-21-27(24)28(38)16-22-6-9-26(10-7-22)44-37-35-25(20-34(43-5)36(37)41)13-15-39(2,3)29(35)17-23-8-11-30(40)31(18-23)45-33/h6-11,18-21,28-29H,12-17H2,1-5H3,(H-,40,41)/p+1/t28-,29+/m0/s1; Key:JFJZZMVDLULRGK-URLMMPGGSA-O

Tubocurarine (also known as d-tubocurarine or DTC) is a toxic benzylisoquinoline alkaloid historically known for its use as an arrow poison. In the mid-1900s, it was used in conjunction with an anesthetic to provide skeletal muscle relaxation during surgery or mechanical ventilation. Safer alternatives, such as cisatracurium and rocuronium, have largely replaced it as an adjunct for clinical anesthesia and it is now rarely used. The specific form used was tubocurarine chloride, its hydrated hydrochloride salt.

== History ==
Tubocurarine is a naturally occurring mono-quaternary alkaloid obtained from the bark of the Menispermaceous South American plant Chondrodendron tomentosum, a climbing vine known to the European world since the Spanish conquest of South America. Curare had been used as a source of arrow poison by South American natives to hunt animals, and they were able to eat the animals' contaminated flesh subsequently without any adverse effects because tubocurarine cannot easily cross mucous membranes. Thus, tubocurarine is effective only if given parenterally, as demonstrated by Bernard, who also showed that the site of its action was at the neuromuscular junction. Virchow and Munter confirmed the paralyzing action was limited to voluntary muscles. In 1943, Oskar Wintersteiner and J. D. Dutcher isolated crystalline d-tubocurarine from curare prepared solely from Chondrodendron tomentosum, confirming the plant as a source of the active alkaloid in some curare preparations. They noted that pure crystalline preparations were needed for physiological and clinical studies in medicine because curare preparations available at that time varied in their botanical origin, composition, and potency.

=== Etymology ===
The word curare comes from a word in the Cariban languages. Tubocurarine is so-called because some of the plant extracts designated curare were stored, and subsequently shipped to Europe, in bamboo tubes. Likewise, curare stored in calabash containers was called calabash curare, although this was usually an extract not of Chondrodendron, but of the Strychnos species S. toxifera, containing a different alkaloid, namely toxiferine. Pot curare was generally a mixture of extracts from various genera in the families Menispermaceae and Loganiaceae. The tripartite classification into "tube", "calabash", and "pot" curares early became untenable, due to inconsistencies in the use of the different types of vessels and the complexities of the dart poison recipes themselves.

=== Use in anesthesia ===
Griffith and Johnson are credited with pioneering the formal clinical introduction of tubocurarine as an adjunct to anesthetic practice on 23 January 1942, at the Montreal Homeopathic Hospital. In this sense, tubocurarine is the prototypical adjunctive neuromuscular non-depolarizing agent. However, others before Griffith and Johnson had attempted use of tubocurarine in several situations: some under controlled study conditions while others not quite controlled and remained unpublished. Regardless, all in all some 30,000 patients had been given tubocurarine by 1941, although it was Griffith and Johnson's 1942 publication that provided the impetus to the standard use of neuromuscular blocking agents in clinical anesthetic practice – a revolution that rapidly metamorphosized into the standard practice of "balanced" anesthesia: the triad of barbiturate hypnosis, light inhalational anesthesia and muscle relaxation. The technique as described by Gray and Halton was widely known as the "Liverpool technique", and became the standard anesthetic technique in England in the 1950s and 1960s for patients of all ages and physical status. Present clinical anesthetic practice still employs the central principle of balanced anesthesia though with some differences to accommodate subsequent technological advances and introductions of new and better gaseous anesthetic, hypnotic and neuromuscular blocking agents, and tracheal intubation, as well as monitoring techniques that were nonexistent in the day of Gray and Halton: pulse oximetry, capnography, peripheral nerve stimulation, noninvasive blood pressure monitoring, etc.

== Chemical properties ==
Structurally, tubocurarine is a benzylisoquinoline derivative. Its structure, when first elucidated in 1948 and for many years, was incorrectly thought to be bis-quaternary: in other words, it was thought to be an N,N-dimethylated alkaloid. In 1970, the correct structure was finally established, showing one of the two nitrogens to be tertiary, actually a mono-N-methylated alkaloid.

=== Biosynthesis ===
Tubocurarine biosynthesis involves a radical coupling of the two enantiomers of N-methylcoclaurine. (R) and (S)-N-methylcoclaurine come from a Mannich-like reaction between dopamine and 4-hydroxyphenylacetaldehyde, facilitated by norcoclaurine synthase (NCS). Both dopamine and 4-hydroxyphenylacetaldehyde originate from L-tyrosine. Methylation of the amine and hydroxyl substituents are facilitated by S-adenosyl methionine (SAM). One methyl group is present on each nitrogen atom prior to the radical coupling. The additional methyl group is transferred to form tubocurarine, with its single quaternary N,N-dimethylamino group.

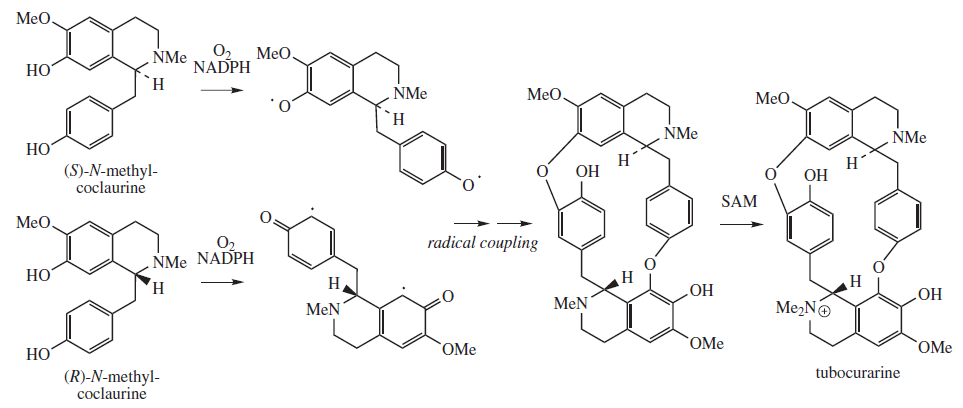
Tubocurarine proposed biosynthesis

== Biological effects ==
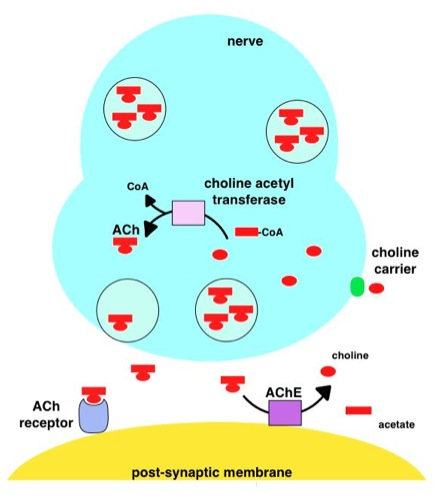
Acetylcholine in the synaptic gap

Without intervention, acetylcholine (ACh) in the peripheral nervous system activates skeletal muscles. Acetylcholine is produced in the body of the neuron by choline acetyltransferase and transported down the axon to the synaptic gap. Tubocurarine chloride acts as an antagonist for the nicotinic acetylcholine receptor (nAChr), meaning it blocks the receptor site from ACh. This may be due to the quaternary amino structural motif found on both molecules.

=== Clinical pharmacology ===
Unna et al. reported the effects of tubocurarine on humans:

Forty-five seconds after the beginning of the injection, heaviness of the eyelids and transitory diplopia were perceived. At the completion of the injection, diplopia became fixed, but could be noticed only when the subject's eyelids were raised by the operator. As curarization proceeded, it seemed to the subject as if the facial muscles, those of the tongue, pharynx, and lower jaw, the muscles of the neck and back, and the muscles of the extremities became relaxed in about that order. Accompanying the paralysis of the pharynx and the jaw muscles, inability of the subject to swallow was noted ... Shortly after the injection was completed the subjects experienced a sensation of increased difficulty in breathing, as if an extra effort was necessary to maintain an adequate respiratory exchange. This sensation was present even though there was no objective evidence of impaired oxygenation or of carbon dioxide retention. It reached its maximum about five minutes after the injection, coinciding with the maximum depression of the vital capacity. In the majority of the experiments the respiratory rate was increased by about 50–100 per cent the first minutes after the injection of any one of the drugs while the tidal volume decreased.

Tubocurarine has a time of onset of around 5 minutes which is relatively slow among neuromuscular-blocking drugs, and has a duration of action of 60 to 120 minutes. It also causes histamine release, now a recognized hallmark of the tetrahydroisoquinolinium class of neuromuscular blocking agents. Histamine release is associated with bronchospasms, hypotension, and salivary secretions, making it dangerous for asthmatics, children, and those who are pregnant or lactating. However, the main disadvantage in the use of tubocurarine is its significant ganglion-blocking effect, that manifests as hypotension, in many patients; this constitutes a relative contraindication to its use in patients with myocardial ischaemia.

Because of the shortcomings of tubocurare, much research effort was undertaken soon after its clinical introduction to find a suitable replacement. The efforts unleashed a multitude of compounds borne from structure-activity relations developed from the tubocurare molecule. Some key compounds that have seen clinical use are identified in the muscle relaxants template box below. Of the many tried as replacements, only a few enjoyed as much popularity as tubocurarine: pancuronium, vecuronium, rocuronium, atracurium, and cisatracurium. Succinylcholine is a widely used muscle relaxant drug which acts by activating, instead of blocking, the ACh receptor.

The potassium channel blocker tetraethylammonium (TEA) has been shown to reverse the effects of tubocurarine. It is thought to do so by increasing ACh release, which counteracts the antagonistic effects of tubocurarine on the ACh receptor.

=== Use as spider bite treatment ===
Spiders of the genus Latrodectus have α-latrotoxin in their venom. The most well known spider in this genus is the black widow spider. α-latrotoxin causes the release of neurotransmitters into the synaptic gap, including acetylcholine. Bites are usually not fatal, but do cause a significant amount of pain in addition to muscle spasms. The venom is the most damaging to nerve endings, but the introduction of d-tubocurarine chloride blocks the nAChr, alleviating pain and muscle spasms while an antivenom can be administered.

== Toxicology ==
An individual administered tubocurarine chloride will be unable to move any voluntary muscles, including the diaphragm. A large enough dose will therefore result in death from respiratory failure unless artificial ventilation is initiated. The LD_{50} for mice and rabbits are 0.13 mg/kg and 0.146 mg/kg intravenously, respectively. It releases histamine and causes hypotension.
