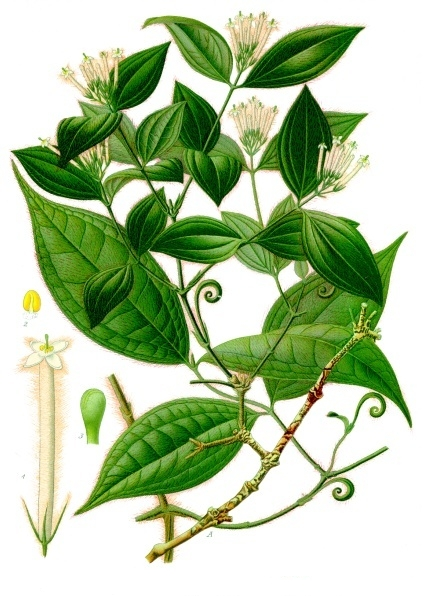
- Botanical illustration

Scientific classification
- Kingdom: Plantae
- Clade: Embryophytes
- Clade: Tracheophytes
- Clade: Spermatophytes
- Clade: Angiosperms
- Clade: Eudicots
- Clade: Asterids
- Order: Gentianales
- Family: Loganiaceae
- Genus: Strychnos
- Species: S. toxifera

Binomial name
- Strychnos toxifera R.H.Schomb. ex Lindl.

Synonyms
- Strychnos syntoxica Sprague & Sandwith

= Strychnos toxifera =

Species of flowering plant

Strychnos toxifera, called bush rope and devil doer, is a species of flowering plant in the genus Strychnos, native to Costa Rica, Panama, Colombia, Ecuador, Venezuela, the Guianas, Brazil, Peru and Bolivia. It is the principal source of calabash or gourd curare.

Macusine B is an alkaloid inhibitor of adrenergic alpha-receptors and tryptamine receptors that can be isolated from Strychnos toxifera.
