= Antispasmodic =

Class of medications

An antispasmodic (synonym: spasmolytic) is a pharmaceutical drug or other agent that suppresses muscle spasms.

== Smooth muscle spasm ==
One type of antispasmodics is used for smooth muscle relaxation, especially in tubular organs of the gastrointestinal tract. The effect is to prevent spasms of the stomach, intestine or urinary bladder. Both dicyclomine and hyoscyamine are antispasmodic due to their anticholinergic action. Both of these drugs have side effects common to anticholinergics and can worsen gastroesophageal reflux disease (GERD).

Papaverine is an opium alkaloid used to treat visceral spasms, particularly those of the intestines. Mebeverine is a papaverine analog and spasmolytic with a strong and selective action on the smooth muscles of the gastrointestinal tract, particularly of the colon. Despite being anticholinergic, it does not have the systemic anticholinergic side effects seen in other such drugs.

Peppermint oil has been traditionally used as an antispasmodic, and a review of studies on the topic found that it "could be efficacious for symptom relief in IBS" (as an antispasmodic) although more carefully controlled studies are needed. A later study showed it is an effective antispasmodic when applied topically to the intestine during endoscopy.

Bamboo shoots have been used for gastrointestinal and antispasmodic symptoms.

Anisotropine, atropine, clidinium bromide are also the most commonly used modern antispasmodics.

== Skeletal muscle spasm ==
Pharmacotherapy may be used for acute musculoskeletal conditions when physical therapy is unavailable or has not been fully successful. Another class of antispasmodics for such treatment includes cyclobenzaprine, carisoprodol, diazepam, orphenadrine, and tizanidine. Meprobamate is another effective antispasmodic which was first introduced for clinical usage in 1955 mainly as an anxiolytic and soon afterward became a blockbuster psychotropic drug. While clinical usage of meprobamate has largely become obsolete since the development of benzodiazepines due to its liability for developing physical dependence and severe toxicity during instances of acute overdose, it is still manufactured and available by prescription. Carisoprodol is similar to meprobamate as they both belong to the carbamate drug class and meprobamate is a clinically significant active metabolite of carisoprodol, although carisoprodol itself possesses additional antispasmodic properties which are distinct from its metabolites. Effectiveness has not been clearly shown for metaxalone, methocarbamol, chlorzoxazone, baclofen, or dantrolene. Applicable conditions include acute back or neck pain, or pain after an injury. Long-term use of muscle relaxants in such cases is poorly supported.

Spasm may also be seen in movement disorders featuring spasticity in neurologic conditions such as cerebral palsy, multiple sclerosis, and spinal cord disease. Medications are commonly used for spastic movement disorders, but research has not shown functional benefit for some drugs. Some studies have shown that medications have been effective in decreasing spasticity, but that this has not been accompanied by functional benefits. Medications such as baclofen, tizanidine, and dantrolene have been used.

== See also ==
- Muscarinic antagonist
- Parasympatholytic
- Phloroglucinol
- Spasticity
- Propantheline bromide
