= Ernest J. Briskey =

American food scientist

Ernest Joseph Briskey (March 30, 1931 – June 24, 2006) was an American food scientist who was involved in the biological studies on meat tissue during the slaughtering process. He also developed the use of meat science as a career, including the charter of the American Meat Science Association, both at the University of Wisconsin–Madison and at Oregon State University.

== Education and career ==
A native of Wisconsin, Briskey earned his BS degree from the University of Wisconsin–Madison in 1952 in meat and animal science, then earned his MS in animal science from the Ohio State University in 1955. Briskey finally earned his Ph.D. from Wisconsin in biochemistry and meat and animal science in 1958.

After earning his PhD, Briskey then joined the faculty of meat and animal science department at Wisconsin where he worked his way up to professor rank and became director of the Institute of Muscle Biology. In 1970, Briskey left Wisconsin to become Vice President, Technical and Administration at Campbell Soup in Camden, New Jersey, a position he held until he became Dean of Agricultural Science at Oregon State University from 1979 to 1987. Briskey stepped down as dean in 1987, but remained as a professor in the animal science department until his 1998 retirement. While a dean at Oregon State, Briskey worked with the United States Department of State in both Thailand (1984–86) and Kuwait (1986–88) as a science advisor. Following his retirement, Briskey moved to Waunakee, Wisconsin.

== Research involvement ==
Briskey was involved in studies of meat processing involving muscle biology, which is what changes are involved in slaughterhouse operations that change the meat into what consumers want. Two terms were developed by Briskey that are used in the meat industry about problems that occur during slaughter:

- DFD (Dark, film, and dry): This results from meat that has a pH higher than normal. A dead carcass of meat is a dark cutter and is caused by animal stresses prior to slaughter.
- PSE (Pale, soft, and exudative): This results from meat that has a pH lower than normal. If meat comes out at high temperature and low pH, it will be soft and mushy from their inability to retain water, and results in light reflecting off the meat's surface.

== Professional involvement ==
Briskey's research and involvement were important in establishing the American Meat Science Association, where he earned their research award in 1966 and their service award in 1978. He was also an active member of the Institute of Food Technologists (IFT) where he won the Samuel Cate Prescott Award in 1965, the Nicholas Appert Award in 1975, and a Fellow in 1977. Briskey also served as scientific editor of the Journal of Food Science in 1970-71 and as IFT President in 1975-76.

== Additional honors ==
- Wisconsin Meat Industry Hall of Fame: Inducted May 4, 2000.
- Oregon State University College of Agricultural Sciences Diamond Pioneer Class of 2006: Posthumous induction on October 26, 2006.

== Death ==
Briskey died on June 24, 2006, after a brief battle with leukemia in Madison, Wisconsin.
