= Mephenoxalone =

Muscle relaxant

Clinical data
- Trade names: Dorsiflex, Moderamin, Control-OM
- AHFS/Drugs.com: International Drug Names
- ATC code: N05BX01 (WHO)

Legal status
- Legal status: BR: Class C1 (Other controlled substances)

Identifiers
- IUPAC name: 5-[(2-methoxyphenoxy)methyl]-1,3-oxazolidin-2-one
- CAS Number: 70-07-5
- PubChem CID: 6257
- ChemSpider: 6021
- UNII: CZ87T54W8W
- KEGG: D07318
- ChEMBL: ChEMBL2104790
- CompTox Dashboard (EPA): DTXSID9023255
- ECHA InfoCard: 100.000.658

Chemical and physical data
- Formula: C_{11}H_{13}NO_{4}
- Molar mass: 223.228 g·mol^{−1}
- 3D model (JSmol): Interactive image
- SMILES: O=C2OC(COc1c(OC)cccc1)CN2
- InChI: InChI=1S/C11H13NO4/c1-14-9-4-2-3-5-10(9)15-7-8-6-12-11(13)16-8/h2-5,8H,6-7H2,1H3,(H,12,13); Key:ZMNSRFNUONFLSP-UHFFFAOYSA-N

Mephenoxalone (trade names Dorsiflex, Moderamin, Control-OM) is a muscle relaxant and mild anxiolytic. It inhibits neuron transmission, relaxing skeletal muscles by inhibiting the reflex arc. As the effect of muscle relaxation, mephenoxalone affects mental condition, and is also a treatment for nervousness and anxiety.

== See also ==
- Chlorphenesin
- Guaifenesin
- Mephenesin
- Metaxalone
- Methocarbamol
