= Norgesic =

Muscle relaxant

Clinical data
- AHFS/Drugs.com: Micromedex Detailed Consumer Information
- MedlinePlus: a682162
- Routes of administration: Oral

Identifiers
- CAS Number: 509146-28-5

Norgesic is the brand name of a muscle relaxant produced by Galt Pharmaceuticals. The generic is a combination of 385 mg of aspirin, 25 mg of orphenadrine citrate and 30 mg of caffeine.

It was discontinued in the United States in October 2015 but was returned to the United States market in 2022 and is still available in Scandinavia, Austria, Greece, Thailand, Australia and Hong Kong. In some countries Norgesic has a different pharmaceutical combination. For example in Greece the combination is 450 mg of paracetamol and 35 mg of orphenadrine citrate.
