= Cyclobenzaprine =

Muscle relaxant medication

- Molecular structure of cyclobenzaprine

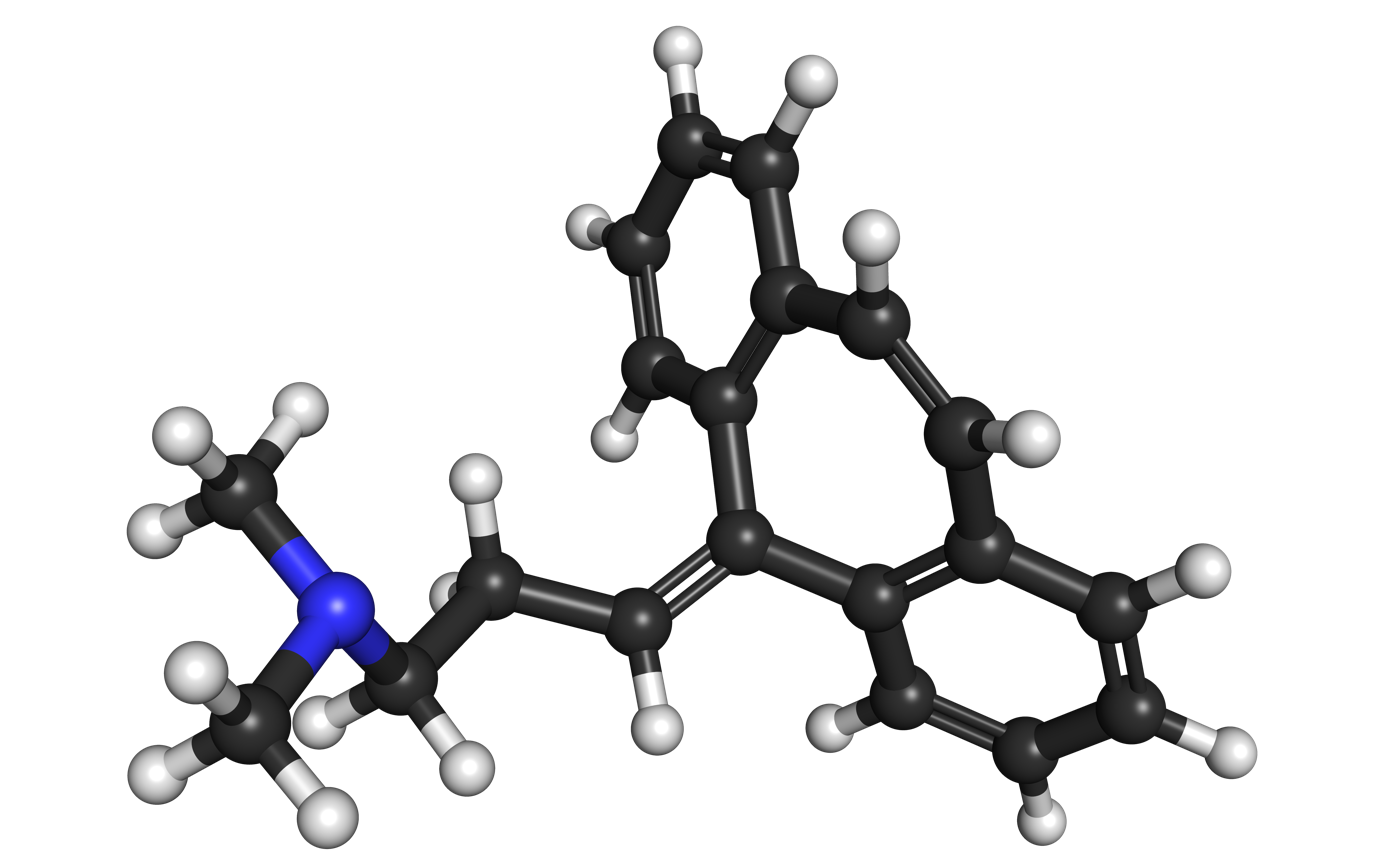
- 3D representation of a cyclobenzaprine molecule

Clinical data
- Trade names: Flexeril, Amrix, others
- AHFS/Drugs.com: Monograph
- MedlinePlus: a682514
- License data: US DailyMed: Cyclobenzaprine
- Routes of administration: By mouth
- ATC code: M03BX08 (WHO)

Legal status
- Legal status: US: ℞-only; In general: ℞ (Prescription only)

Pharmacokinetic data
- Bioavailability: 33–55%
- Protein binding: 93%
- Metabolism: major: CYP3A4, CYP1A2; minor: CYP2D6, N-demethylation
- Metabolites: Norcyclobenzaprine
- Elimination half-life: 32 hours (extended-release, range 8–37 hours), 18 hours (immediate release, range 8–37 hours)
- Excretion: Kidney

Identifiers
- IUPAC name: 3-(5H-dibenzo[a,d]cyclohepten-5-ylidene)-N,N-dimethyl-propan-1-amine
- CAS Number: 303-53-7
- PubChem CID: 2895
- IUPHAR/BPS: 7152
- DrugBank: DB00924
- ChemSpider: 2792
- UNII: 69O5WQQ5TI
- KEGG: D07758
- ChEBI: CHEBI:3996
- ChEMBL: ChEMBL669
- CompTox Dashboard (EPA): DTXSID0046933
- ECHA InfoCard: 100.005.588

Chemical and physical data
- Formula: C_{20}H_{21}N
- Molar mass: 275.395 g·mol^{−1}
- 3D model (JSmol): Interactive image
- SMILES: c3cc\2c(\C=C/c1c(cccc1)C/2=C/CCN(C)C)cc3
- InChI: InChI=1S/C20H21N/c1-21(2)15-7-12-20-18-10-5-3-8-16(18)13-14-17-9-4-6-11-19(17)20/h3-6,8-14H,7,15H2,1-2H3; Key:JURKNVYFZMSNLP-UHFFFAOYSA-N

Cyclobenzaprine, sold under the brand name Flexeril among others, is a muscle relaxer used for muscle spasms from musculoskeletal conditions of sudden onset. It is not useful in cerebral palsy. It is taken by mouth.

Common side effects include headache, tiredness, dizziness, and dry mouth. Serious side effects may include an irregular heartbeat. There is no evidence of harm in pregnancy, but it has not been well studied in this population. It should not be used together with MAOIs. How it works is unclear. In any case, it is known to inhibit serotonin and norepinephrine reuptake and to block serotonin, adrenergic, histamine, and muscarinic acetylcholine receptors. Chemically, it is very similar to tricyclic antidepressants like amitriptyline.

Cyclobenzaprine was approved for medical use in the United States in 1977. It is available by prescription as a generic medication. In 2023, it was the 47th most commonly prescribed medication in the United States, with more than 13 million prescriptions. It was not available in the United Kingdom as of 2012.

== Medical uses ==
Cyclobenzaprine is used, in conjunction with physical therapy, to treat muscle spasms that occur because of acute musculoskeletal conditions. After sustaining an injury, muscle spasms occur to stabilize the affected body part, which may increase pain to prevent further damage. Cyclobenzaprine is used to treat such muscle spasms associated with acute, painful musculoskeletal conditions. It decreases pain in the first two weeks, peaking in the first few days, but has no proven benefit after two weeks. Since no benefit is proven beyond that, therapy should not be continued long-term. It is the best-studied muscle relaxer. It is not useful for spasticity due to neurologic conditions such as cerebral palsy. It may also be used along with other treatments for tetanus.

=== Comparison to other medications ===
Cyclobenzaprine has been found just as effective as tizanidine, orphenadrine, and carisoprodol in the treatment of acute lower back pain, although none have been proven to be effective for long-term use (beyond two weeks of treatment). No differences in pain or spasm scores were noted among these agents, nor when compared to benzodiazepines. However, nonbenzodiazepine (including cyclobenzaprine) treatment was found to have a lower risk of medication abuse and continuation of use against medical advice. Side effects such as sedation and ataxia are also less pronounced with nonbenzodiazepine antispasmodics.

In a study on the treatment of musculoskeletal pain treatment with cyclobenzaprine alone or in combination with ibuprofen, no significant differences in pain scores were noted among the three treatment groups. Peak benefit was found to occur on day seven of the treatment for all groups.

== Side effects ==
Cyclobenzaprine results in increased rates of drowsiness (38%), dry mouth (24%), and dizziness (10%). Drowsiness and dry mouth appear to intensify with increasing dose.

Agitation is a common side effect observed, especially in the elderly. Some experts believe that cyclobenzaprine should be avoided in elderly patients because it can cause confusion, delirium, and cognitive impairment. In general, the National Committee for Quality Assurance recommends avoiding the use of cyclobenzaprine in the elderly because of the potential for more severe side effects.

Dysphagia, a life-threatening side-effect, may rarely occur. Treatment protocols and support should follow the same as for any structurally related tricyclics, such as tricyclic antidepressants.

== Overdose ==
The most common effects of overdose are drowsiness and tachycardia. Rare but potentially critical complications are cardiac arrest, abnormal heart rhythms, severe low blood pressure, seizures, and neuroleptic malignant syndrome. Life-threatening overdose is rare, however, as the median lethal dose is about 338 milligrams/kilogram in mice and 425 mg/kg in rats. The potential harm is increased when central nervous system depressants and antidepressants are also used; deliberate overdose often includes other drugs.

== Interactions ==
Cyclobenzaprine has major contraindications with monoamine oxidase inhibitors (MAOIs). At least one study also found increased risk of serotonin syndrome when cyclobenzaprine was taken with the serotonergic drugs duloxetine or phenelzine.

These substances may interact with cyclobenzaprine:

- Central nervous system depressants (e.g. alcohol, opioids, benzodiazepines, nonbenzodiazepines, phenothiazines, carbamates, barbiturates, major tranquilizers)
- Monoamine oxidase inhibitors taken within two weeks of cyclobenzaprine may result in serious, life-threatening side effects.

Cyclobenzaprine may affect the medications used in surgical sedation and some surgeons request that patients temporarily discontinue its use prior to surgery.

== Pharmacology ==
=== Pharmacodynamics ===
Cyclobenzaprine (and metabolite)
| Site | CBP | NCBP | Action |
|---|---|---|---|
| SERT | 108 | ND | Inhibitor |
| NET | 36 | ND | Inhibitor |
| DAT | 5489 | ND | Inhibitor |
| 5-HT_{1A} | 5300 | 3200 | Agonist |
| 5-HT_{2A} | 5.2–29 | 13 | Antagonist |
| 5-HT_{2B} | 100–154 | ND | Antagonist |
| 5-HT_{2C} | 5.2–57 | 43 | Antagonist |
| 5-HT_{6} | 145 | ND | Antagonist |
| 5-HT_{7} | 151 | ND | Antagonist |
| α_{1A} | 5.6 | 34 | ND |
| α_{2A} | 4.3 | 6.4 | Antagonist |
| α_{2B} | 21 | 150 | ND |
| α_{2C} | 21 | 48 | ND |
| H_{1} | 1.3 | 5.6 | Antagonist |
| M_{1} | 7.9 | 30 | Antagonist |
| M_{2} | High | ND | Antagonist |
| M_{3} | High | ND | Antagonist |
| M_{4} | Negligible | ND | – |
| M_{5} | Negligible | ND | – |
Values are K_{i} (nM), unless otherwise noted. The smaller the value, the more strongly the drug binds to the site.

Cyclobenzaprine is a centrally acting muscle relaxant with a chemical structure that is very similar to those of tricyclic antidepressants like amitriptyline and imipramine.

Its known actions include serotonin–norepinephrine reuptake inhibition, serotonin 5-HT_{2A}, 5-HT_{2B}, 5-HT_{2C}, 5-HT_{6}, and 5-HT_{7} receptor antagonism, α_{1}- and α_{2}-adrenergic receptor antagonism, histamine H_{1} receptor noncompetitive antagonism, and muscarinic acetylcholine receptor antagonism. In terms of its antimuscarinic activity, it is said to be an antagonist of the muscarinic acetylcholine M_{1}, M_{2}, and M_{3} receptors, but not of the muscarinic acetylcholine M_{4} or M_{5} receptor.

The mechanism of action of cyclobenzaprine as a muscle relaxant is unknown. However, it may work through modulating the serotonergic and noradrenergic systems. The antihistamine activity of cyclobenzaprine is thought to play a major role in its sedative effects. Similarly to tricyclic antidepressants, cyclobenzaprine shows antidepressant-like effects in animals.

=== Pharmacokinetics ===
Cyclobenzaprine has an oral bioavailability of about 55% and approximately 93% is bound to proteins in plasma. Its metabolite norcyclobenzaprine (NCBP) is active. The elimination half-life of cyclobenzaprine is 18 hours and it has a clearance of 0.7 L/min.

== Chemistry ==
Cyclobenzaprine is a tricyclic compound of the dibenzocycloheptene group. It is very similar in chemical structure to tricyclic antidepressants like amitriptyline and imipramine, which are likewise dibenzocycloheptenes. Cyclobenzaprine differs from amitriptyline in structure only by the presence of a single double bond within the tricyclic ring system, being 10,11-dehydroamitriptyline.

== Society and culture ==
=== Formulations ===
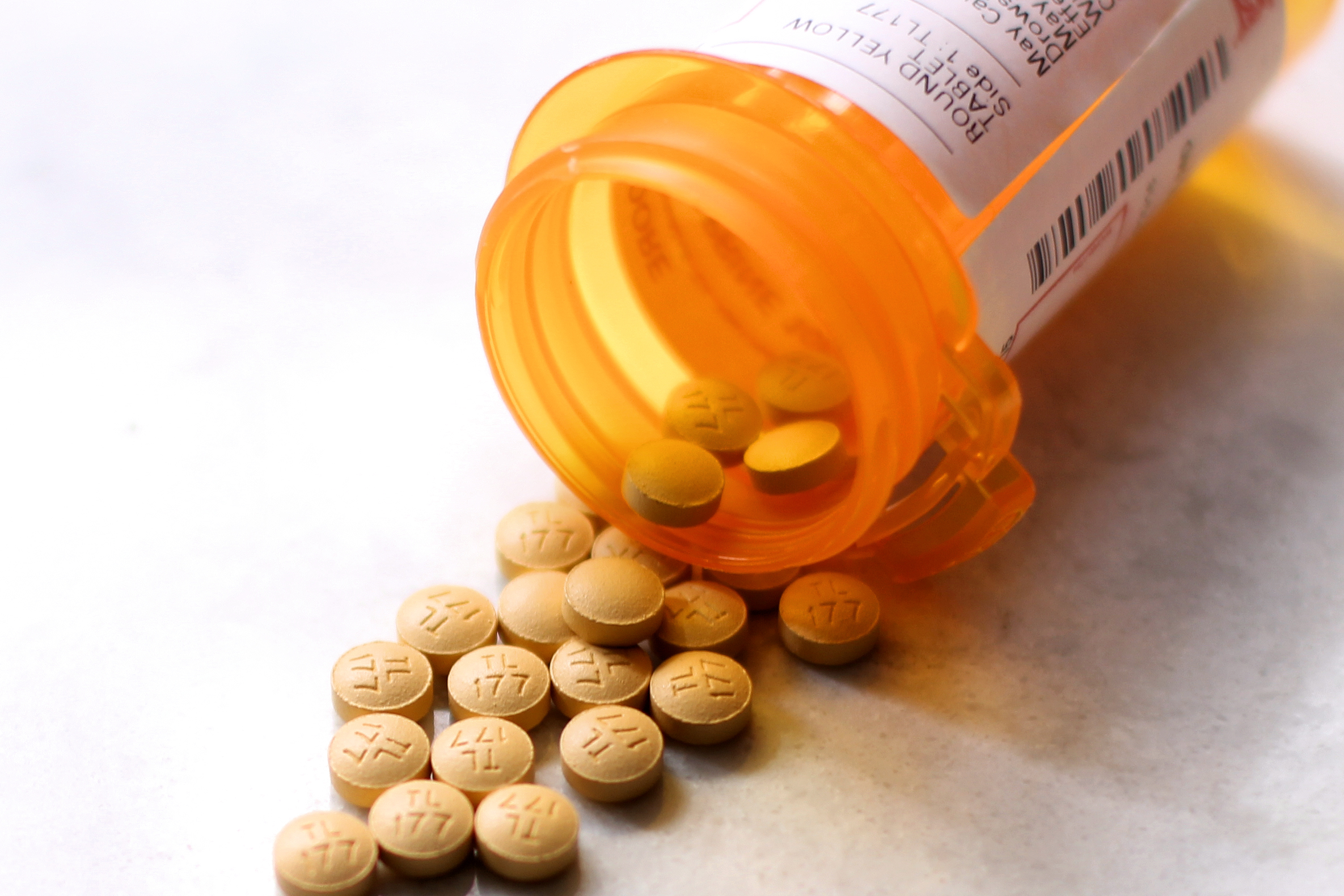
Cyclobenzaprine 10mg tablets

By mouth, cyclobenzaprine is marketed as Apo-Cyclobenzaprine, Fexmid, Flexeril and Novo-Cycloprine. It is available in generic form. A once-a-day, extended-release formulation, Amrix, is available. Cyclobenzaprine is also used by compounding pharmacies in topical creams.

== Research ==
=== Fibromyalgia ===
A 2004 review found benefit for fibromyalgia symptoms, with a reported number needed to treat of 4.8 (meaning that 1 person out of every 4.8 benefits from treatment) for pain reduction, but no change in fatigue or tender points. A 2009 Cochrane review found insufficient evidence to justify its use in myofascial pain syndrome.

Two Phase 3 clinical trials reported that an experimental sublingual formulation of cyclobenzaprine, TNX-102 SL, was able to reduce pain and improve sleep quality in patients with fibromyalgia. The RESILIENT trial reported significant reductions in daily pain and improvements in various fibromyalgia symptoms, including fatigue and depressive symptoms, compared to placebo. A separate Phase 3 clinical trial evaluated TNX-102 SL in patients with military-related post-traumatic stress disorder (PTSD) and reported the drug did not provide a sustained, significant improvement in overall PTSD severity, but it did demonstrate improvements in sleep quality during the 12-week trial.

On August 15, 2025, the FDA approved TNX-102 SL under the name Tonmya.
