= Mephenesin =

Muscle relaxer & antidote for strychnine poisoning

Clinical data
- AHFS/Drugs.com: International Drug Names
- ATC code: M03BX06 (WHO)

Identifiers
- IUPAC name: 3-(2-methylphenoxy)propane-1,2-diol
- CAS Number: 59-47-2
- PubChem CID: 4059
- ChemSpider: 3919
- UNII: 7B8PIR2954
- KEGG: D02595
- ChEMBL: ChEMBL229128
- NIAID ChemDB: 017830
- CompTox Dashboard (EPA): DTXSID4023254
- ECHA InfoCard: 100.000.389

Chemical and physical data
- Formula: C_{10}H_{14}O_{3}
- Molar mass: 182.219 g·mol^{−1}
- 3D model (JSmol): Interactive image
- SMILES: O(c1ccccc1C)CC(O)CO
- InChI: InChI=1S/C10H14O3/c1-8-4-2-3-5-10(8)13-7-9(12)6-11/h2-5,9,11-12H,6-7H2,1H3; Key:JWDYCNIAQWPBHD-UHFFFAOYSA-N

Mephenesin (INN), also called myanesin, is a centrally acting muscle relaxant. It can be used as an antidote for strychnine poisoning. Mephenesin however presents with the major drawbacks of having a short duration of action and a much greater effect on the spinal cord than the brain, resulting in pronounced respiratory depression at clinical doses and therefore a very low therapeutic index. It is especially dangerous and potentially fatal in combination with alcohol and other depressants. Mephenesin was the inspiration for the synthesis of a derivative of 1,3-propanediol, meprobamate, by Bernard Ludwig and Frank Berger,. Mephenesin is no longer available in North America but is used in Italy and a few other countries. Its use has largely been replaced by the related drug methocarbamol, which is better absorbed.

Mephenesin may be an NMDA receptor antagonist. Mephenesin was previously used in France as an OTC muscle relaxant called Décontractyl but was taken out of production by Sanofi Aventis and due to a French Health Ministry decree in July 2019.

== See also ==
- Carisoprodol
- Chlorphenesin
- Guaifenesin
- Mephenoxalone
- Methocarbamol
- Prenderol
