= Azumolene =

Chemical compound

Identifiers
- IUPAC name: 1-[(E)-[5-(4-bromophenyl)-1,3-oxazol-2-yl]methylideneamino]imidazolidine-2,4-dione
- CAS Number: 64748-79-4
- PubChem CID: 9568620
- ChemSpider: 7843329
- UNII: 5U7IO9CV80
- ChEBI: CHEBI:143225
- ChEMBL: ChEMBL315108
- CompTox Dashboard (EPA): DTXSID20867096

Chemical and physical data
- Formula: C_{13}H_{9}BrN_{4}O_{3}
- Molar mass: 349.144 g·mol^{−1}
- 3D model (JSmol): Interactive image
- SMILES: C1C(=O)NC(=O)N1/N=C/C2=NC=C(O2)C3=CC=C(C=C3)Br
- InChI: InChI=1S/C13H9BrN4O3/c14-9-3-1-8(2-4-9)10-5-15-12(21-10)6-16-18-7-11(19)17-13(18)20/h1-6H,7H2,(H,17,19,20)/b16-6+; Key:SEGCNGONCZQFDW-OMCISZLKSA-N

Azumolene is an experimental drug which is a derivative of dantrolene. In animal studies, azumolene showed similar efficacy to dantrolene at controlling symptoms of malignant hyperthermia but with better water solubility and lower toxicity, albeit with lower potency.
