= Malignant hyperthermia =

Severe reaction to general anesthesia

- Other names: Malignant hyperpyrexia, anesthesia related hyperthermia
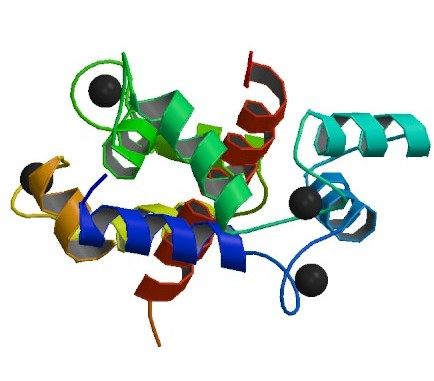
- Abnormalities in the ryanodine receptor 1 gene are commonly detected in people who have experienced an episode of malignant hyperthermia
- Specialty: Anesthesiology, critical care medicine
- Symptoms: Muscle rigidity, high body temperature, fast heart rate
- Complications: Rhabdomyolysis, high blood potassium
- Causes: Volatile anesthetic agents or succinylcholine in those who are susceptible
- Diagnostic method: Based on symptoms and situation, caffeine-halothane contracture test
- Differential diagnosis: Sepsis, anaphylaxis, serotonin syndrome, neuroleptic malignant syndrome
- Prevention: Avoiding potential triggers in those susceptible
- Treatment: Dantrolene, supportive care
- Prognosis: Risk of death: 5% (treatment), 75% (no treatment)
- Frequency: ~1 in 25,000 cases where anesthetic gases are used

Malignant hyperthermia (MH) is a type of severe reaction that occurs in response to particular medications used during general anesthesia, among those who are susceptible. Symptoms include muscle rigidity, fever, and a fast heart rate. Complications can include muscle breakdown and high blood potassium. Most people who are susceptible to MH are generally unaffected when not exposed to triggering agents.

Exposure to triggering agents (certain volatile anesthetic agents or succinylcholine) can lead to the development of MH in those who are susceptible. Susceptibility can occur due to at least six genetic mutations, with the most common one being of the RYR1 gene. These genetic variations are often inherited in an autosomal dominant manner. The condition may also occur as a new mutation or be associated with a number of inherited muscle diseases, such as central core disease.

In susceptible individuals, the medications induce the release of stored calcium ions within muscle cells. The resulting increase in calcium concentrations within the cells cause the muscle fibers to contract. This generates excessive heat and results in metabolic acidosis. Diagnosis is based on symptoms in the appropriate situation. Family members may be tested to see if they are susceptible by muscle biopsy or genetic testing.

Treatment is with dantrolene and rapid cooling along with other supportive measures. The avoidance of potential triggers is recommended in susceptible people. The condition affects one in 5,000 to 50,000 cases where people are given anesthetic gases. Males are more often affected than females. The risk of death with proper treatment is about 5% while without it is around 75%. While cases that appear similar to MH have been documented since the early 20th century, the condition was only formally recognized in 1960.

== Signs and symptoms ==
The typical signs of malignant hyperthermia are due to a hypercatabolic state, which presents as a very high temperature, an increased heart rate and abnormally rapid breathing, increased carbon dioxide production, increased oxygen consumption, mixed acidosis, rigid muscles, and rhabdomyolysis. These signs can develop any time during the administration of the anesthetic triggering agents. Rarely, signs may develop up to 40 minutes after the end of anaesthesia.

== Causes ==
Malignant hyperthermia is a disorder that can be considered a gene–environment interaction. In most people with malignant hyperthermia susceptibility, they have few or no symptoms unless they are exposed to a triggering agent. The most common triggering agents are volatile anesthetic gases, such as halothane, sevoflurane, desflurane, isoflurane, enflurane or the depolarizing muscle relaxants suxamethonium and decamethonium used primarily in general anesthesia. In rare cases, the biological stresses of physical exercise or heat may be the trigger. In fact, malignant hyperthermia susceptibility (MHS), predisposed by mutations in the skeletal muscle calcium release channel (RYR1), is one of the most severe heat-related illnesses. The MHS-associated heat susceptibilities predominantly affect children and metabolically active young adults, often leading to life- threatening hypermetabolic responses to heat.

Other anesthetic drugs do not trigger malignant hyperthermia. Some examples of drugs that don't cause MH include local anesthetics (lidocaine, bupivacaine, mepivacaine), opiates (morphine, fentanyl), ketamine, barbiturates, nitrous oxide, propofol, etomidate, and benzodiazepines. The nondepolarizing muscle relaxants pancuronium, cisatracurium, atracurium, mivacurium, vecuronium and rocuronium also are generally thought to be safe for patients MH.

There is mounting evidence that some individuals with malignant hyperthermia susceptibility may develop MH with exercise and/or on exposure to hot environments.

=== Genetics ===
Malignant hyperthermia's inheritance is autosomal dominant with variable penetrance. The defect is typically located on the long arm of chromosome 19 (19q13.2) involving the ryanodine receptor. More than 25 different mutations in this gene are linked with malignant hyperthermia. These mutations tend to cluster in one of three domains within the protein, designated MH1-3. MH1 and MH2 are located in the N-terminus of the protein, which interacts with L-type calcium channels and Ca^{2+}. MH3 is located in the transmembrane forming C-terminus. This region is important for allowing Ca^{2+} passage through the protein following opening.

Chromosome 7q and chromosome 17 have also been implicated. It has also been postulated that MH and central core disease may be allelic and thus can be co-inherited.

== Pathophysiology ==
=== Disease mechanism ===
In a large proportion (50–70%) of cases, the propensity for malignant hyperthermia is due to a mutation of the ryanodine receptor (type 1), located on the sarcoplasmic reticulum (SR), the organelle within skeletal muscle cells that stores calcium. RYR1 opens in response to conformational changes in the L-type calcium channels following membrane depolarisation, thereby resulting in a drastic increase in intracellular calcium levels and muscle contraction. RYR1 has two sites believed to be important for reacting to changing Ca^{2+} concentrations: the A-site and the I-site. The A-site is a high affinity Ca^{2+} binding site that mediates RYR1 opening. The I-site is a lower affinity site that mediates the protein's closing. Caffeine, halothane, and other triggering agents act by drastically increasing the affinity of the A-site for Ca^{2+} and concomitantly decreasing the affinity of the I-site in mutant proteins. Mg^{2+} also affect RYR1 activity, causing the protein to close by acting at either the A- or I-sites. In MH mutant proteins, the affinity for Mg^{2+} at either one of these sites is greatly reduced. The result of these alterations is greatly increased Ca^{2+} release due to a lowered activation and heightened deactivation threshold. The process of sequestering this excess Ca^{2+} consumes large amounts of adenosine triphosphate (ATP), the main cellular energy carrier, and generates the excessive heat (hyperthermia) that is the hallmark of the disease. The muscle cell is damaged by the depletion of ATP and possibly the high temperatures, and cellular constituents "leak" into the circulation, including potassium, myoglobin, creatine, phosphate and creatine kinase.

The other known causative gene for MH is CACNA1S, which encodes an L-type voltage-gated calcium channel α-subunit. There are two known mutations in this protein, both affecting the same residue, R1086. This residue is located in the large intracellular loop connecting domains 3 and 4, a domain possibly involved in negatively regulating RYR1 activity. When these mutant channels are expressed in human embryonic kidney (HEK 293) cells, the resulting channels are five times more sensitive to activation by caffeine (and presumably halothane) and activate at 5–10mV more hyperpolarized. Furthermore, cells expressing these channels have an increased basal cytosolic Ca^{2+} concentration. As these channels interact with and activate RYR1, these alterations result in a drastic increase of intracellular Ca^{2+}, and, thereby, muscle excitability.

Other mutations causing MH have been identified, although in most cases the relevant gene remains to be identified.

=== Animal model ===
Research into malignant hyperthermia was limited until the discovery of "porcine stress syndrome" (PSS) in Danish Landrace and other pig breeds selected for muscling, a condition in which stressed pigs develop "pale, soft, exudative" flesh (a manifestation of the effects of malignant hyperthermia) rendering their meat less marketable at slaughter. This "awake triggering" was not observed in humans, and initially cast doubts on the value of the animal model, but subsequently, susceptible humans were discovered to "awake trigger" (develop malignant hyperthermia) in stressful situations. This supported the use of the pig model for research. Pig farmers use halothane cones in swine yards to expose piglets to halothane. Those that die were MH-susceptible, thus saving the farmer the expense of raising a pig whose meat he would not be able to market. This also reduced the use of breeding stock carrying the genes for PSS. The condition in swine is also due to a defect in ryanodine receptors.

Gillard et al. discovered the causative mutation in humans only after similar mutations had first been described in pigs.

Horses also develop malignant hyperthermia. A causative mutated allele, ryanodine receptor 1 gene (RyR1) at nucleotide C7360G, generating a R2454G amino acid substitution. has been identified in the American Quarter Horse and breeds with Quarter Horse ancestry, inherited as an autosomal dominant. It can be caused by overwork, anesthesia, or stress. In dogs, its inheritance is autosomal recessive.

An MH mouse has been constructed, bearing the R163C mutation prevalent in humans. These mice display signs similar to human MH patients, including sensitivity to halothane (increased respiration, body temperature, and death). Blockade of RYR1 by dantrolene prevents adverse reaction to halothane in these mice, as with humans. Muscle from these mice also shows increased K^{+}-induced depolarization and an increased caffeine sensitivity.

== Diagnosis ==
=== During an attack ===
The earliest signs may include: masseter muscle contracture following administration of succinylcholine, a rise in end-tidal carbon dioxide concentration (despite increased minute ventilation), unexplained tachycardia, and muscle rigidity. Despite the name, elevation of body temperature is often a late sign, but may appear early in severe cases. Respiratory acidosis is universally present and many patients have developed metabolic acidosis at the time of diagnosis. A fast rate of breathing (in a spontaneously breathing patient), cyanosis, hypertension, abnormal heart rhythms, and high blood potassium may also be seen. Core body temperatures should be measured in any patient undergoing general anesthesia longer than 30 minutes.

Malignant hyperthermia is diagnosed on clinical grounds, but various laboratory investigations may prove confirmatory. These include a raised creatine kinase level, elevated potassium, increased phosphate (leading to decreased calcium) and—if determined—raised myoglobin; this is the result of damage to muscle cells. Severe rhabdomyolysis may lead to acute kidney failure, so kidney function is generally measured on a frequent basis. Patients may also experience premature ventricular contractions due to the increased levels of potassium released from the muscles during episodes.

=== Susceptibility testing ===
==== Muscle testing ====
The main candidates for testing are those with a close relative who has had an episode of MH or have been shown to be susceptible. The standard procedure is the "caffeine-halothane contracture test", CHCT. A muscle biopsy is carried out at an approved research center, under local anesthesia. The fresh biopsy is bathed in solutions containing caffeine or halothane and observed for contraction; under good conditions, the sensitivity is 97% and the specificity 78%. Negative biopsies are not definitive, so any patient who is suspected of MH by their medical history or that of blood relatives is generally treated with non-triggering anesthetics, even if the biopsy was negative. Some researchers advocate the use of the "calcium-induced calcium release" test in addition to the CHCT to make the test more specific.

Less invasive diagnostic techniques have been proposed. Intramuscular injection of halothane 6 vol% has been shown to result in higher than normal increases in local pCO_{2} among patients with known malignant hyperthermia susceptibility. The sensitivity was 100% and specificity was 75%. For patients at similar risk to those in this study, this leads to a positive predictive value of 80% and negative predictive value of 100%. This method may provide a suitable alternative to more invasive techniques. A 2002 study examined another possible metabolic test. In this test, intramuscular injection of caffeine was followed by local measurement of the pCO_{2}; those with known MH susceptibility had a significantly higher pCO_{2} (63 versus 44 mmHg). The authors propose larger studies to assess the test's suitability for determining MH risk.

==== Genetic testing ====
Genetic testing is being performed in a limited fashion to determine susceptibility to MH. In people with a family history of MH, analysis for RYR1 mutations may be useful.

=== Criteria ===
A 1994 consensus conference led to the formulation of a set of diagnostic criteria. The higher the score (above 6), the more likely a reaction constituted MH:

- Respiratory acidosis (end-tidal CO_{2} above 55 mmHg/7.32 kPa or arterial pCO_{2} above 60 mmHg/7.98 kPa)
- Heart involvement (unexplained sinus tachycardia, ventricular tachycardia or ventricular fibrillation)
- Metabolic acidosis (base excess lower than -8, pH <7.25)
- Muscle rigidity (generalized rigidity including severe masseter muscle rigidity)
- Muscle breakdown (CK >20,000/L units, cola colored urine or excess myoglobin in urine or serum, potassium above 6 mmol/L)
- Temperature increase (rapidly increasing temperature, T >38.8 °C)
- Other (rapid reversal of MH signs with dantrolene, elevated resting serum CK levels)
- Family history (autosomal dominant pattern)

== Prevention ==
In the past, the prophylactic use of dantrolene was recommended for MH-susceptible patients undergoing general anesthesia. However, multiple retrospective studies have demonstrated the safety of trigger-free general anesthesia in these patients in the absence of prophylactic dantrolene administration. The largest of these studies looked at the charts of 2214 patients who underwent general or regional anesthesia for an elective muscle biopsy. About half (1082) of the patients were muscle biopsy positive for MH. Only five of these patients exhibited signs consistent with MH, four of which were treated successfully with parenteral dantrolene, and the remaining one recovered with only symptomatic therapy. After weighing its questionable benefits against its possible adverse effects (including nausea, vomiting, muscle weakness and prolonged duration of action of nondepolarizing neuromuscular blocking agents), experts no longer recommend the use of prophylactic dantrolene prior to trigger-free general anesthesia in MH-susceptible patients.

=== Anesthesia machine preparation ===
Anesthesia for people with known susceptibility to MH requires avoidance of triggering agent concentrations above 5 parts per million (all volatile anesthetic agents and succinylcholine). Most other drugs are safe (including nitrous oxide), as are regional anesthetic techniques. Where general anesthesia is planned, it can be provided safely by either flushing the machine or using charcoal filters.

To flush the machine, first remove or disable the vaporizers and then flush the machine with 10 L/min or greater fresh gas flow rate for at least 20 minutes. While flushing the machine the ventilator should be set to periodically ventilate a new breathing circuit. The soda lime should also be replaced. After machine preparation, anesthesia should be induced and maintained with non-triggering agents. The time required to flush a machine varies for different machines and volatile anesthetics. This prevention technique was optimized to prepare older generation anesthesia machines. Modern anesthetic machines have more rubber and plastic components which provide a reservoir for volatile anesthetics, and should be flushed for 60 minutes.

Charcoal filters can be used to prepare an anesthesia machine in less than 60 seconds for people at risk of malignant hyperthermia. These filters prevent residual anesthetic from triggering malignant hyperthermia for up to 12 hours, even at low fresh gas flows. Prior to placing the charcoal filters, the machine should be flushed with fresh gas flows greater than 10 L/min for 90 seconds.

== Treatment ==
Dantrolene sodium, the only available medical treatment for malignant hyperthermia

The current treatment of choice is the intravenous administration of dantrolene, the only known antidote, discontinuation of triggering agents, and supportive therapy directed at correcting hyperthermia, acidosis, and organ dysfunction. Treatment must be instituted rapidly on clinical suspicion of the onset of malignant hyperthermia.

=== Dantrolene ===
Dantrolene is a muscle relaxant that appears to work directly on the ryanodine receptor to prevent the release of calcium. After the widespread introduction of treatment with dantrolene, the mortality of malignant hyperthermia fell from 80% in the 1960s to less than 5%. Dantrolene remains the only drug known to be effective in the treatment of MH. The recommended dose of dantrolene is 2.5 mg/kg, repeated as necessary. It is recommended that each hospital keeps a minimum stock of 36 dantrolene vials (720 mg), sufficient for four doses in a 70-kg person.

=== Training ===
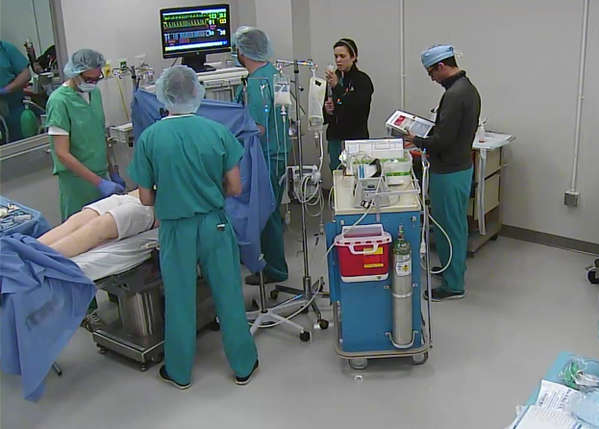
This is a mixed modality medical simulation of the treatment of malignant hyperthermia by anesthesia residents. The residents are managing care, mixing dantrolene and utilizing a cognitive aid at the bedside.

Fast recognition and treatment of MH utilizes skills and procedures that are utilized with a low-frequency and high-risk. Conducting MH crisis training for perioperative teams can identify system failures as well as improve response to these events. Simulation techniques to include the use of cognitive aids have also been shown to improve communication in clinical treatment of MH.

== Prognosis ==
Prognosis is poor if this condition is not aggressively treated. In the 1970s, mortality was greater than 80%; however, with the current management mortality is now less than 5%.

== Epidemiology ==
It occurs in between 1:5,000 and 1:100,000 in procedures involving general anaesthesia. This disorder occurs worldwide and affects all racial groups.

In the Manawatū region of New Zealand, up to 1 in 200 people are at high risk of the condition.

== History ==
The syndrome was first recognized in Royal Melbourne Hospital, Australia in an affected family by Denborough et al. in 1962. Denborough did much of his subsequent work on the condition at the Royal Canberra Hospital. Similar reactions were found in pigs. The efficacy of dantrolene as a treatment was discovered by South African anesthesiologist Gaisford Harrison and reported in a 1975 article published in the British Journal of Anaesthesia. After further animal studies corroborated the possible benefit from dantrolene, a 1982 study confirmed its usefulness in humans.

In 1981, the Malignant Hyperthermia Association of the United States (MHAUS) hotline was established to provide telephone support to clinical teams treating patients with suspected malignant hyperthermia. The hotline became active in 1982 and since that time MHAUS has provided continuous access to board-certified anesthesiologists to assist teams in treatment.

== Other animals ==
Other animals, including pigs. are susceptible to malignant hyperthermia.

In dogs its inheritance is autosomal dominant. The syndrome has been reported in Pointers, Greyhounds, Labrador Retrievers, Saint Bernards, Springer Spaniels, Bichon Frises, Golden Retrievers, and Border Collies.

In pigs its inheritance is autosomal recessive.

In horses its inheritance is autosomal dominant, and most associated with the American Quarter Horse although it can occur in other breeds.

== Research ==
Azumolene is a 30-fold more water-soluble analog of dantrolene that also works to decrease the release of intracellular calcium by its action on the ryanodine receptor. In MH-susceptible swine, azumolene was as potent as dantrolene. It has yet to be studied in vivo in humans, but may present a suitable alternative to dantrolene in the treatment of MH.
