= Porcine stress syndrome =

Condition in pigs

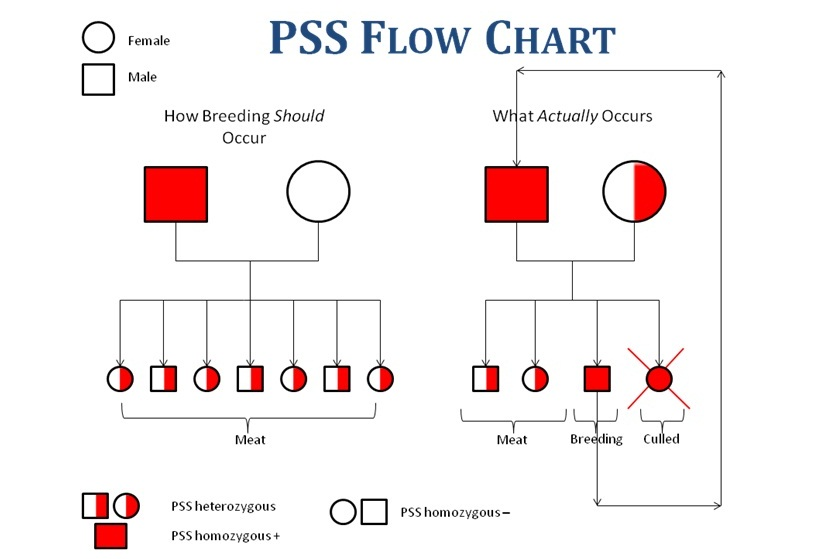
Common Industry Breeding Practice

Porcine stress syndrome, also known as malignant hyperthermia or PSS, is a condition in pigs. It is characterised by hyperthermia triggered by stress, anaesthesia with halothane or intense exercise. PSS may appear as sudden death in pigs, often after transport. It is an inherited, autosomal recessive disorder due to a defective ryanodine receptor leading to huge calcium influx, muscle contracture and increase in metabolism.

PSS can manifest itself in the abattoir as the production of pale, soft and exudative (PSE) meat due to a rapid fall in muscle pH and degradation of muscle proteins and structure. This meat is usually rejected after inspection.

It is most common in Landrace, Piétrain and cross-breeds of these breeds of pig. The genes may have been favoured in the past due to a larger muscle bulk in these breeds.

Psychologist Melanie Joy has likened PSS to post-traumatic stress disorder in humans.
