= Octatropine methylbromide =

Pharmaceutical drug

- Molecular structure of octatropine methylbromide

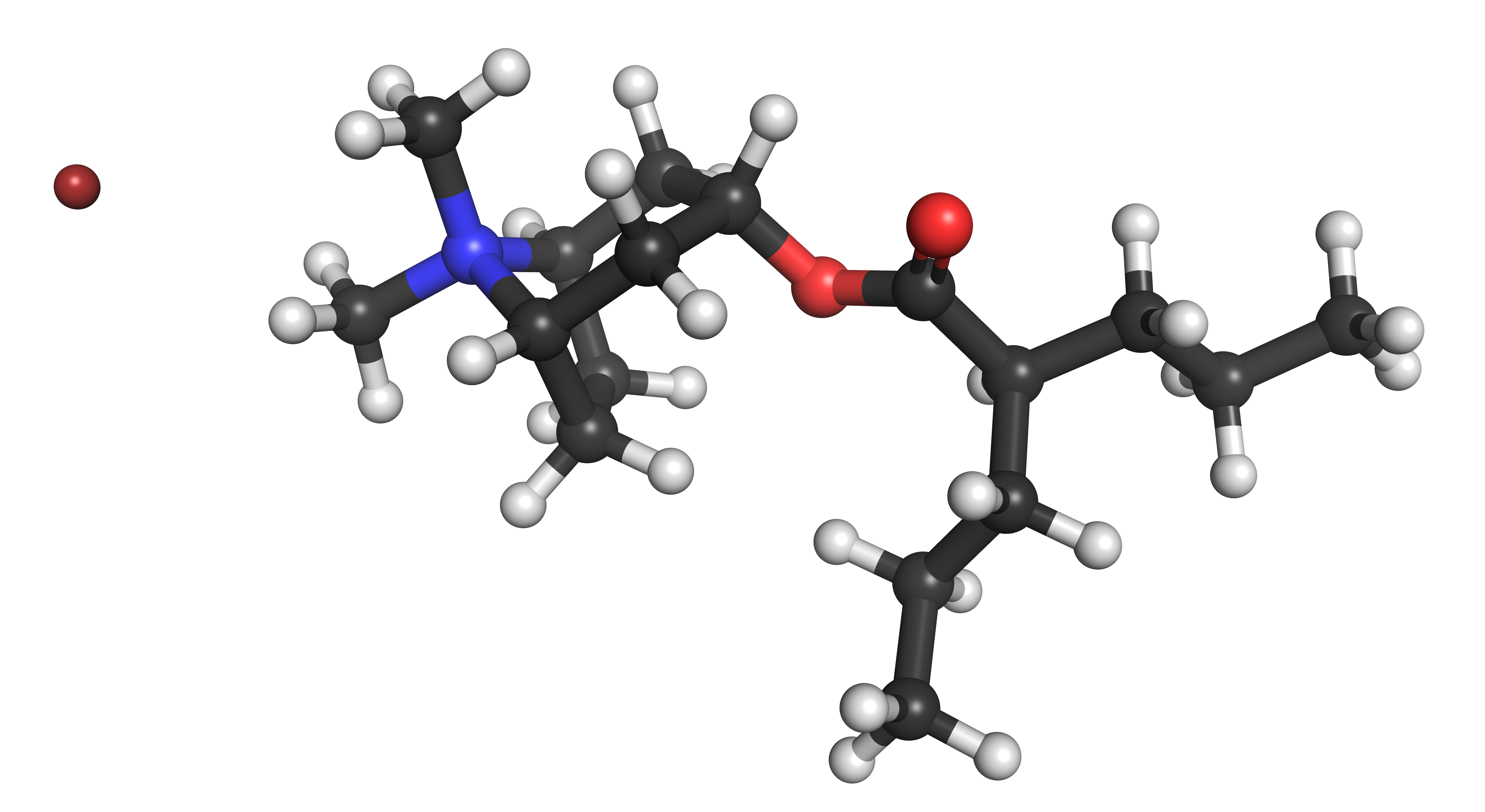
- 3D representation of an octatropine methylbromide molecule

Clinical data
- Other names: 8-Methyltropinium bromide 2- propylvalerate
- Routes of administration: Oral
- ATC code: none

Pharmacokinetic data
- Bioavailability: 10 to 25% (oral)
- Protein binding: Unknown
- Metabolism: Hepatic
- Elimination half-life: Unknown

Identifiers
- IUPAC name: (endo)-8,8-dimethyl-8-azoniabicyclo[3.2.1]octan-3-yl] 2-propylpentanoate bromide
- CAS Number: 80-50-2
- PubChem CID: 6647
- DrugBank: DB00517
- ChemSpider: 10482228
- UNII: 62M960DHIL
- KEGG: D00232
- ChEMBL: ChEMBL1186610
- CompTox Dashboard (EPA): DTXSID8022612
- ECHA InfoCard: 100.001.169

Chemical and physical data
- Formula: C_{17}H_{32}BrNO_{2}
- Molar mass: 362.352 g·mol^{−1}
- 3D model (JSmol): Interactive image
- SMILES: CCCC(CCC)C(=O)O[C@H]1C[C@H]2CC[C@@H](C1)[N+]2(C)C.[Br-]
- InChI: InChI=1S/C17H32NO2.BrH/c1-5-7-13(8-6-2)17(19)20-16-11-14-9-10-15(12-16)18(14,3)4;/h13-16H,5-12H2,1-4H3;1H/q+1;/p-1/t14-,15+,16+; Key:QSFKGMJOKUZAJM-CNKDKAJDSA-M

Octatropine methylbromide (INN) or anisotropine methylbromide (USAN), trade names Valpin, Endovalpin, Lytispasm and others, is a muscarinic antagonist and antispasmodic. It was introduced to the U.S. market in 1963 as an adjunct in the treatment of peptic ulcer, and promoted as being more specific to the gastrointestinal tract than other anticholinergics, although its selectivity was questioned in later studies.

Octatropine has been superseded by more effective agents in the treatment of peptic ulcer disease, and is no longer used. It is still sold in some countries in combination with other drugs, such as phenobarbital and metamizole.
