= Neuroleptic malignant syndrome =

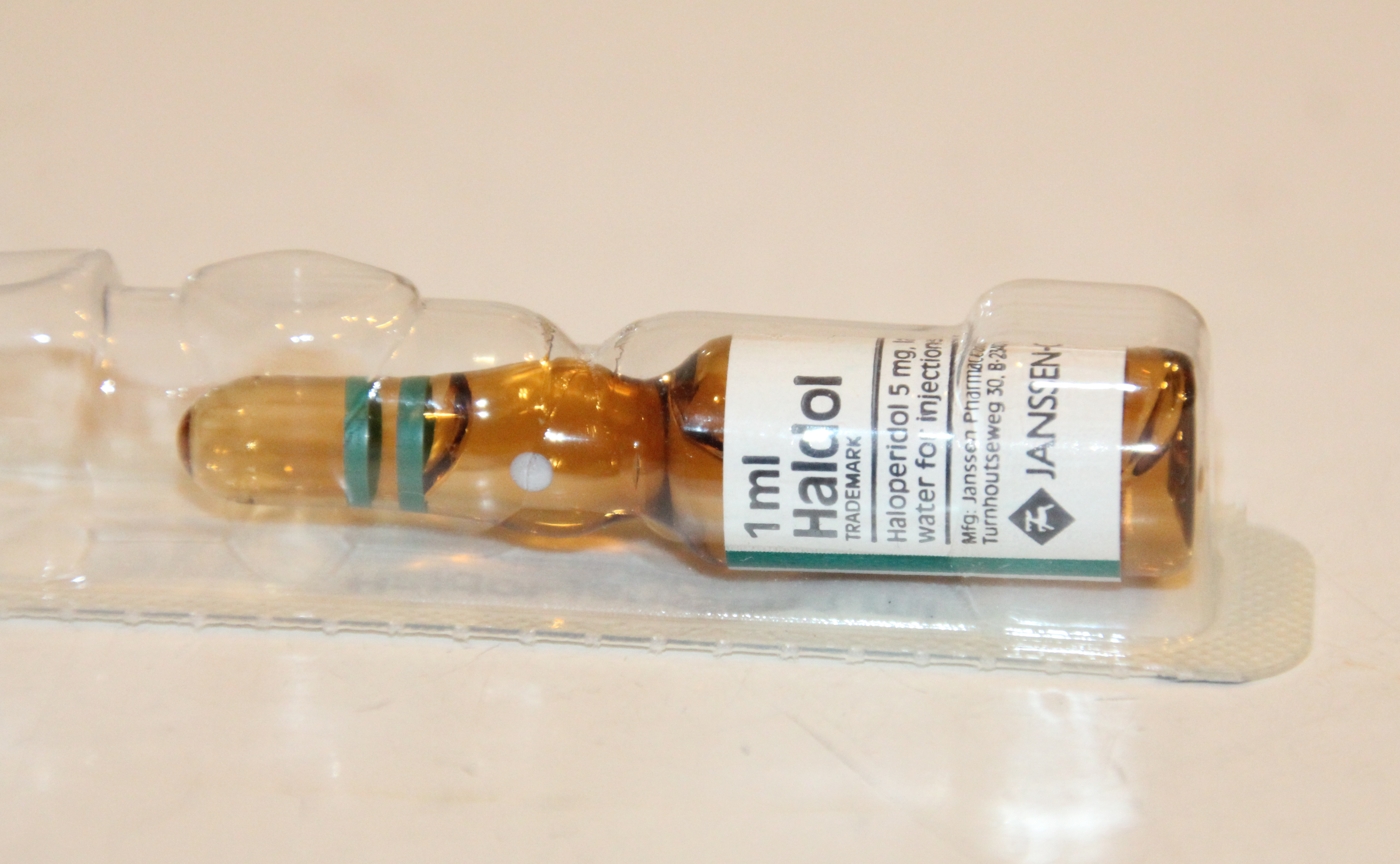
- Haloperidol, a known cause of NMS
- Specialty: Critical care medicine, neurology, psychiatry, emergency medicine
- Symptoms: High fever, confusion, rigid muscles, variable blood pressure, sweating
- Complications: Rhabdomyolysis, high blood potassium, kidney failure, seizures
- Usual onset: Within a few weeks or days
- Causes: Antipsychotic medication
- Risk factors: Dehydration, agitation, catatonia
- Diagnostic method: Based on symptoms in someone who has started on antipsychotics within the last month
- Differential diagnosis: Heat stroke, malignant hyperthermia, serotonin syndrome, lethal catatonia
- Treatment: Stopping the offending medication, rapid cooling, starting other medications
- Medication: Dantrolene, bromocriptine, diazepam
- Prognosis: 10–15% risk of death
- Frequency: 15 per 100,000 per year (on neuroleptics)

Neuroleptic malignant syndrome (NMS) is a rare but life-threatening reaction that can occur in response to ingesting antipsychotics (neuroleptics) or other drugs that block the effects of dopamine. Symptoms include high fever, confusion, rigid muscles, variable blood-pressure, sweating, and fast heart-rate. Complications may include muscle breakdown (rhabdomyolysis), high blood potassium, kidney failure, or seizures.

Any medications within the family of antipsychotics can cause the condition, though typical antipsychotics appear to entail a higher risk than atypicals, specifically first-generation antipsychotics like haloperidol. Onset is often within a few weeks of starting the medication but can occur at any time. Risk factors include dehydration, agitation, and catatonia.

Rapidly decreasing the use of levodopa or other dopamine agonists, such as pramipexole, may also trigger the condition. The underlying mechanism involves blockage of dopamine receptors. Diagnosis is based on symptoms.

Management includes stopping the triggering medication, rapid cooling, and starting other medications. Medications used include dantrolene, bromocriptine, and diazepam. The risk of death among those affected is about 10%. Rapid diagnosis and treatment is required to improve outcomes. Many people can eventually be restarted on a lower dose of antipsychotic.

As of 2011, about 15 per 100,000 (0.015%) patients in psychiatric hospitals on antipsychotics are affected per year. In the second half of the 20th century rates were over 100 times higher at about 2% (2,000 per 100,000). Males appear to be more often affected than females. The condition was first described in 1956.

== Signs and symptoms ==
NMS symptoms include:

- Increased body temperature >38 °C (>100.4 °F)
- Confused or altered consciousness
- Excessive sweating
- Severely rigid muscles
- Autonomic imbalance

The first symptoms of neuroleptic malignant syndrome are usually muscle cramps and tremors, fever, symptoms of autonomic nervous system instability such as unstable blood pressure, and sudden changes in mental status (agitation, delirium, or coma). Other possible symptoms include sweating, trouble swallowing, incontinence, and mutism. Once symptoms appear, they may progress rapidly and reach peak intensity in as little as three days. These symptoms can last anywhere from eight hours to forty days, with the median duration of symptoms, with treatment, being nine days. The median onset of symptoms is four days after initiating the offending medication, but in some cases symptoms may begin up to 30 days later.

Symptoms are sometimes misinterpreted by doctors as symptoms of mental illness which can result in delayed treatment. Symptoms may also be mistaken for similarly presenting conditions such as malignant hyperthermia, serotonin syndrome, and substance intoxication from illicit drugs such as cocaine, methamphetamine, or MDMA.

Neuroleptic malignant syndrome (NMS) usually presents with a "lead pipe rigidity" in which the muscles are stiffened and resistance is observed throughout the range of motion on testing. Severe cases may present as catatonia in which the person is not responsive to stimuli.

The deep tendon reflexes in NMS are usually preserved whereas serotonin syndrome presents with myoclonus or hyperactive muscle reflexes.

== Causes ==
NMS is usually caused by antipsychotic drug use, but other dopaminergic blocking drugs can also be a cause. Individuals using butyrophenones (such as haloperidol and droperidol) or phenothiazines (such as promethazine and chlorpromazine) are reported to be at greatest risk. However, various atypical antipsychotics such as clozapine, olanzapine, risperidone, quetiapine, and ziprasidone have also been implicated in cases.

NMS may also occur in people taking dopaminergic drugs (such as levodopa) for Parkinson's disease, most often when the drug dosage is abruptly reduced. In addition, other drugs with anti-dopaminergic activity, such as the antiemetic metoclopramide, can induce NMS. Tetracyclics with anti-dopaminergic activity have been linked to NMS in case reports, such as the amoxapines. Additionally, desipramine, dothiepin, phenelzine, tetrabenazine, and reserpine have been known to trigger NMS. Whether lithium can cause NMS is unclear. However, concomitant use of lithium is associated with a higher risk of NMS when a person starts on an antipsychotic drug.

At the molecular level, NMS is caused by a sudden, marked reduction in dopamine activity, either from withdrawal of dopaminergic agents or blockade of dopamine receptors.

=== Risk factors ===
The use of antipsychotics as well as how this class of medications is used is one of the most common risk factors for NMS. Use of high-potency antipsychotics, a rapid increase in the dosage of antipsychotics, use of long-acting forms of antipsychotics (such as haloperidol) or injectable formulations, or using multiple antipsychotics are all known to increase the risk of developing NMS. Dehydration is a risk factor for the development of NMS. There appears to be no relationship between duration of therapy and the development of NMS.

Use of the following agents is most commonly associated with the development of NMS:

- Typical antipsychotics: e.g. haloperidol, chlorpromazine.
- Anti-dopaminergic antiemetics: e.g. droperidol
- Withdrawal of dopaminergic agents: e.g. levodopa, amantadine

It has been purported that there is a genetic risk factor for NMS. In one study, identical twins presented with NMS, and a mother and two of her daughters have presented with NMS in another case.

Demographically, it appears that males, especially those under forty, are at greatest risk for developing NMS, although it is unclear if the increased incidence is a result of greater antipsychotic use in men under forty. It has also been suggested that postpartum women may be at a greater risk for NMS.

Antipsychotic use in those with Lewy body dementia is a risk factor for NMS. These people are extremely sensitive to antipsychotics. As a result, antipsychotics should be used cautiously in all cases of dementia.

== Pathophysiology ==
The mechanism is commonly thought to depend on decreased levels of dopamine activity due to:

- Dopamine receptor blockade
- Genetically reduced function of dopamine receptor D_{2}
- Sympathoadrenal hyperactivity and autonomic dysfunction

It has been proposed that blockade of D_{2}-like (D_{2}, D_{3} and D_{4}) receptors induce massive glutamate release, generating catatonia, neurotoxicity and myotoxicity. Additionally, the blockade of diverse serotonin receptors by atypical antipsychotics and activation of 5-HT_{1} receptors by some may reduce GABA release and indirectly induce glutamate release, worsening this proposed glutamatergic neurotoxicity.

The muscular symptoms are most likely caused by blockade of the dopamine receptor D_{2}, leading to abnormal function of the basal ganglia similar to that seen in Parkinson's disease.

In the past, research and clinical studies seemed to corroborate the D_{2} receptor blockade theory in which antipsychotic drugs were thought to significantly reduce dopamine activity by blocking the D_{2} receptors associated with this neurotransmitter. The introduction of atypical antipsychotic drugs, with lower affinity to the D_{2} dopamine receptors, was thought to have reduced the incidence of NMS. However, recent studies suggest that the decrease in mortality may be the result of increased physician awareness and earlier initiation of treatment rather than the action of the drugs themselves. NMS induced by atypical drugs also resembles "classical" NMS (induced by "typical" antipsychotic drugs), further casting doubt on the overall superiority of these drugs.

However, the failure of D_{2} dopamine receptor antagonism, or dopamine receptor dysfunction, do not fully explain the presenting symptoms and signs of NMS, as well as the occurrence of NMS with atypical antipsychotic drugs with lower D_{2} dopamine activity. This has led to the hypothesis of sympathoadrenal hyperactivity (results from removing tonic inhibition from the sympathetic nervous system) as a mechanism for NMS. Release of calcium is increased from the sarcoplasmic reticulum with antipsychotic usage. This can result in increased muscle contractility, which can play a role in the breakdown of muscle, muscle rigidity, and hyperthermia. Some antipsychotic drugs, such as typical antipsychotics, are known to block dopamine receptors; other studies have shown that when drugs supplying dopamine are withdrawn, symptoms similar to NMS present themselves.

In support of the sympathoadrenal hyperactivity model, it has been hypothesized that a defect in calcium regulatory proteins within the sympathetic neurons may bring about the onset of NMS. This model of NMS strengthens its suspected association with malignant hyperthermia in which NMS may be regarded as a neurogenic form of this condition which itself is linked to defective calcium-related proteins.

There is also thought to be considerable overlap between malignant catatonia and NMS in their pathophysiology, the former being idiopathic and the latter being the drug-induced form of the same syndrome.

The raised white blood cell count and creatine phosphokinase (CPK) plasma concentration seen in those with NMS is due to increased muscular activity and rhabdomyolysis (destruction of muscle tissue). Someone may experience hypertensive crisis and metabolic acidosis.

The fever seen with NMS is believed to be caused by hypothalamic dopamine receptor blockade. Antipsychotics cause an increased calcium release from the sarcoplasmic reticulum of muscle cells which can result in rigidity and eventual cell breakdown. No major studies have reported an explanation for the abnormal EEG, but it is likely also attributable to dopamine blockage leading to changes in neuronal pathways.

== Diagnosis ==
=== Differential diagnosis ===
Due to the comparative rarity of NMS, it is often overlooked. Immediate treatment for the syndrome should not be delayed as it has a high mortality of between 10-20%. Differentiating NMS from other neurological disorders can be very difficult.

The diagnosis is suggested on patients with a history of drug exposure to the most common inducing agents such as strong antidopaminergic medications. The differential diagnosis includes serotonin syndrome, encephalitis, toxic encephalopathy, status epilepticus, heat stroke, catatonia and malignant hyperthermia. Substance intoxication from stimulant drugs, such as cocaine, amphetamine, or methamphetamine may also produce similar symptoms. Features which distinguish NMS from serotonin syndrome include bradykinesia, muscle rigidity, and a high white blood cell count.

== Treatment ==
NMS is a medical emergency and can lead to death if untreated. The first step is to stop the culprit medication and treat the hyperthermia aggressively, such as with cooling blankets or ice packs to the axillae and groin. Acetaminophen is commonly used as an anti-pyretic. Supportive care in an intensive care unit capable of circulatory and ventilatory support is crucial. In those unable to control their secretions, or who have muscle spams of the respiratory muscles, mechanical ventilation may be needed.

The best pharmacological treatment is still unclear. Dantrolene has been used when needed to reduce muscle rigidity, and dopamine pathway medications such as bromocriptine have shown benefit. Dantrolene may act centrally on thermoregulatory pathways to lower the temperature. Dantrolene also inhibits calcium release from the muscle sarcoplasmic reticulum to cause muscle relaxation. Amantadine is another treatment option due to its dopaminergic and anticholinergic effects. Apomorphine may be used however its use is supported by little evidence. Benzodiazepines may be used to control agitation. Highly elevated blood myoglobin levels from muscle breakdown (rhabdomyolysis) can result in kidney damage, therefore aggressive intravenous hydration with diuresis may be required. When recognized early NMS can be successfully managed; however, up to 10% of cases can be fatal.

Should the affected person subsequently require an antipsychotic, trialing a low dose of a low-potency atypical antipsychotic is recommended.

Electroconvulsive therapy may be used in life threatening cases of NMS that are refractory to first line treatments.

== Prognosis ==
The prognosis is best when identified early and treated aggressively. In earlier studies the mortality rates of NMS ranged from 20%–38%, but by 2009 mortality rates were reported to have fallen below 10% over the previous two decades due to early recognition and improvements in management. Re-introduction of antipsychotics after NMS may trigger a recurrence, although in most cases it does not. With recurrence rate being 4.2% in a small, population based study.

== Epidemiology ==
Pooled data suggest the incidence of NMS is between 0.2%–3.23%. However, greater awareness coupled with increased use of atypical anti-psychotics have likely reduced the prevalence of NMS. Additionally, young males are particularly susceptible and the male to female ratio has been reported to be as high as 2:1.

== History ==
NMS was known about as early as 1956, shortly after the introduction of the first phenothiazines. NMS was first described in 1960 by French clinicians who had been working on a study involving haloperidol. They characterized the condition that was associated with the side effects of haloperidol "syndrome malin des neuroleptiques", which was translated to neuroleptic malignant syndrome.
