= PSE meat =

Carcass quality condition

Pale, soft, exudative meat, or PSE meat, describes a carcass quality condition known to occur in pork, beef, and poultry. It is characterized by an abnormal color, consistency, and water holding capacity, making the meat dry and unattractive to consumers. The condition is believed to be caused by abnormal muscle metabolism following slaughter, due to an altered rate of glycolysis and a low pH within the muscle fibers. A mutation point in the ryanodine receptor gene (RYR1) in pork, associated to stress levels prior to slaughter are known to increase the incidence of PSE meat. Although the term "soft" may look positive, it refers to raw meat. When cooked, there is higher cook loss and the final product is hard, not juicy.

The malignant hyperthermia (MH) or porcine stress syndrome (PSS) are the terms used to refer to the state pigs are found before slaughter, which will result in PSE.

The other related defect is the dark, firm, dry (DFD) condition, or dark-cutter meat; it is also related to muscle glycogen metabolism and is the opposite result of PSE, i.e., it occurs if the post-mortem muscle pH is high.

== Description ==
Normally, calcium ions are used by the body to activate muscle cells, composed of myofibril. Ca2+ is transported out of the sarcoplasmic reticulum by ryanodine channels to the cytoplasm of muscle fibers/cells (called sarcoplasm), the process responsible for contractions of the myofibers. Under PSE conditions, twice the amount of Ca2+ can be released post-mortem, which causes excessive glycolysis and the buildup of lactic acid since the metabolism post-mortem is anaerobic. This lactate accumulates in the postmortem muscle, and leads to a very low pH.

As the pH drops, proteins in the myofibers are denatured, leading to abnormal cell structure. The result is a pale tissue color, and a soft, almost mushy texture. The sarcomeres collapse excessively, and less water is held within the cell membrane and proteins. Subsequently, the myofibers will continue to lose water content as the meat is cooled and stored, leading to excessive drip loss.

Pigs susceptible to porcine stress syndrome, or PSS, have an increased likelihood of developing PSE meat. These animals become easily stressed pre-slaughter, which leads to exaggerated glycolysis, an increase in body temperature, and higher production of lactic acid. In particular, the Halothane gene, HAL, induces PSS in swine. It is a single point mutation in this gene that causes abnormal calcium channels within the muscle. HAL+ pigs are five times more likely to develop PSE meat than HAL- hogs.

The incidence of PSE in poultry meat is believed to have increased over the past several decades because of the incredible advancements in growth rates. Intense breeding selection for breast size and feed efficiency is likely responsible for the increase in meat quality issues. Conditions behind the PSE poultry meat are believed to be the same as observed in pork; higher rates of glycolysis postmortem lead to a sudden pH drop, which in turn causes protein denaturation and a loss of functionality, important factor to create meaty products, such as sausages. Although the same ryanodine mutation found in pork was not found in poultry, differences in α-ryanodine and β-ryanodine were found. Avian species have lower quantities of the β isoform. This isoform of the channel is more reactive to Ca2+ accumulation, and once activated, remains opened for a longer period in which it is irresponsive, therefore, relatively higher number of α-channels pumps higher calcium ions to the sarcoplasm at a higher speed, contributing to pH lowering. For this similarity, PSE in other species than pork can be referred to as "PSE-like".

== Predisposing factors ==
=== Stress ===
Acute stress immediately prior to slaughter may result in the abnormal Ca2+ diffusion seen in PSE postmortem muscle. This in turn will induce the increase in glycolysis and cause the decline in pH. Stressful conditions may include handling, transportation, loading and unloading from a truck, mixing with unfamiliar animals and individuals, entering an unfamiliar facility, and stunning.

It has also been suggested that excessive heat during summer months results in higher rates of poultry meat quality problems. Transport is one of the most critical moments before slaughter, taking up most of the time of the process, and the incidence of PSE is related to the position of birds in the truck and the design of the lorry/truck.

For these reasons, animal welfare often correlates to the incidence of PSE meat or other carcass quality issues. The length of transport, time period between loading and unloading, and the rest time in lairage are known to affect meat quality. Physical activity and psychological stress associated with transportation, as well as incidence of fighting between individuals in lairage, can confound these factors.

Hogs susceptible to porcine stress syndrome (PSS) commonly develop PSE meat postmortem.

=== Genetics ===
In the swine industry, the RYR1 gene, which encodes the ryanodine receptor protein, RyR1, was found to influence the incidence of PSE meat conditions. Upon discovery, this gene was named the Halothane gene, Hal, because researchers noticed that pigs with this specific genotype developed PSE meat after being anesthetized with the halothane drug. The RyR1 protein is the channel responsible for controlling the Ca2+ release from the sarcoplasmic reticulum in skeletal muscle. A mutation found in this gene is likely responsible for the majority of PSE pork problems. However, the Hal gene is only responsible for about 25-35% of the PSE meat processed at abattoirs. Another gene, PRKAG3, commonly also known as the Rendement Napole (RN) gene, affects pork quality in a similar way but through a different mechanism. The RN- dominant allele increases the glycogen content of the muscle, resulting in lower ultimate pH, a phenomen known as 'acid meat' or the 'Hampshire effect'.

The poultry industry is still currently trying to identify and eliminate genes that may be responsible for predisposing birds to PSE meat.

== Potential solutions ==
=== Genetic selection ===
Advancements in swine and poultry breeding can result in decreases in PSE meat. Selecting hogs with a genotype lacking the Hal and RN- genes should help eliminate the problem. Breeding advancements have led to fewer marketed pigs having genotypes containing these two genes, so that PSE rates are decreasing. Using microbiology techniques, it is also possible to "knockout" these genes to reduce the likelihood of carcass quality problems. In addition, breeding animals not susceptible to porcine stress syndrome is highly beneficial. Poultry breeding companies can lower meat qualities issues, including PSE, by selecting for traits in addition to yield and efficiency, such as health and cardiovascular wellness in order to increase tolerance to stress.

=== Welfare ===
Since stress is highly correlated to carcass quality, reducing causes of stress during the slaughter process can drastically improve meat quality. In addition, calmer animals will have a lower body temperature, which can help eliminate protein denaturation if no lairage time is allowed. In birds, improving environmental quality will help to eliminate wing flapping, vocalizations, and excessive movement as animals are transported from the farm into the abattoir, which can reduce PSE incidence. Lower meat pH's are correlated with the length and roughness of transportation. Stress levels are also known to decline as human handling decreases.

As solutions, automatic loaders and unloaders may be useful for the poultry industry (although this topic is under debate due to high level of noise from those machines). Personnel training for humane catching by closing the wings, instead of grabbing birds by legs, is under review. It is thought that reduction of bruises, pain and fear (of humans or machinery) can have a positive effect on meat quality and welfare. Following transportation and unloading, animals should be given an extensive rest period before stunning (referred to as lairage) to allow animals to recover homeostasis, especially regarding lactic acid removal from tissues and glycogen reserves reestablishment. Stunning methods can play a large role in meat quality. Current research suggests that a two phase gas chamber may be best for minimizing stress. During summer time or in hot countries, the truck design should be taken into consideration, and passive ventilation and water shower before leaving the farm can have a positive effect and reduce the occurrence of PSE by up to 66.3%, which can be done by costless modifications.

=== Abattoir chilling conditions ===
Quickly chilling pork and poultry meat, in order to bring the muscle temperature down to an acceptable level, will reduce myofibril glycolysis and stop muscle metabolism. Slower chilling results in a lower pH, lighter colored meat, and greater yield losses after cooking.

The DFD meat, however, occurs if the chilling is too fast, as it reduces glycolysis to the opposite extreme. Its frequency is increased due to extremely stressful conditions during transport, resulting in glycogen depletion, and insufficient rest in lairage that would help build up reserves, i.e., DFD it is the result of a series of poor decisions in slaughterhouse management in regards to excessive number of animals transported, abattoir lines free and unused capacity, or lack of communication between the slaughterhouse and farmers (accidents, road blocks, mistiming) in order to prevent issues.

This relationship between PSE and DFD illustrates the importance of good pre-slaughter practices and careful tailoring of the chilling timing.

== Economics ==
Meat quality issues cost the pork industry $200 million annually in the US. Of this total, the incidence of PSE meat accounts for a decline in profits by approximately $0.90 per pig.

In 2005, the incidence of PSE meat on the market in the United States was found to be 3.4%, significantly less than during a similar survey three years earlier. However, the range of PSE incidence ranges from 0.1% to 10% throughout the industry.

== See also ==
- Dark, Firm, Dry (DFD)/Darkcutter meat
