= Tizanidine =

Muscle relaxant medication

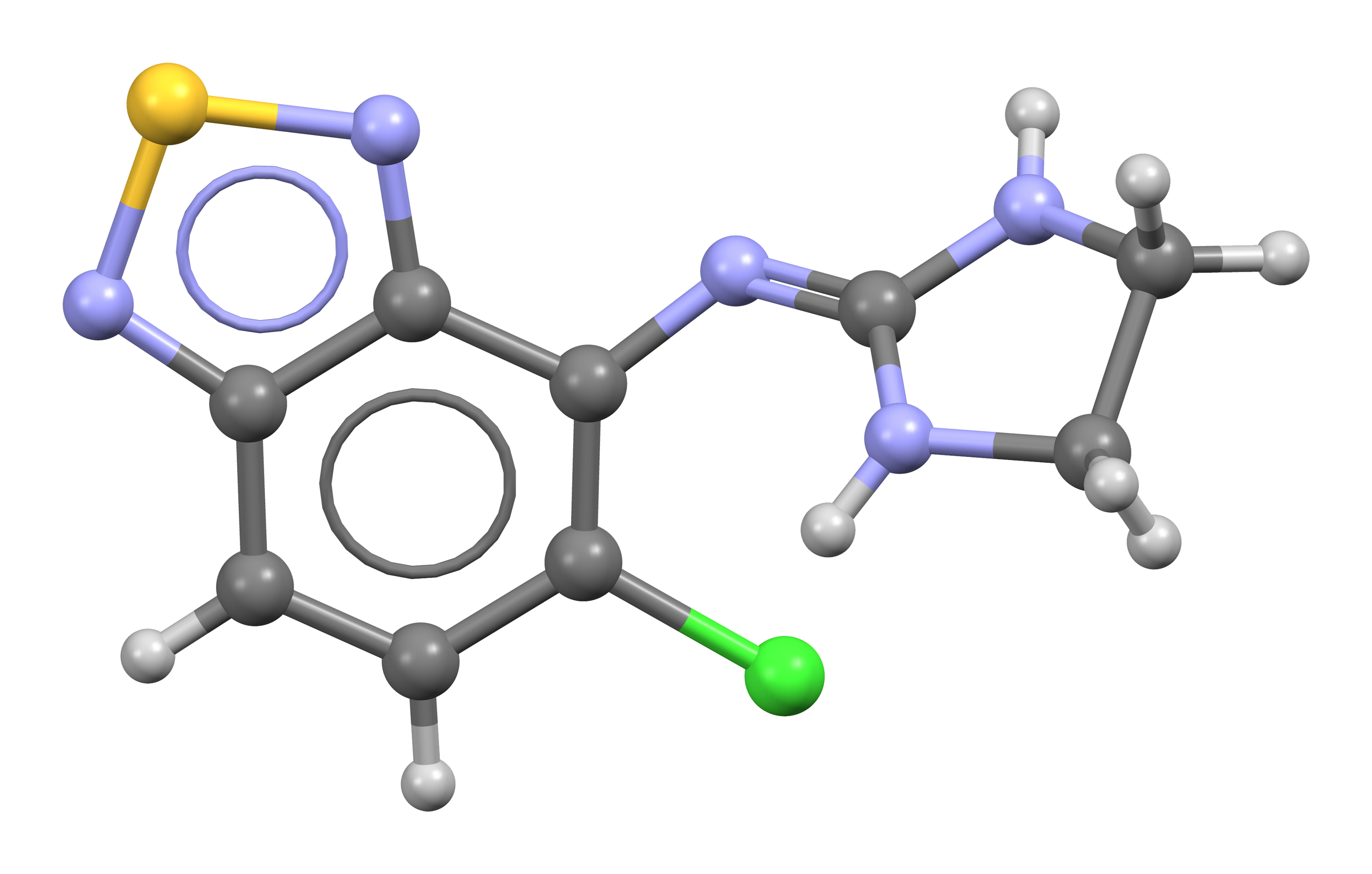

Clinical data
- Pronunciation: /taɪˈzænɪdiːn/ tye-ZAN-i-deen
- Trade names: Zanaflex, Sirdalud, and others
- Other names: AN-021; DS 103-282
- AHFS/Drugs.com: Monograph
- MedlinePlus: a601121
- License data: US DailyMed: Tizanidine
- Routes of administration: Oral (tablets, capsules)
- Drug class: α_{2}-Adrenergic receptor agonist; Muscle relaxant; Sedative; Hypnotic
- ATC code: M03BX02 (WHO)

Legal status
- Legal status: US: ℞-only

Pharmacokinetic data
- Bioavailability: ~40%
- Protein binding: ~30%
- Metabolism: Extensive (>95%), primarily via CYP1A2
- Elimination half-life: Tizanidine: 2.5 hours Inactive metabolites: 20–40 hours
- Excretion: Urine (60%), feces (20%)

Identifiers
- IUPAC name: 5-chloro-N-(4,5-dihydro-1H-imidazol-2-yl)benzo[c][1,2,5]thiadiazol-4-amine
- CAS Number: 51322-75-9
- PubChem CID: 5487
- IUPHAR/BPS: 7308
- DrugBank: DB00697
- ChemSpider: 5287
- UNII: 6AI06C00GW
- KEGG: D08611; as HCl: D00776
- ChEBI: CHEBI:63629
- ChEMBL: ChEMBL1079
- CompTox Dashboard (EPA): DTXSID9023679
- ECHA InfoCard: 100.125.400

Chemical and physical data
- Formula: C_{9}H_{8}ClN_{5}S
- Molar mass: 253.71 g·mol^{−1}
- 3D model (JSmol): Interactive image
- SMILES: Clc1ccc3nsnc3c1NC/2=N/CCN\2
- InChI: InChI=1S/C9H8ClN5S/c10-5-1-2-6-8(15-16-14-6)7(5)13-9-11-3-4-12-9/h1-2H,3-4H2,(H2,11,12,13); Key:XFYDIVBRZNQMJC-UHFFFAOYSA-N

Tizanidine, sold under the brand names Zanaflex and Sirdalud among others, is an α_{2}-adrenergic receptor agonist and muscle relaxant which is used to treat muscle spasticity due to spinal cord injury, multiple sclerosis, and spastic cerebral palsy. Its effectiveness appears to be similar to that of other muscle relaxants like baclofen or diazepam. The drug is taken orally.

Common side effects of tizanidine include sleepiness, dry mouth, asthenia, dizziness, low blood pressure, and low heart rate. Serious side effects may include dangerously low blood pressure, liver problems, and psychosis. It is unclear if use in pregnancy and breastfeeding is safe. The drug is an α_{2}-adrenergic receptor agonist, but how it works is not entirely clear.

Tizanidine was approved for medical use in the United States in 1996. It is available as a generic medication. In 2023, it was the 88th most commonly prescribed medication in the United States, with more than 8 million prescriptions.

== Medical uses ==
=== Muscle spasticity ===
Tizanidine is approved and used as a muscle relaxant to treat muscle spasticity. It has been found to be as effective as other muscle relaxants and is more tolerable than baclofen and diazepam. Due to its short elimination half-life and duration, tizanidine is generally taken once every 6 to 8 hours as needed, with a maximum of 3 doses per 24 hours.

=== Other uses ===
Tizanidine may be used off-label in the treatment of insomnia and for certain other uses.

=== Available forms ===
Tizanidine is available in the form of oral tablets and capsules.

== Contraindications ==
Contraindications of tizanidine include concomitant use with strong CYP1A2 inhibitors and known hypersensitivity to tizanidine or its excipients. Tizanidine is contraindicated with strong CYP1A2 inhibitors as these drugs profoundly increase tizanidine levels. Warnings and precautions for tizanidine include hypotension, liver injury, sedation, and hallucinations and psychotic-like symptoms.

== Side effects ==
The most common side effects of tizanidine (>10%) include somnolence, dry mouth, asthenia (including weakness, fatigue, and/or tiredness), dizziness, hypotension, and bradycardia. At doses of 8 to 16 mg, the rates of these side effects were 78–92% for somnolence, 76–88% for dry mouth, 67–78% for asthenia, 22–45% for dizziness, 16–33% for hypotension, and 2–10% for bradycardia. Additional side effects of tizanidine may include drowsiness, nervousness, confusion, hallucinations, strange dreams, depression, vomiting, constipation, diarrhea, stomach pain, heartburn, increased muscle spasms, back pain, rash, sweating, and tingling sensations in the arms, legs, hands, and feet.

Tizanidine can cause withdrawal symptoms upon abrupt discontinuation and should be gradually tapered to avoid and minimize such symptoms. Withdrawal symptoms include rebound hypertension, tachycardia, hypertonia, tremor, and anxiety.

== Overdose ==
Symptoms of overdose with tizanidine have been reported to include lethargy, somnolence, bradycardia, hypotension, respiratory depression, agitation, confusion, vomiting, and coma.

== Interactions ==
Concomitant use of tizanidine and moderate or potent CYP1A2 inhibitors (such as zileuton, certain antiarrhythmics (amiodarone, mexiletine, propafenone, verapamil), cimetidine, famotidine, aciclovir, ticlopidine and oral contraceptives) is contraindicated. Concomitant use of tizanidine with fluvoxamine, a potent CYP1A2 inhibitor in humans, resulted in a 33-fold increase in the tizanidine AUC (plasma drug concentration-time curve). For this reason fluvoxamine and tizanidine should not be taken at the same time. Fluoroquinolone antibiotics such as moxifloxacin, levofloxacin, and ciprofloxacin should also be avoided due to an increased serum concentration of tizanidine when administered concomitantly.

Tizanidine has the potential to interact with other central nervous system depressants. Alcohol should be avoided, particularly as it can upset the stomach. The CNS-depressant effects of tizanidine and alcohol are additive.

Caution with the following interactions:

- Antibiotics such as enoxacin, gatifloxacin, levofloxacin, lomefloxacin, moxifloxacin, ofloxacin, sparfloxacin, trovafloxacin, or norfloxacin;
- Blood pressure medications such as clonidine, guanabenz, guanfacine (Tenex), or methyldopa;
- Heart rhythm medications such as amiodarone (Cordarone, Pacerone), mexiletine (Mexitil), propafenone (Rhythmol), and verapamil (Calan, Covera, Isoptin).

== Pharmacology ==
=== Pharmacodynamics ===
Site	K_{i} (nM)	Species	Ref
α_{2A}	62	Human	
α_{2B}	75	OK	
α_{2C}	76	Rat	

Tizanidine is an α_{2}-adrenergic receptor agonist and is closely related to clonidine. It has approximately one-tenth to one-fifteenth of the blood pressure-lowering effect or potency of clonidine. The relation between the α_{2}-adrenergic receptor agonism and spasmolytic action of tizanidine is still not fully understood.

=== Pharmacokinetics ===
==== Absorption ====
Tizanidine is essentially completely absorbed with oral administration. The oral bioavailability of tizanidine is approximately 40%. It is subject to extensive first-pass metabolism and this is responsible for its incomplete bioavailability. The pharmacokinetics of tizanidine are linear across a dose range of 1 to 20 mg. The time to peak levels with tizanidine under fasting conditions is 1 hour and under fed conditions is 1.5 to 3 hours. The pharmacokinetics of tizanidine with oral tablet and capsule formulations are the same under fasting conditions but diverge and are non-equivalent under fed conditions. The pharmacokinetics of tizanidine also change when capsules are opened and it is sprinkled onto applesauce versus intact capsules.

==== Distribution ====
Tizanidine is extensively distributed throughout the body. Its volume of distribution is 2.4 L/kg following intravenous injection. The drug's plasma protein binding is approximately 30%.

==== Metabolism ====
More than 95% of a dose of tizanidine is metabolized. The primary cytochrome P450 enzyme involved in the metabolism of tizanidine is CYP1A2. Strong CYP3A4 inhibitors such as fluvoxamine and ciprofloxacin can increase tizanidine exposure by 10- to 33-fold, indicating the key involvement of CYP1A2 in the metabolism of the drug. The metabolites of tizanidine are thought to be inactive.

==== Elimination ====
Tizanidine is eliminated 60% in urine and 20% in feces. Its elimination half-life is approximately 2.5 hours. The inactive metabolites of tizanidine have half-lives of 20 to 40 hours.

== Chemistry ==
=== Synthesis ===
Tizanidine is a derivative of 2,1,3-benzothiadiazole and its first published synthesis was reported in a patent. The 5-chloro-2,1,3-benzothiadiazol-4-amine intermediate was a known compound, produced in three steps from 4-chlorophenylenediamine as shown. Treatment with two equivalents of thionyl chloride in pyridine formed the heterocycle, which was nitrated with sodium nitrate in sulfuric acid and reduced using iron and acetic acid.

The amine intermediate was treated with benzoyl chloride and ammonium thiocyanate followed by alkaline hydrolysis to form a thiourea. This was activated as its isothiuronium salt before being treated with ethylene diamine to give tizanidine.

=== Analogues ===
Analogues of tizanidine include clonidine and dexmedetomidine, among others.

== History ==
Tizanidine was approved for medical use in the United States in 1996.

== Society and culture ==
=== Names ===
Tizanidine is the generic name of the drug and its INN, BAN, and DCF. In the case of the hydrochloride salt, its generic name is tizanidine hydrochloride and this is its USAN and BANM. Developmental code names of tizanidine include AN-021 and DS 103-282 and its major brand names include Zanaflex and Sirdalud.

== Research ==
In addition to muscle spasticity, tizanidine was under development for the treatment of fibromyalgia and migraine, but development for these indications was discontinued. Several other formulations have also been developed for various indications, including spastic paralysis, musculoskeletal pain, and back pain, but likewise have not been marketed. An intranasal formulation was in phase 3 clinical trials for back pain as of 2017.
