= Darkcutter =

Carcass of beef

A darkcutter or dark cutter (also known as DFD, or Dark Firm Dry) is a carcass of beef that has been subjected to undue stress before slaughter, and is dark in color. Sometimes referred to as dark cutting beef, they have a dark color which makes the meat appear less fresh, making them undesirable to consumers. Darkcutters fetch a lower price than otherwise ordinary beef on the market.

Desirable meat has a slightly acidic pH level, from 5.3 to 5.7, which is a result of the conversion of glycogen to lactic acid. Poor feeding or handling will mean that no glycogen is available, so lactic acid cannot be produced to lower the pH. Stress ante mortem causes a depletion of glycogen stores in the liver and muscles. Thus the glucose normally used post mortem to produce ATP anaerobically and in turn resulting in lactic acid production before the development of rigor mortis, is unavailable. The muscle pH stays high (above 6.0), resulting in higher water-holding capacity (sticky protein) and more translucent muscle, which looks darker because light travels deeper into the muscle before being refracted.

To prevent and address darkcutting, it is suggested to keep the animals calm and well fed before culling. If the livestock do not consume enough nutrition, or deplete it while stressed by poor handling, the levels of glycogen will be reduced. Severe stress leads to a proportionate depletion in the animal's glycogen.

== See also ==
- PSE meat
