= Metaxalone =

Muscle relaxant

Clinical data
- Trade names: Skelaxin
- AHFS/Drugs.com: Monograph
- MedlinePlus: a682010
- License data: US DailyMed: Metaxalone
- Routes of administration: By mouth
- ATC code: None

Legal status
- Legal status: US: ℞-only

Pharmacokinetic data
- Bioavailability: Unknown
- Metabolism: Liver
- Elimination half-life: 9.2 ± 4.8 hours
- Excretion: Kidney

Identifiers
- IUPAC name: 5-[(3,5-dimethylphenoxy)methyl]-1,3-oxazolidin-2-one
- CAS Number: 1665-48-1
- PubChem CID: 15459
- IUPHAR/BPS: 7609
- DrugBank: DB00660
- ChemSpider: 14709
- UNII: 1NMA9J598Y
- KEGG: D00773
- ChEMBL: ChEMBL1079604
- CompTox Dashboard (EPA): DTXSID3023269
- ECHA InfoCard: 100.015.253

Chemical and physical data
- Formula: C_{12}H_{15}NO_{3}
- Molar mass: 221.256 g·mol^{−1}
- 3D model (JSmol): Interactive image
- SMILES: O=C2OC(COc1cc(cc(c1)C)C)CN2
- InChI: InChI=1S/C12H15NO3/c1-8-3-9(2)5-10(4-8)15-7-11-6-13-12(14)16-11/h3-5,11H,6-7H2,1-2H3,(H,13,14); Key:IMWZZHHPURKASS-UHFFFAOYSA-N

Metaxalone, sold under the brand name Skelaxin, is a muscle relaxant medication used to relax muscles and relieve pain caused by strains, sprains, and other musculoskeletal conditions. It is a moderately strong muscle relaxant, with relatively low incidence of side effects. Its exact mechanism of action is not known, but it may be due to general central nervous system depression. Studies in vitro have shown metaxalone to suppress production of pro-inflammatory cytokines such as TNF-α and IL-6 and increase production of the antiinflammatory cytokine IL-13, however it also inhibits MAO-A and this may both contribute to its therapeutic effects and also is linked to toxicity in overdose.

Common side effects include nausea, vomiting, drowsiness, and central nervous system (CNS) side effects, such as dizziness, headache, and irritability.

The metabolism of metaxalone involves enzymes CYP1A2 and CYP2C19 in the cytochrome P450 system. Because many medications are metabolized by enzymes in this system, precaution must be taken when administering it with other medications involving the P450 system to avoid interactions.

Because of the potential for side effects, this drug is considered high risk in the elderly.

== Pharmacokinetics ==
Metaxalone exhibits increased bioavailability when taken with food. Specifically, in one study, compared to fasted conditions, the presence of food at the time of drug administration increased C_{max} by 77.5%, AUC_{0-t} by 23.5%, and AUC_{0-∞} by 15.4%. Metaxalone is a substrate of CYP1A2 and CYP2C19, an inhibitor of CYP1A2, CYP2B6, CYP2C9, CYP2C19, CYP2D6, CYP2E1, and CYP3A, and an inducer of CYP1A2 and CYP3A4.

== Assay ==
Nirogi et al. reported a liquid chromatographic method coupled to tandem mass spectrometry for the quantification of metaxalone in human plasma. A stability-indicating HPLC method was introduced by P. K. Sahu et al. Metaxalone has been used as an internal standard for few analytical methods.
