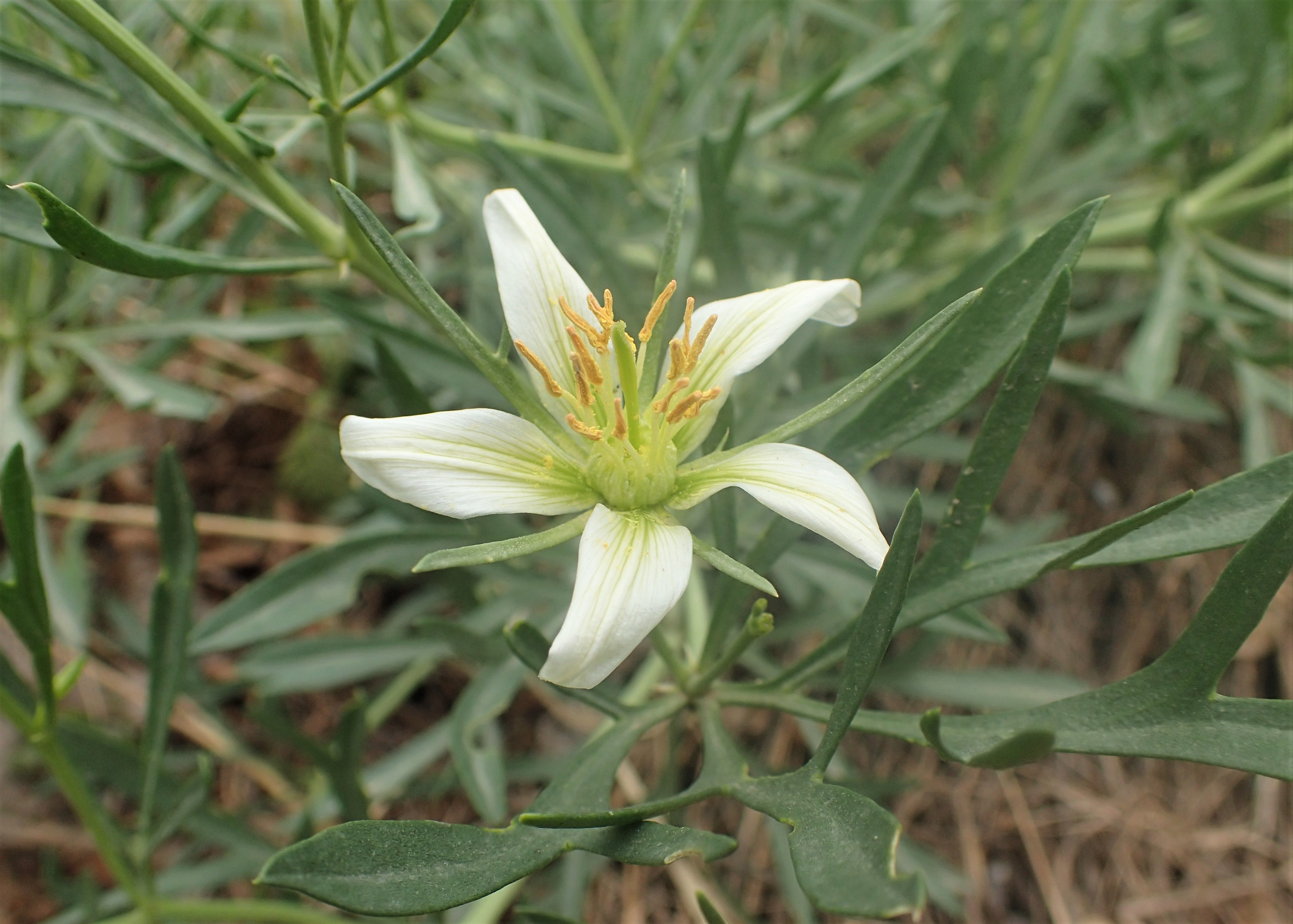
- Harmal (Peganum harmala) flower

Scientific classification
- Kingdom: Plantae
- Clade: Tracheophytes
- Clade: Angiosperms
- Clade: Eudicots
- Clade: Rosids
- Order: Sapindales
- Family: Nitrariaceae
- Genus: Peganum
- Species: P. harmala

Binomial name
- Peganum harmala L.

Varieties
- Peganum harmala var. grandifiorum; Peganum harmala var. harmala; Peganum harmala var. stenophyllum

Synonyms
- List: Harmala multifida All.; Harmala peganum Crantz; Harmala syriaca Bubani; Mesembryanthemum caspicum S.G.Gmel.; Peganon harmalum (L.) St.-Lag.; Peganum dauricum Pall.; Peganum harmala var. garamantum Maire; Peganum harmala var. rothschildianum (Buxb.) Maire; Peganum rothschildianum Buxb.

= Peganum harmala =

Plant species in the family

Peganum harmala, commonly called wild rue, Syrian rue, African rue, esfand or espand, or harmel (among other similar pronunciations and spellings), is a perennial, herbaceous plant, with a woody underground rootstock, of the family Nitrariaceae, usually growing in saline soils in temperate desert and Mediterranean regions. Its common English-language name came about because of a resemblance to rue (to which it is not related). Its seeds contain a high concentration (at least 5.9% by weight) of diverse beta-carboline alkaloids.

It has deep roots and a strong smell, finely divided leaves, white flowers rich in alkaloids, and small seed capsules containing numerous dark, oily seeds. It is native to a vast region across North Africa, southern and eastern Europe, the Middle East, Central Asia, and parts of South and East Asia, and has been introduced to countries like South Africa, Mexico, France. It grows in dry, often saline or disturbed habitats, thriving from sea level to high elevations, is pollinated mainly by insects (especially honey bees), disperses seeds mostly by dispersal vectors or human activity, and hosts a specialized beetle (Thamnurgus pegani) proposed for its biological control.

Some scholars have associated it with the sacred plant called soma or haoma in ancient Indo-Iranian texts and it has been described under various names by classical and medieval sources, with archaeological evidence suggesting its use dating back to at least ~2,700 years ago. It was first described and illustrated in the 16th century by Rembert Dodoens and later classified by botanists such as Gaspard Bauhin and Carl Linnaeus. It has several recognized varieties distinguished by morphological traits and geographic distribution, with lectotype designations refined over time to clarify its taxonomy.

In the United States, it is banned or regulated as a noxious weed in several states requiring eradication, while internationally, possession and sale of the plant or its psychoactive alkaloids are illegal or controlled in several countries, including France, Finland, Canada, and Australia. It is used as a dye, incense, and in traditional medicine. It is also toxic to livestock and difficult to eradicate.

== Etymology ==
Rue for the perennial evergreen shrub was first used in 14th century English, deriving from Old French rue (13c.) and the Latin ruta.

Espand is derived from Middle Persian spand, which is thought, along with the English word spinach, to be ultimately derived from Proto-Iranian *spanta-, 'holy' (compare Avestan 𐬯𐬞𐬆𐬧𐬙𐬀, spəṇta, 'holy', and Middle Persian spenāg, 'holy'), itself thought to be ultimately derived from Proto-Indo-European *ḱwen-.

=== Common names ===
It is known by many names across regions and languages—including "African rue" in North America, "harmel" in India and North Africa, "espand" in Persian, and other local names in Pashto, Urdu, Turkish, Chinese, Spanish, French, and ancient Aramaic, reflecting its wide cultural and geographic significance.

It is known as اسپند in Persian, which is transliterated as espand, or ispand but may also be pronounced or transliterated as sepand, sipand, sifand, esfand, isfand, aspand, or esphand depending on source or dialect. The Persian word اسپند is also the name of the last month of the year, approximately March, in the traditional Persian calendar.

African rue is a common name.

Harmel is a name used in India, Algeria, and Morocco.

It is known as spilani in Pashto. In Urdu it is known as harmal, ispand, or isband. In Turkish it is known as üzerlik. In Chinese it is 驼驼蒿, tuó tuó hāo, or 骆驼蓬, luo tuó peng.

In Spain, it is called hármala, alharma or gamarza, amongst dozens of other local names. In French, it is known as harmal.

In classical antiquity, it was known in Aramaic as šabbārā (Jewish Babylonian Aramaic: שברא, Classical Syriac: ܫܲܒܿܵܪܵܐ). In later Eastern Aramaic languages, it was also borrowed from the Middle Persian as spendā.

== Description ==
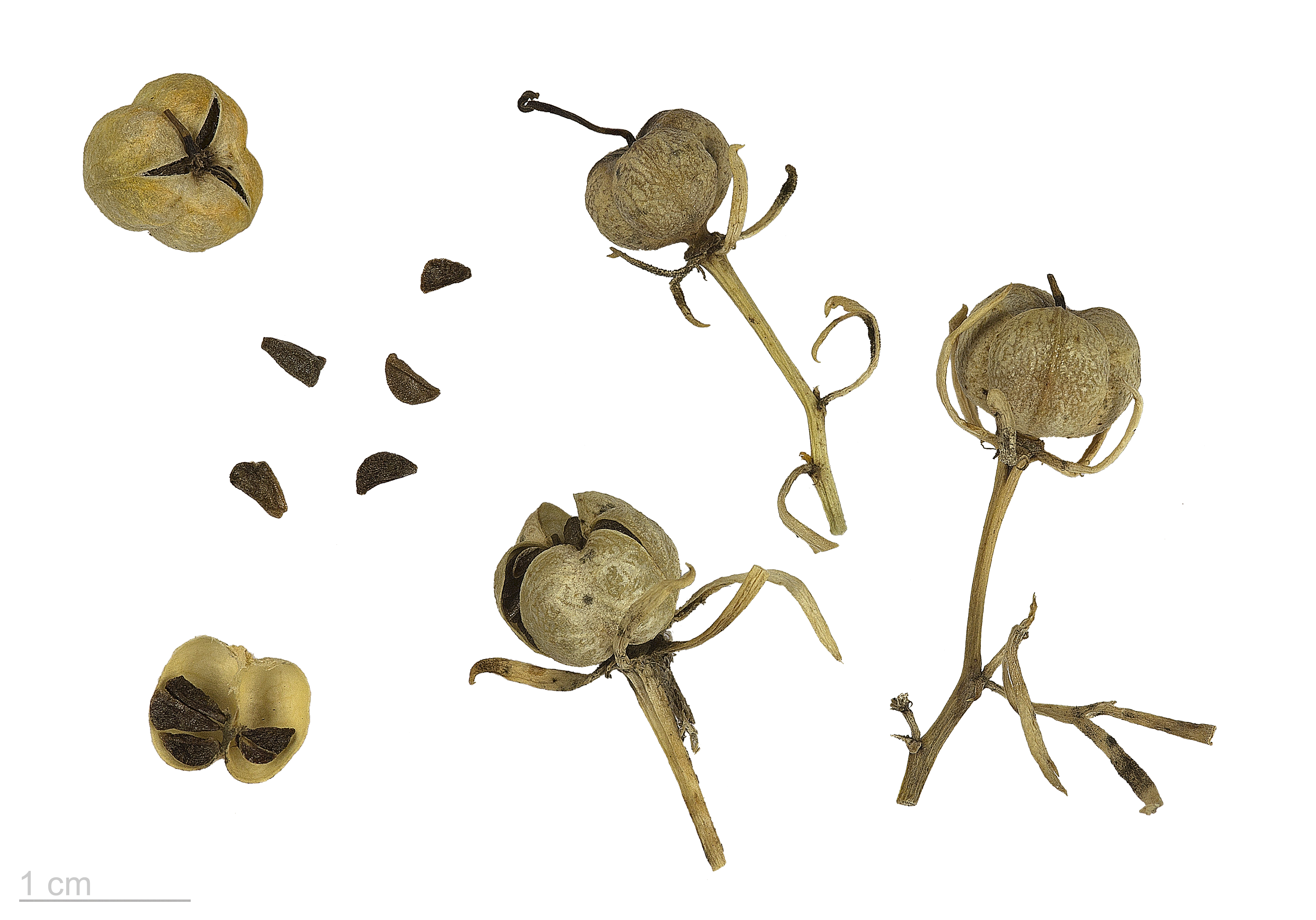
Peganum harmala – MHNT

=== Habitus ===
It is a perennial, herbaceous, suffrutescent, hemicryptophyte plant, which dies off in the winter, but regrows from the rootstock the following spring. It can grow to about 0.8 m (3 ft) tall, but normally it is about 0.3 m (1 ft) tall. The entire plant is hairless (glabrous). Plants are bad tasting and smell foul when crushed.

=== Stems ===
Numerous erect to spreading stems grow from the crown of the root-stock in the spring, these branch in a corymbose fashion.

=== Roots ===
The roots of the plant can reach a depth of up to 6.1 m (20 ft), if the soil where it is growing is very dry. The roots can grow to 2 cm (0.8 in) thick.

=== Leaves ===
The leaves are alternate, sessile, and have bristly, 1.5–2.5 mm (0.06–0.10 in) long stipules at the base. The leaf blade is dissected/forked twice or more into three to five thin, linear to lanceolate-linear, greyish lobes. The forks are irregular. The lobes have smooth margins, are 3–5 cm (1.2–2.0 in) long and 1–5 mm (0.04–0.20 in) broad, and end in points.

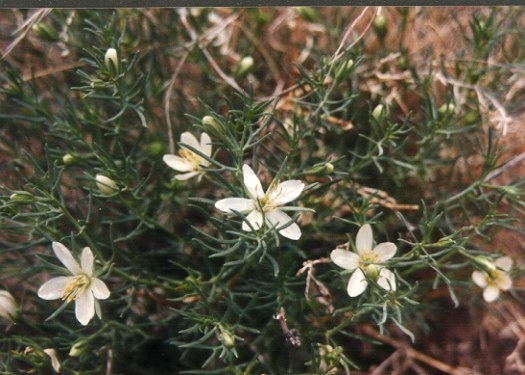
Peganum harmala

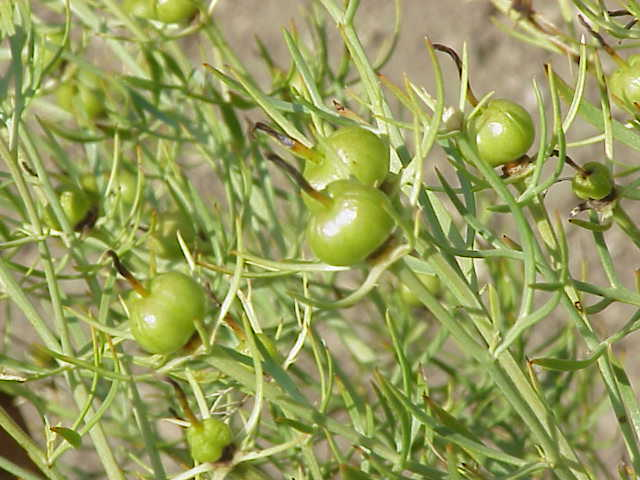
The immature fruit of Peganum harmala have persistent styles.

=== Flowers ===
It blooms with solitary flowers opposite to the leaves on the apical parts of branches. It flowers between March and October in India, between April and October in Pakistan, between May and June in China, between March and April in Israel, and between May and July in Morocco. The flowers are white or yellowish white, and are about 2–3 cm in diameter. Greenish veins are visible in the petals. They have a threadlike, 1.2 cm long pedicel. The flowers have five (10-)12–15(−20)mm long, linear, pointy-ended, glabrous sepals, often divided into lobes, although sometimes entire and only divided at the end. There are five petals which are oblong-elliptic, obovate to oblong in shape, (10-)14–15(−20)mm long, (5-)6–8(−9)mm broad, and ending with an obtuse apex. The flowers are hermaphroditic, having both male and female organs. The flowers usually have 15 stamens (rarely fewer); these have a 4-5mm long filament with an enlarged base. The dorsifixed, 6mm long anthers are longer than the filaments. The ovary is superior, and has 3 locules and ends in an 8-10mm long style, the ending 6mm of which are triangular or 3-keeled in cross-section. The ovary is surrounded by a nectary which is glabrous and has five lobes in a regular pattern.

The flowers produce only a tiny amount of nectar. The nectar is rich in hexose sugars. It contains a relatively small concentration of amino acids among which there is an especially high amount of the glutamic acid, tyrosine and proline, the last of which can be tasted by, and is favoured by, many insects. It also contains (four) alkaloids, in relatively high concentration compared to the flowers of other species, among them the toxins harmalol and harmine. The proportions and concentrations of the alkaloids in the nectar are different than in the other organs of the plant, indicating an adaptive reason for their presence.

=== Pollen ===
P. harmala has smallish, tricolpate pollen grains with a rugulate-reticulate surface. The exine has a sexine which is thicker than the nexine. These grains are well distinguishable from pollen of related plants (Nitraria) in Pakistan.

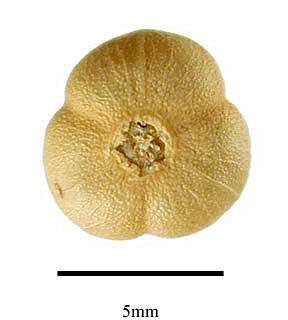
Peganum harmala fruit

=== Fruit ===
The plant fruits between July and November in China. The fruit is a dry, round seed capsule which measures about 6–10(−15) mm in diameter, These seed capsules have three chambers and carry more than 50 seeds. The end of the fruit is usually somewhat sunken inwards and retains a persistent style.

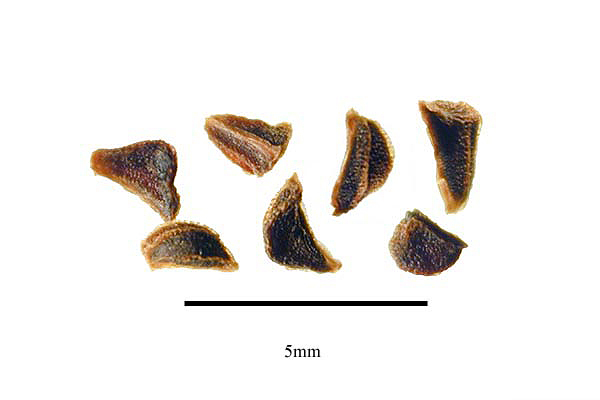
Seeds

=== Seeds ===
The seeds are colored dark brown to blackish-brown, slightly curved, triangular, about 2 mm (0.08 in) long with an irregular surface. The endosperm is oily.

=== Cytology ===
The cells have 24 chromosomes (2n), although sometimes 22 have been found.

== Distribution ==
=== Native ===
Peganum harmala is native to a wide area stretching from Morocco in north Africa and Spain and Italy in Europe, north to Serbia, Romania (possibly), Dagestan, Kazakhstan, south to Mauritania (possibly), Yemen, Saudi Arabia, Kuwait and Pakistan In Zhob district, and east to western Mongolia, northern China and possibly Bangladesh. It is a common weed in Afghanistan, Iran, parts of Israel, eastern and central Anatolia (Turkey), and Morocco.

In Africa it is known from Morocco, Algeria, Tunisia, Libya, and Egypt. It likely does not occur in Mauritania. In Morocco it is quite common and occurs throughout the country, excepting Western Sahara. In Algeria it is found mostly in the north bordering Morocco and Tunisia, being absent in the south and central regions. It is reasonably commonly found throughout Tunisia. In Libya it is found in the maritime zone, especially around Bengazi, and is not abundant. In Egypt it grows in the Sinai, has been recorded from the east of the Eastern Desert, and been rarely collected on the mid-west of the Mediterranean coast.

In Europe it is native to Spain, Corsica (disputed), much of Russia, Serbia, Moldova, Ukraine (especially in Crimea), Romania (possibly introduced), Bulgaria, Greece (including Crete and the Cyclades), Cyprus, Turkey (Thrace) and southern Italy (including Sardinia, but not Sicily). It also is native to the Caucasus: Armenia, Azerbaijan, and Georgia. On the Iberian Peninsula it is absent from Portugal and Andorra, but it is not uncommon in Spain, especially in the southeast, the Ebro depression, and the inland valleys of the Duero and Tajo, but it is rare in Andalusia (south) and it does not occur on the Balearic Islands and the Canary Islands, and in the west along the Portuguese border, Galicia, the northern coast, and the northern mountain ranges.

In Turkey it is found both in Thrace and across most of Anatolia, but is absent from the northern Black Sea coast. It is abundant in some regions of south and central Anatolia.

In Israel it is most commonly found around the Dead Sea, in the Judean mountains and desert, in the Negev and its surrounding areas, including areas in Jordan and Saudi Arabia, being rare or very rare in the northern mountains, Galilee, coastal areas and the Arava valley.

It grows in drier parts of the northern half of India but is possibly only native to the Kashmir and Ladakh regions. It also occurs in, and is possibly native to, Bangladesh.

The distribution in China is in dispute. The 2008 Flora of China considers it to be native to northern China in the provinces of Gansu, western Hebei, western Inner Mongolia, Ningxia, Qinghai, northern Shanxi, Tibet and Xinjiang. The 2017 Species Catalogue of China considers it to be restricted to Inner Mongolia, Ningxia and Gansu.

=== Adventive distribution ===
It has been added to the lists of the Global Register of Introduced and Invasive Species for the countries of South Africa, Mexico, France and Ukraine, although it is not reported as having a negative impact in any of these countries. Most Ukrainian and other references consider the plant native to Ukraine. Sources are in disagreement regarding rare collections in coastal Romania, but many consider it introduced. At least 7 occurrences have been registered in South Africa, and none in Mexico (as of 2017). As of 2020 it is included in South African National Biodiversity Institute's Plants of Southern Africa website as an introduced plant to South Africa. One database has it occurring as a non-native in Hungary.

In France it is considered a former accidental introduction once uncommonly found on the Côte d'Azur along the Mediterranean coast. It has very rarely been found elsewhere in France in the past. According to the Flora Europaea there is a native population on Corsica, however, according to Tela Botanica it does not occur on the island, either as a native or not.

It was first planted in the United States in 1928 in New Mexico by a farmer wanting to manufacture a dye called "Turkish red" from its seeds. From here the plant spread over most of southern New Mexico and the Big Bend region of Texas. An additional spread has occurred from east of Los Angeles in California to the tip of southernmost Nevada. Outside of these regions the distribution in the US is not continuous and localised. As of 2019 it has been reported in southern Arizona (in at least 3 adjacent counties), northeastern Montana (2 adjacent counties), northern Nevada (Churchill county), Oregon (town of Prineville in the Oregon High Desert) and possibly Washington. "Because it is so drought tolerant, African rue can displace the native saltbushes and grasses growing in the salt-desert shrub lands of the Western U.S."

Although the distribution in New Mexico and Texas would suggest it has spread to parts of northern Mexico, the species has not been included in the 2004 list of introduced plants of Mexico.

== Habitat and ecology ==
It grows in dry areas in the United States. It can be considered a halophyte.

In Kashmir and Ladakh it is known from elevations of 300–2400 metres (1000' to 7900'), in China 400–3600 metres (1300' to 12,000'), in Turkey 0–1500 metres (0' to 5000'), and in Spain 0–1200 metres (0' to 4000').

In China it grows in slightly saline sands near oases and dry grasslands in desert areas.

In Spain it can be found in abandoned fields, rubbish tips, stony slopes, along the verges of roads, ploughed and worked earth, as well as in disturbed, saline scrubland.

In Morocco it is said to grow in steppes, arid coasts, dry uncultivated fields and amongst ruins. A study in Morocco found that it could be used as an indicator species for rangeland degraded from agricultural activities, when found in association with certain Artemisia sp., Noaea mucronata and Anabasis aphylla. In Israel it is a common dominant plant along with Anabasis syriaca and Haloxylon scoparium in a low semi-shrubby steppe ecosystem which during dry years is almost devoid of plant cover, growing on saline, loess-derived soils. In rainy times Leontice leontopetalum and Ixiolirion tataricum appear here. It also grows in Israel in semi-steppe shrublands, Mediterranean woodlands and shrublands, and deserts. Between 800 and 1300 metres (2600' to 4300') elevation on the sandstone slopes of the mountains around Petra, Jordan, there is an open Mediterranean steppe forest dominated by Juniperus phoenicea and Artemisia herba-alba together with occasional trees of Pistacia atlantica and Crataegus aronia with common shrubs being Thymelaea hirsuta, Ephedra campylopoda, Ononis natrix, Hammada salicornia and Anabasis articulata; when this habitat is further degraded (it is already degraded) by overgrazing P. harmala along with Noaea mucronata invade. It is often found with Euphorbia virgata in the foothills of Mount Ararat, Iğdır Province, Turkey.

The flowers are pollinated by insects. Little is known about pollen vectors. A year-long study around the town of St. Katherine in the El-Tur mountains of southern Sinai found P. harmala to be exclusively pollinated by the domesticated honey bee, Apis mellifera, although it is possible these animals are displacing native bees. The floral morphology, nectar amount and composition – high in hexane sugars, presence of toxic alkaloids and high proline content together suggest pollination by short-tongued bees (see pollination syndrome).

Regarding seed dispersal it is considered a barochore. According to a Mongolian study, its seeds are exclusively dispersed by human activities, although Peganum multisectum, sometimes seen as a variety or synonym of this species, is dispersed solely by water flow.

A species of tiny, hairy beetle, Thamnurgus pegani, has been found inhabiting stems of P. harmala in Turkey and elsewhere. It feeds only on P. harmala. When the aerial parts of the plant begin to die off in the autumn, the adult beetles retreat to overwinter in the soil underneath the root-crown, or in old larval tunnels in the dead stems; emerging in the spring (May in Turkey), the females bore small holes in the now shooting stems of the plant, in which they lay their eggs. The hatched larvae bore inward toward the pith. The beetles somehow infect the surrounding tissue in the tunnels with a fungus, Fusarium oxysporum. The infected plant tissue turns blackish and is then used by the adult beetles and their larvae as a food source, until they are ready to pupate within the stem tunnels. It has been proposed as a candidate for using in biological control of P. harmala, as a relative of it, T. euphorbiae, has been approved for use against invasive Euphorbia in the United States.

== History ==
As the plant is popular in Persian cultural traditions, and is a hallucinogen, the linguists David Flattery and Martin Schwartz wrote a book in 1989 in which they theorised that the plant is the Avestan haoma mentioned in Zoroastrianism. The transcribed word haoma is thought to be likely related to the Vedic word soma; these names refer to a magical, purportedly entheogenic plant/drink that is mentioned in ancient Indo-Iranian texts but whose exact identity has been lost to history.

Metabolic analysis of residues from Iron Age censers at Qurayyah shows that in the Middle Iron Age (~2700 years ago), P. harmala was fumigated in domestic settings, likely for hygienic and therapeutic purposes.

Traces of P. harmala, and Nymphaea nouchali var. caerulea were identified in an Egyptian ritual Bes-vase, of the 2nd century BCE.

This plant was first described in a recognisable manner under the name πήγανον ἄγριον (péganon agrion) by Dioscorides, who mentions it is called μῶλυ (moly) in parts of Anatolia (although Dioscorides distinguishes the 'real' μῶλυ as another, bulbaceous plant). Galen later describes the plant under the name μῶλυ, following Dioscorides by mentioning numerous other names it was known by: ἄρμολα, armola (harmala), πήγανον ἄγριον and in Syria βησασᾶ, besasa (besasa). For much of the subsequent history of Europe Galen was seen as the pinnacle of human medical knowledge. As such, during the early Middle Ages, the herb was known as moly or herba immolum.

The 12th century Arab agriculturist Ibn al-'Awwam from Seville, Spain, wrote that the seeds were used in the baking of bread; the fumes being used to facilitate fermentation and help with the taste (he usually quotes older authors).

By the mid-16th century, Dodoens relates how apothecaries sold the plant under the name harmel as a type of extra-strength rue.

== Taxonomy ==
Rembert Dodoens in 1553, illustrated and described the plant (republished 1583 with better illustration, calling it Harmala, and basing his work on Galen and Dioscorides).

In 1596, Gaspard Bauhin had his Phytopinax published in which he attempted to list all plants known in an ordered manner. He judges Ruta sylvestris Dioscorides to be a type of Hypericum. Later, in his Pinax Theatri Botanici of 1623, he attempts to sort the synonymy in all the previously published names by the botanists from earlier in history. In this work, he sorts Ruta into five species, distinguishing this plant from the others by its three-locular fruit, large white flowers and being only known as a wild plant (as opposed to cultivated). He considers his 'Ruta sylvestris flore magno albo' (=Peganum harmala) to be (not all writers named in the following): Tabernaemontanus', Dodoens' and Clusius' Harmala; Matthias de l'Obel's Harmala syriaca; Andreas Cæsalpinus' and Conrad Gesner's (in his report on Ottoman plants) Harmel; Pietro Andrea Mattioli's and Clusius' (in another work) Ruta sylvestris Harmala; Valerius Cordus' (in his Annotations on Dioscorides), Gesner's (in his Hortus), and Aloysius Anguillara's Ruta sylvestris; and Castore Durante's and Joachim Camerarius the Younger's Ruta sylvestris secunda.

In 1753, Carl Linnaeus named the species Peganum harmala. He cites this species as based on Bauhin's Pinax Theatri Botanici of 1623, and Stirpium Historiae Pemptades Sex of 1583 by Rembert Dodoens.

=== Type ===
In 1954, Brian Laurence Burtt and Patricia Lewis designated 'Cult. in Horto Upsaliensi (Linn!)' as the lectotype for the species. This lectotype appeared to be two sheets (621.1 and 621.2) in the Linnean Herbarium, not being part of a single gathering, and hence ICBN Art. 9.15 (Vienna Code) did not apply. In 1993, Mohammed Nabil El Hadidi designated 'Clifford Herbarium 206, Peganum no. 1', stored at the British Museum of Natural History, as the lectotype for P. harmala.

=== Infraspecific variability ===
Peganum harmala var. garamantum – P. harmala var. garamantum was originally described by René Maire in 1953 in his Flore de l'Afrique du Nord. It was still recognised as occurring in Tunisia as of 2010 (along with var. typicum), although the distinction is not recognised in other works.

Peganum harmala var. grandiflorum – El Hadidi described P. harmala var. grandiflorum in 1972 for the Flora Iranica based on herbarium material collected by H. Bobek in Tal Shahdad in Kerman Province, Iran in 1956, and said the variety grew in both Iran and Afghanistan. It was subsequently collected only once more, at least as recorded in the GBIF, in 1980 in Spain near the bank of the Ebro river approximately halfway downriver to the sea from Zaragosa. It is not mentioned in the Flora Iberica.

Peganum harmala var. multisecta – First described by Karl Maximovich in 1889 from Qinghai. Sometimes incorrectly spelled var. multisectum. Occurs in Dzungaria, Hexi, Qaidam Basin, Ordos and the Altai regions in China and Mongolia. In China it occurs in the provinces of Inner Mongolia, northern Shanxi, Ningxia, Gansu, Qinghai, Xinjiang, and Tibet (the Flora of China claims it is endemic to China). It can be distinguished by having the sepals (called 'calyx leaves' in one study) incised with 3–5 lobes, instead of being entire as in the nominate form (P. nigellastrum, which also occurs in the region, has this characteristic even more pronounced, but with the calyx leaves split into 5–7 thin string-like lobes), and by having leaves which are more dissected or may be trisected. The leaves are dissected to 3–5 lobes in the nominate form – the individual leaf lobes being 1.5–3 mm wide, whereas this variety always has more than 5 lobes 1–1.5 mm wide. The nominate form has seeds with a depressed surface, whereas var. multisecta has seeds with convex surface. Furthermore, the stems of this variety sprawl prostrate upon the ground, whereas the nominate has erect stems, and the variety has stems which are pubescent when young as opposed to always glabrous. Some consider it better to classify it as an independent species, P. multisectum (fide Bobrov, 1949). Others consider it a synonym of the nominate form.

Peganum harmala var. rothschildianum – Originally described by cactus specialist Franz Buxbaum in 1927 as P. rothschildianum from northern Africa. Subsumed as a variety by René Maire in 1953. Not recognised for Tunisia, nor elsewhere.

Peganum harmala var. stenophyllum – This variety is still accepted by some authorities, although it is not recognised in the Flora of Pakistan. Pierre Edmond Boissier described it in 1867 and it has been recognised as growing in Iran, Iraq, Afghanistan, Pakistan, India, Tajikistan, and the northern Caucasus. In India it is found in Kashmir, Punjab, Haryana, Rajasthan, Uttar Pradesh, Gujarat, Maharashtra and Karnataka. It can be distinguished from the nominate form by having finer leaves with more narrow lobes, shorter sepals and broader-shaped seed capsules.

== Legal issues ==
In the United States, it is considered an invasive, noxious weed in the following states: Arizona (prohibited noxious weed), California (A listed noxious weed), Colorado (A listed noxious weed), Nevada (noxious weed), New Mexico (class B noxious weed), and Oregon (A designated weed, under quarantine). This may require land owners to exterminate infestations on their land or be fined, and allows access to government grants to buy herbicides to do so. It is illegal to sell plants of this species in the states listed above. Since 2005, with caveats, the cultivation, possession or sale of this species is also illegal in Louisiana.

Since 2005, the possession of the seeds, the plant itself, and the alkaloids harmine and harmaline, which it contains, is illegal in France. In Finland, the plant is officially listed as a medicinal plant, which means one would require a doctors prescription to acquire it. In Canada, harmaline is illegal. In Australia, harmala alkaloids are illegal.

== Uses ==
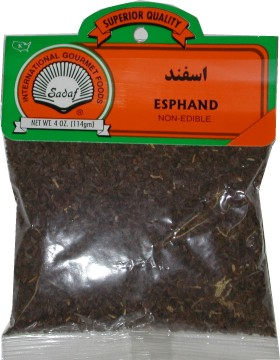
Peganum harmala seeds as sold in Iran and Middle Eastern foods grocery store as incense

=== Weed and livestock poisoning ===
In some regions, it is a common weed. In China, it is seen as a noxious weed, invasive in overgrazed areas. In the United States, where it is not native, it is officially registered as a noxious weed or similar designation in Arizona, California, Colorado, Nevada, New Mexico and Oregon. Infestations can be invasive and very difficult to exterminate. It is also known as an agricultural seed contaminant. It often causes livestock poisonings, especially during drought. Consumption by animals causes reduced fertility and abortions. Leaves and seeds are considered poisonous due to the β-carbolines such as: harmalol, harman harmaline, harmine, and quinazoline derivatives they contain. Side effects after ingestion can manifest themselves as hallucinations, neurosensory syndromes, bradycardia, nausea, vomiting.

Control is possible only with powerful herbicides. Manually uprooting the plants is near impossible and there are no methods of biological control currently awaiting approval. The rootstock contains starches that help the plant survive being defoliated and is thick and grows very deep, and the crown of the plant is safe below the surface.

=== Dyes ===
A red dye, "Turkey red", from the seeds (but usually obtained from madder) is often used in western Asia to dye carpets. It is also used to dye wool. When the seeds are extracted with water, a yellow fluorescent dye is obtained. If they are extracted with alcohol, a red dye is obtained. The stems, roots and seeds can be used to make inks, stains and tattoos. According to one source, for a time the traditional Ottoman fez was dyed with the extract from this plant.

=== Traditional medicine and superstitions ===
In Iran and neighbouring countries such as Turkey and Azerbaijan, dried capsules from the plant are strung and hung in homes or vehicles to protect against the evil eye. It is widely used for protection against Djinn in Morocco (see Légey "Essai de Folklore marocain", 1926).

Esfand (called ''isband'' in Kashmiri) is traditionally burnt in Kashmiri weddings to create an auspicious atmosphere. It is also used on other ceremonial and festive occasions, as well as in households, for its fragrant smoke and to ward off negative energies.

Burning esfand seeds is also common in Persian cultures for warding off the evil eye, as in Persian weddings.

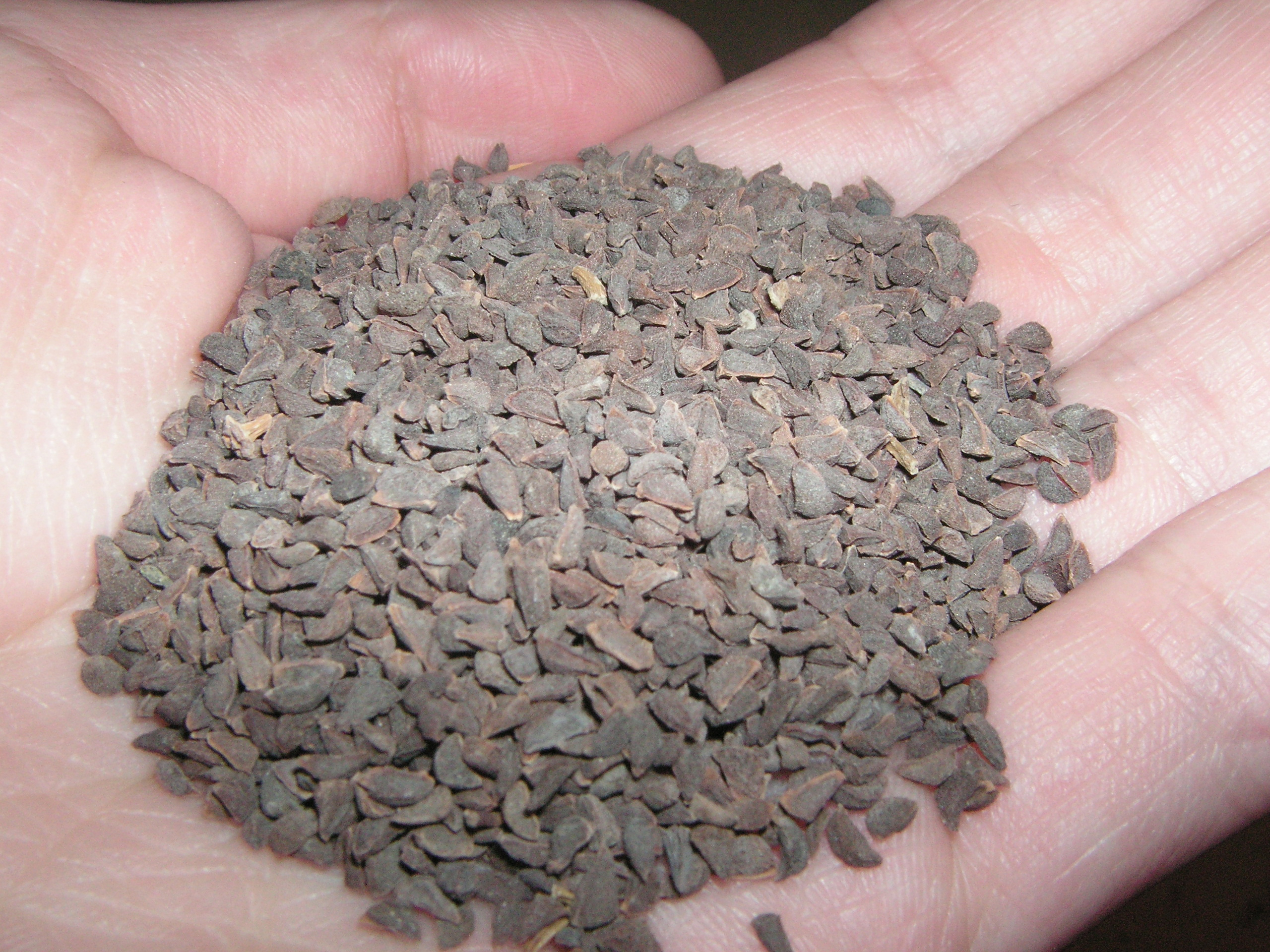
Syrian rue

In Yemen, the Jewish custom of old was to bleach wheaten flour on Passover, in order to produce a clean and white unleavened bread. This was done by spreading whole wheat kernels upon a floor, and then spreading stratified layers of African rue (Peganum harmala) leaves upon the wheat kernels; a layer of wheat followed by a layer of Wild rue, which process was repeated until all wheat had been covered over with the astringent leaves of this plant. The wheat was left in this state for a few days, until the outer kernels of the wheat were bleached by the astringent vapors emitted by the wild rue. Afterwards, the wheat was taken up and sifted, to rid them of the residue of leaves. They were then ground into flour, which left a clean and white batch of flour.

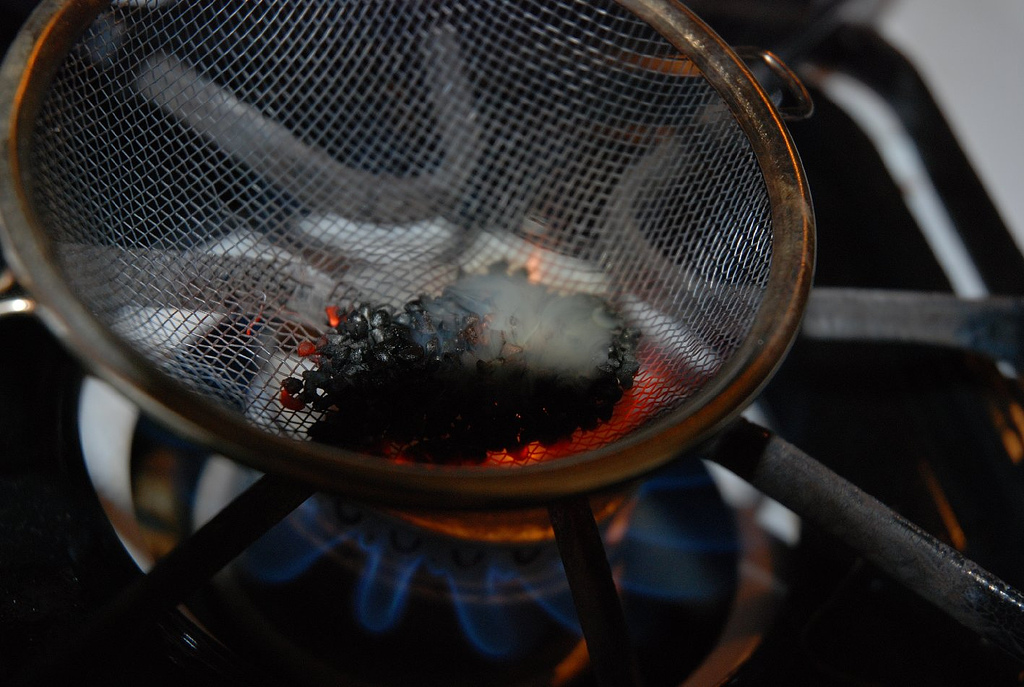
Peganum harmala seeds heated over a gas flame as incense

Peganum harmala has been used as an analgesic, emmenagogue, and abortifacient agent.

In a certain region of India, the root was applied to kill body lice.

It is also used as an anthelmintic (to expel parasitic worms). Reportedly, the ancient Greeks used the powdered seeds to get rid of tapeworms and to treat recurring fevers (possibly malaria).

As related in Des Cruydboeks of 1554 by Rembert Dodoens, in Europe, this plant was considered to be a wild type of rue and identical in medicinal uses -the identity of the two plants and their Ancient Greek and Roman uses had merged, though it was considered stronger, even dangerously so. It could be bought under the name harmel in the apothecaries, and was also known as 'wild' or 'mountain' rue. It could be used for a few dozen ailments, such as to treat women of their natural disease when the leaves were used in only water, or when the juice were drunk with wine and the leaves pressed against the wound it could cure bites and stings from rabid dogs, scorpions, bees and wasps and the like. From supposedly Pliny, he relates how those covered in the sap, or having eaten it sober, would be immune to poison for a day, as well as to poisonous beasts. Other cures were for 'drying' sperm, 'purifying' women after childbirth, curing earache, getting rid of spots and blemishes on the skin, and soothing bumps and pain caused by hitting something, among many others. All the cures call for either juice or the leaves; none call for the seeds.

=== Entheogenic use ===
Peganum harmala seeds have been used as a substitute for Banisteriopsis caapi in ayahuasca analogs, as they contain monoamine oxidase inhibitors that enable dimethyltryptamine (DMT) to be orally active. It has also been used in Changa, a DMT-infused smoking blend.

Oral doses and durations of β-carbolines or harmala alkaloids
Compound	Chemical name	Dose (hallucinogen)	Potency	Dose (MAOI)	Duration
Harman	1-Methyl-β-carboline	>250 mg	Unknown	>250 mg	Unknown
Harmine	7-Methoxyharman	>300 mg	≤50%	140–250 mg	6–8 hours
Harmaline	7-Methoxy-3,4-dihydroharman	150–400 mg	100%	70–150 mg	5–8 hours
Tetrahydroharmine	7-Methoxy-1,2,3,4-tetrahydroharman	≥300 mg	~33%	Unknown	Unknown
6-Methoxyharmalan	6-Methoxy-3,4-dihydroharman	~100 mg	~150%	Unknown	Unknown
6-MeO-THH	6-Methoxy-1,2,3,4-tetrahydroharman	≥100 mg	~50%	Unknown	Unknown
P. harmala seeds	–	≥5–28 g^{a}	–	3–5 g^{a}	Unknown
Footnotes: ^{a} = P. harmala seeds in ground form. They contain 2–7% harmala alkaloids, with 1 teaspoon ≈ 3 g ≈ 60–180 mg alkaloids; 1 tablespoon ≈ 9 g ≈ 200–600 mg alkaloids; and 1 large (OO) gelatin capsule ≈ 0.7 g ≈ 15–45 mg alkaloids. For comparison, B. caapi contains 0.05–1.95% (average 0.45%) harmala alkaloids. Note: Harmine and other β-carbolines have also been tested by non-oral routes such as sublingual, subcutaneous injection, intramuscular injection, and intravenous injection. Refs: See template page.

== Alkaloids ==
Harmaline

Vasicine

Two of the alkaloids of Peganum harmala

=== Seed alkaloids ===
Total harmala alkaloids were at least 5.9% of dried weight, in one study.

Constituents of P. harmala

Beta-carboline	Content
1-hydroxy-7-methoxy-β-carboline	
2-aldehyde-tetrahydroharmine	
3-hydroxylated harmine	
6-methoxytetrahydro-1-norharmanone	
8-hydroxy-harmine	
Acetylnorharmine	
Desoxypeganine	
Dihydroruine	
Dipegene	
Harmalacidine (HMC)	
Harmalacinine	
Harmalanine	
Harmalicine	
Harmalidine	
Harmaline (dihydroharmine, DHH, harmidine)	0.25%–0.79%–5.6%
Harmalol	0.6%–3.90%
Harmane (harman)	0.16%
Harmic acid	
Harmic acid methyl ester	
Harmine (banisterine, telepathinec, yageine)	0.44%–1.84%–4.3% The coatings of the seeds are said to contain large amounts of harmine.
Harmine N-oxide	
Harmol	
Isoharmine	
Isopeganine	
Norharman	
Norharmine (tetrahydro-beta-carboline)	
Pegaharmine A	
Pegaharmine B	
Pegaharmine C	
Pegaharmine D	
Pegaharmine E	
Pegaharmine F	
Pegaharmine G	
Pegaharmine H	
Pegaharmine I	
Pegaharmine J	
Pegaharmine K	
Peganine A	
Peganine B	
Peganumal A	
Peganumal B	
Peganumine A	
Peganumine B	
Ruine	
Tetrahydroharman	
Tetrahydroharmine (THH, leptaflorine)	0.1%
Tetrahydroharmol	
Tetrahydronorharman	
