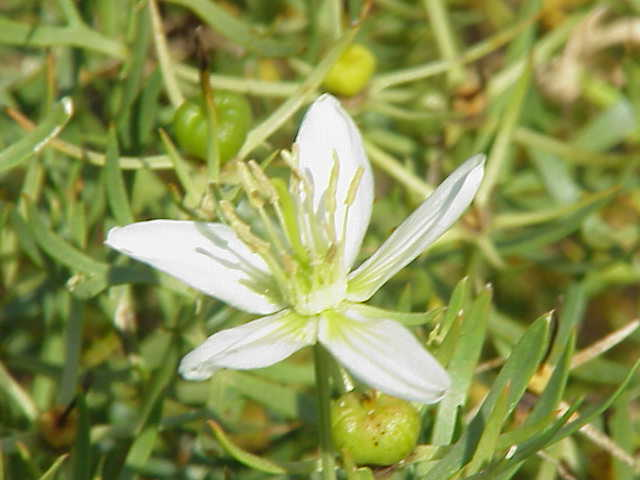
- Syrian rue (Peganum harmala)

Scientific classification
- Kingdom: Plantae
- Clade: Tracheophytes
- Clade: Angiosperms
- Clade: Eudicots
- Clade: Rosids
- Order: Sapindales
- Family: Nitrariaceae
- Genus: Peganum; L.

Species
- See text

= Peganum =

Genus of flowering plants

Peganum L. is a genus under the recently separated family Nitrariaceae. Formerly it used to be included in the family Zygophyllaceae.

== Phylogeny and Species ==
The genus has around five species, occurring in warm temperate to subtropical regions across the world:

- Peganum harmala L. (Harmal or Syrian rue) — Mediterranean region east to China
- Peganum mexicanum Gray — Mexico
- Peganum multisectum (Maxim.) Bobrov — China, Mongolia
- Peganum nigellastrum Bunge — China
- Peganum texanum M.E.Jones — southern North America

Phylogenetic data suggests the following relationships:

- Nitraria (outgroup)
- Peganum
  - P. multisectum
  - - P. harmala
    - P. nigellastrum
