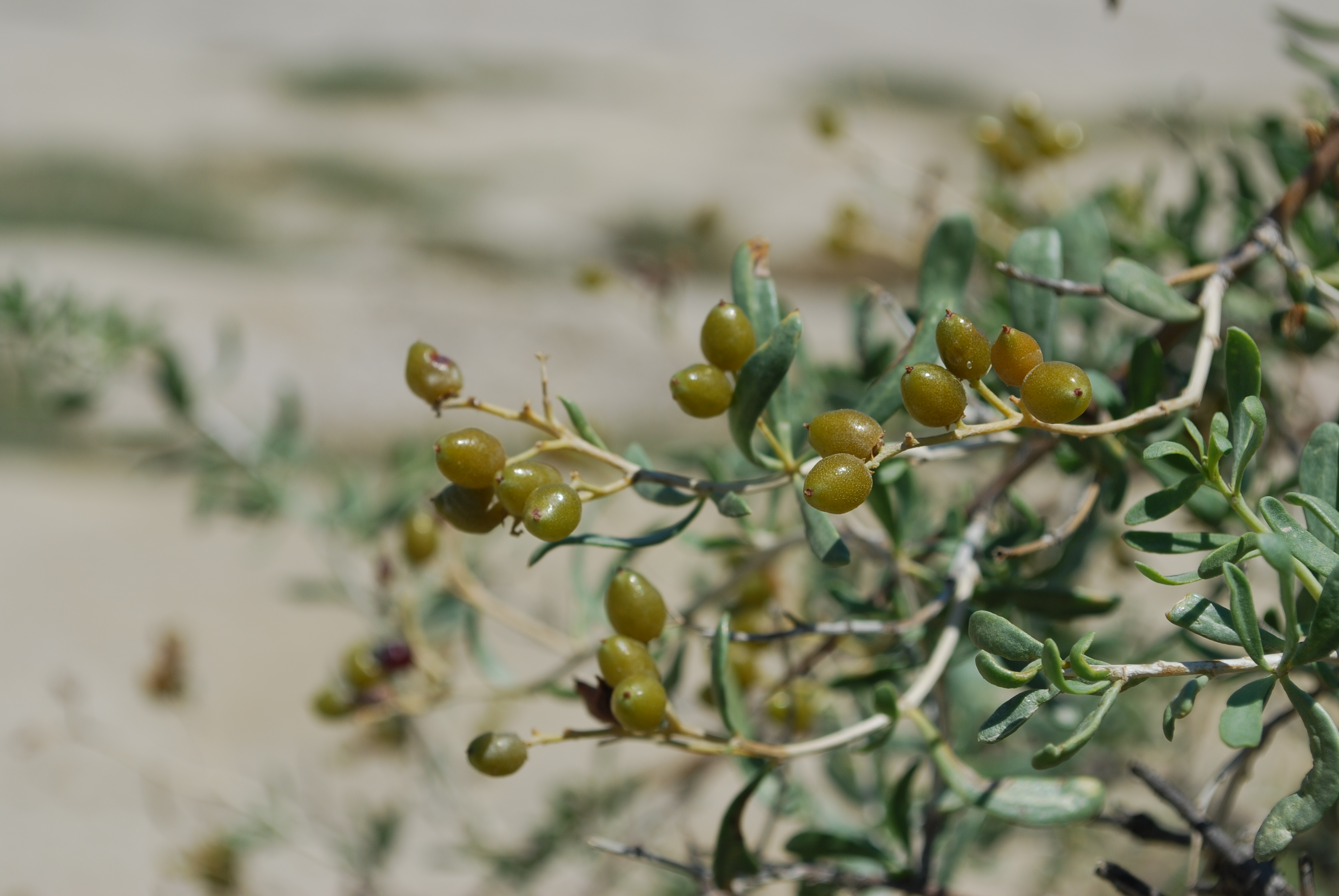
- Unripe fruit at the Berca Mud Volcanoes, Romania

Scientific classification
- Kingdom: Plantae
- Clade: Tracheophytes
- Clade: Angiosperms
- Clade: Eudicots
- Clade: Rosids
- Order: Sapindales
- Family: Nitrariaceae
- Genus: Nitraria
- Species: N. schoberi

Binomial name
- Nitraria schoberi L.

Synonyms
- Nitraria caspica Willd. ex Pall.; Nitraria oliveri Jaub. & Spach; Osyris schoberi Pall. ex A.DC.; Zygophyllum australasicum Miq.; Zygophyllum nitraria L.

= Nitraria schoberi =

Species of flowering plant

Nitraria schoberi, the nitrebush (a name it shares with other members of its genus), is a species of flowering plant in the family Nitrariaceae. It has an Irano-Turanian distribution. Its fruit, edible and salty-sweet, are collected by local peoples and eaten fresh or preserved. Archeological evidence shows that people have been eating the fruit since Epipalaeolithic times.
