= Nitre (disambiguation) =

Although, in modern usage, the word “nitre” (alternatively spelt “niter”) usually refers to the mineral form of potassium nitrate, it may also refer to a variety of other minerals and chemical compounds, including

- potassium carbonate
- sodium carbonate
- sodium nitrate

See also Nitraria billardierei, found in Australia and also called Nitre Bush.
