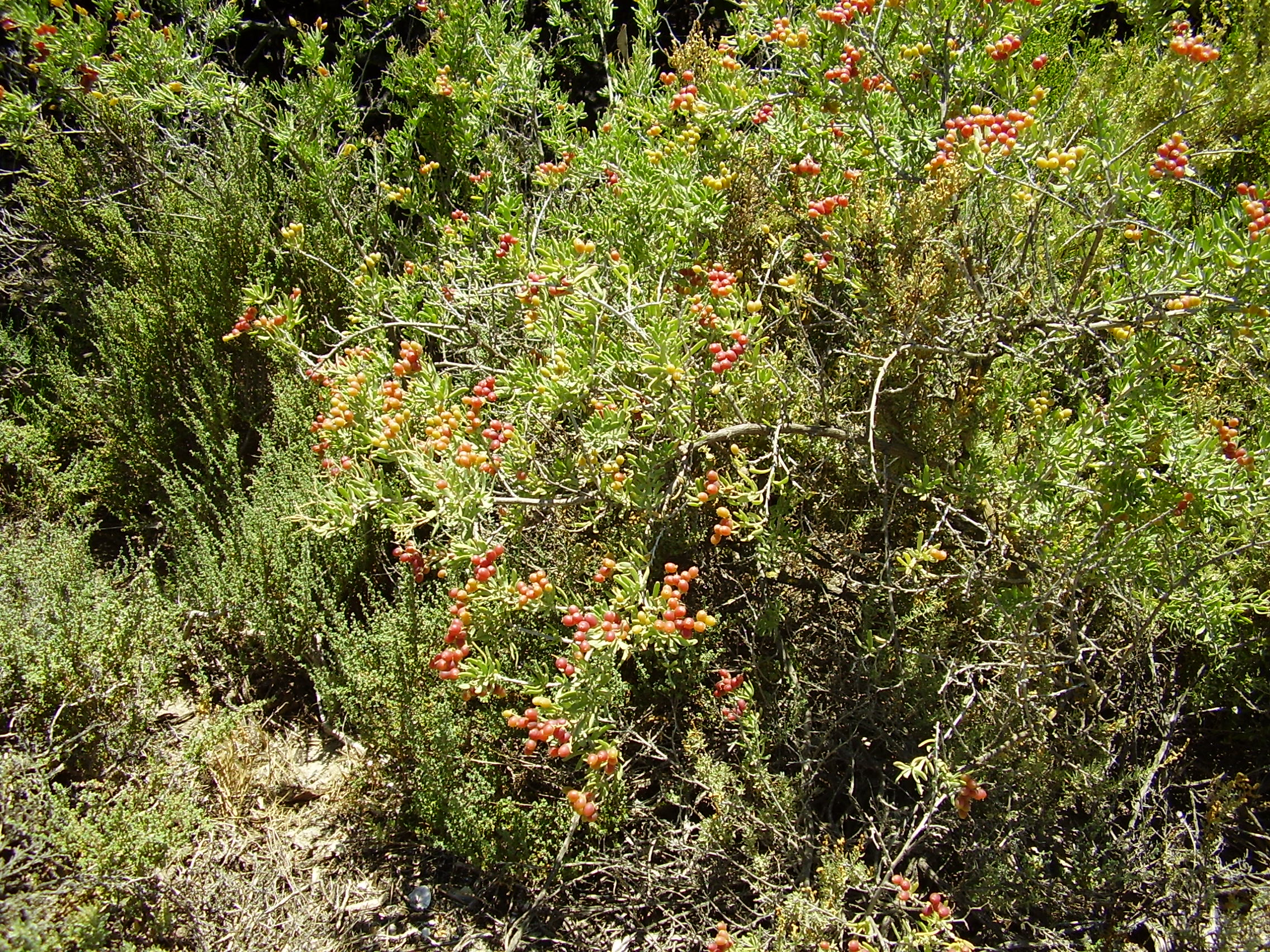

Scientific classification
- Kingdom: Plantae
- Clade: Tracheophytes
- Clade: Angiosperms
- Clade: Eudicots
- Clade: Rosids
- Order: Sapindales
- Family: Nitrariaceae
- Genus: Nitraria
- Species: N. billardierei

Binomial name
- Nitraria billardierei DC.

= Nitraria billardierei =

Nitre bush

Species of plant

Nitraria billardierei, commonly known as nitre bush or dillon bush, is a perennial shrub native to Australia. It is often found in saline areas or other areas which have been disturbed. This species produces flowers predominantly in spring, with small ovoid or oblong fruit (drupe) that are purple, red or golden. The fruit are edible, said to taste like salty grapes. They were eaten, sometimes whole, including the stone, by indigenous Australians such as the Wemba-Wemba. The English name "dillon" is from Wemba Wemba dilanj. Fruit can also be made into jam or dried and stored. It is a broad and low shrub, up to 2 metres (7 ft) high and 4 m wide.

Nitre bush is found across all mainland states of Australia. The plant's spread and germination in areas of heavy clay soil is assisted by the fruit's consumption by emus.
