= Peganum nigellastrum =

Scientific classification
- Kingdom: Plantae
- Clade: Tracheophytes
- Clade: Angiosperms
- Clade: Eudicots
- Clade: Rosids
- Order: Sapindales
- Family: Nitrariaceae
- Genus: Peganum
- Species: P. nigellastrum

Binomial name
- Peganum nigellastrum Bunge 1835

Species of flowering plant

Peganum nigellastrum (Chinese: 骆驼蒿; pinyin: luo tuo hao) is a plant species in the genus Peganum. "Peganum nigellastrum is distributed in China (west and west north of Pekin) and east Siberia (near Khyagt village). This species has also been recorded in the subprovinces of Mongolia and Tsinhai" and is found in the Hami region, a prefecture-level city, of Xinjiang Uygur Autonomous Region, China.

== Biochemistry ==
The plant contains phytochemicals:

- Canthin-6-one alkaloids:
  - Luotonin C
  - Luotonin D
- Phenylpropanoids:
  - Dihydrosinapyl ferulate
  - Dihydroconiferyl ferulate

In aerial parts:

- Other alkaloids:
  - Harmine
  - 3-phenylquinoline,
  - 3-(4-hydroxyphenyl)quinoline and
  - 3-(1H-indol-3-yl)quinoline

== Dispersal ==
Peganum nigellastrum is stoloniferous and grows in patches from 100 to 200 m wide. Seeds are dispersed by wind, a form of dispersal known as anemochory and by humans in steppe, forest-steppe habitats; around cities and can be dispersed at least 300 km away from desert steppe by human activities.
