= Tetradiclis =

Scientific classification
- Kingdom: Plantae
- Clade: Tracheophytes
- Clade: Angiosperms
- Clade: Eudicots
- Clade: Rosids
- Order: Sapindales
- Family: Nitrariaceae
- Genus: Tetradiclis; Steven ex M.Bieb.

Genus of flowering plants

Tetradiclis is a genus of flowering plants belonging to the family Nitrariaceae.

Its native range is Europe, Pakistan, Africa and Temperate Asia.

Species:

- Tetradiclis corniculata Khalk.
- Tetradiclis tenella (Ehrenb.) Litv.
