= Berca Mud Volcanoes =

Geological site in Buzău County, Romania

Coordinates: 45°21′N 26°43′E

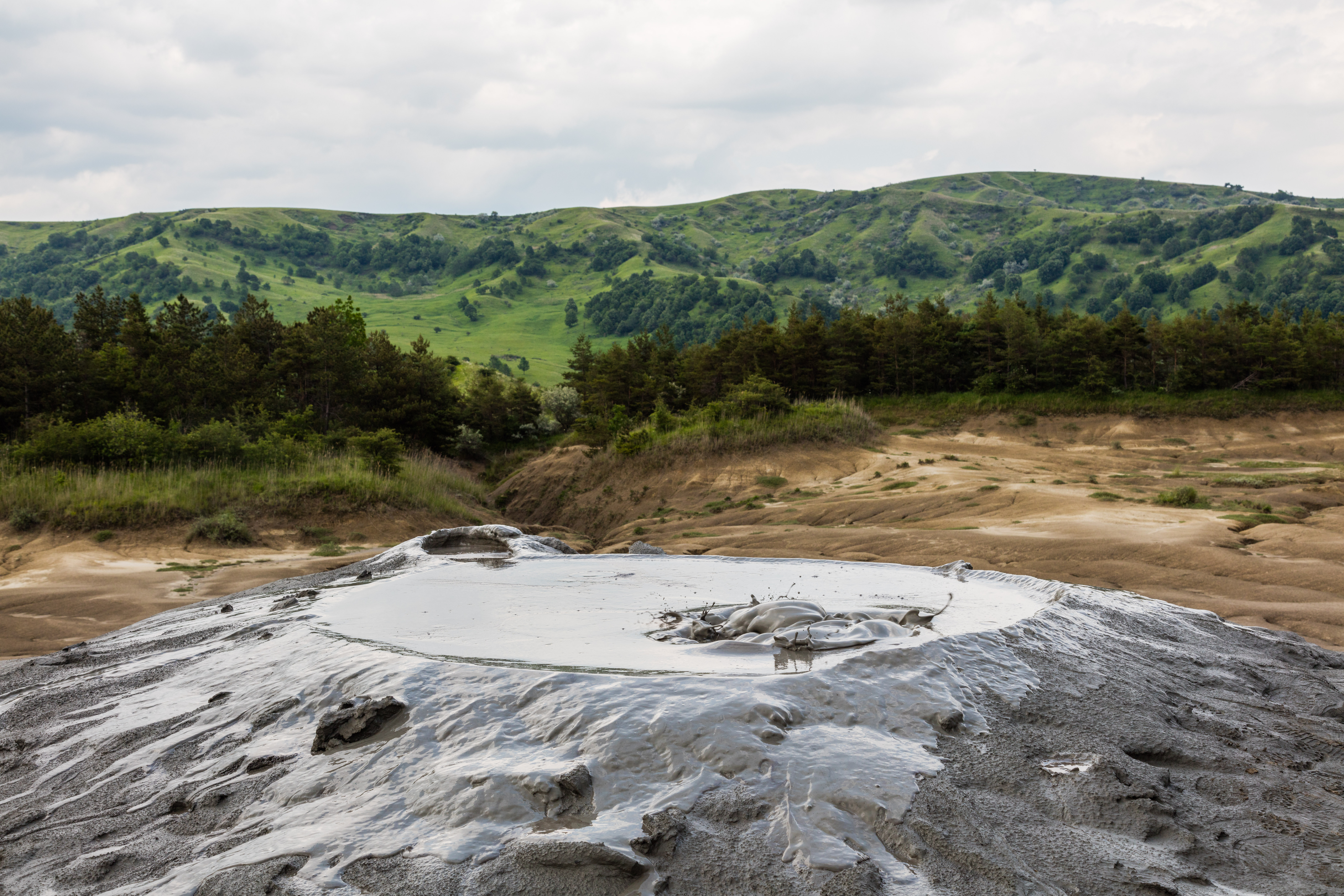
The biggest mud volcano from Vulcanii Noroioși de la Pâclele Mici.

The Berca Mud Volcanoes (Romanian: Noroioși de la Pâclele Mici) is a geological and botanical reservation located in Scorțoasa commune close to Berca in Buzău County in Romania. Its most spectacular feature is the mud volcanoes, small volcano-shaped structures typically a few metres high caused by the eruption of mud and natural gases.

== The geological phenomenon ==
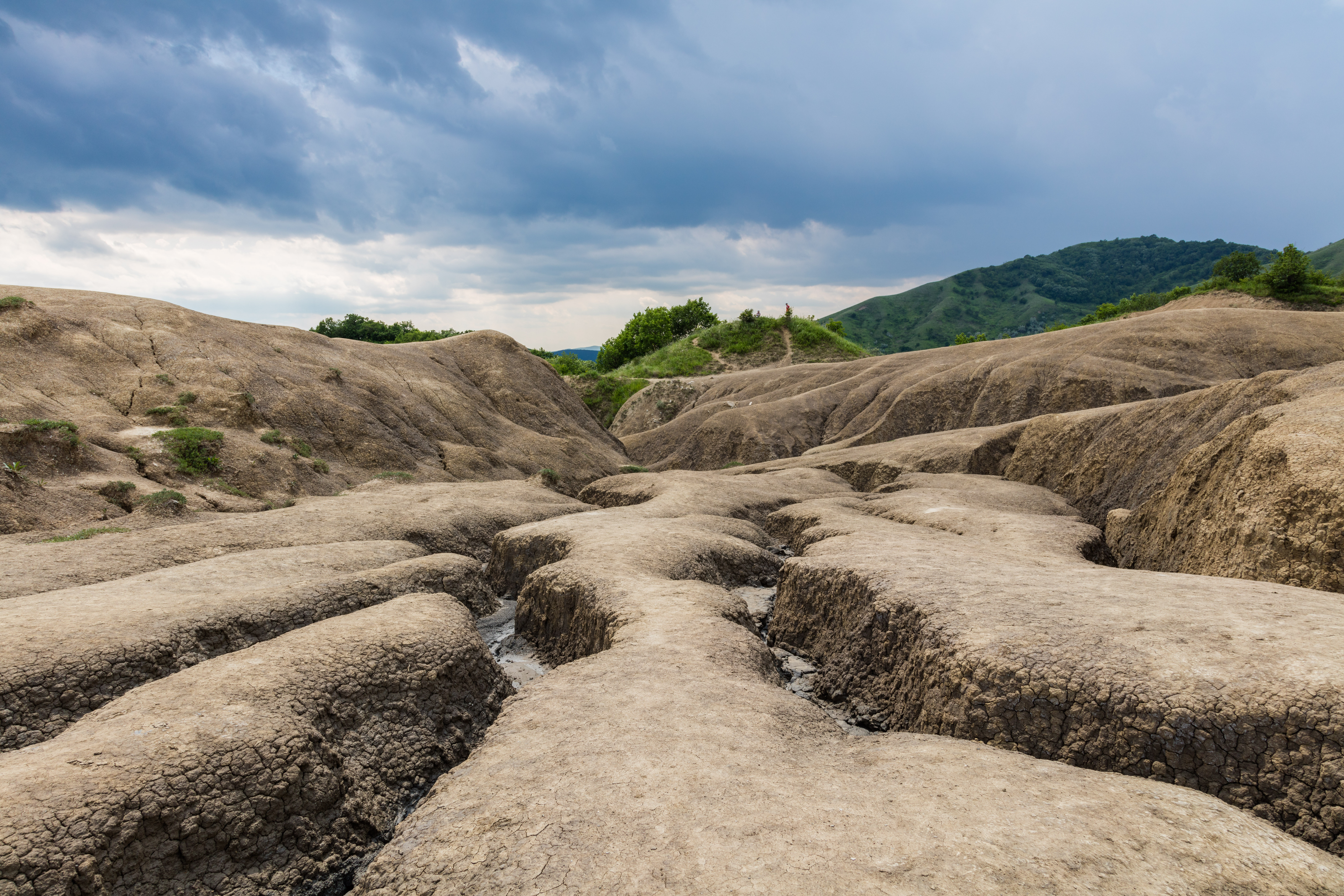
The surrounding landscape formed by the dried off volcanic mud

As the gases erupt from 3000 metres deep towards the surface, through the underground layers of clay and water, they push up underground salty water and mud, so that they overflow through the mouths of the volcanoes, while the gas emerges as bubbles. The mud dries off at the surface, creating a relatively solid conical structure resembling a real volcano. The mud expelled by them is cold, as it comes from inside the Earth's continental crust layers, and not from the mantle.

The reservation is unique in Romania. Elsewhere in Europe, similar phenomena can be observed in Italy (northern Apennines and Sicily), Ukraine (in the Kerch Peninsula), Russia (in the Taman Peninsula) as well as Azerbaijan.

== Gases ==
There are several sites (the main tourist sites being Pâclele Mari and Pâclele Mici), and gas analysis shows that the composition varies from site to site, but is mainly methane, with approximately 2% carbon dioxide, and 2–15% nitrogen. More details are given in Etiope et al.

== Flora ==
The mud volcanoes create a strange lunar landscape, due to the absence of vegetation around the cones. Vegetation is scarce because the soil is very salty, an environmental condition in which few plants can survive. However, this kind of environment is good for some rare species of plants, such as Nitraria schoberi and Obione verrucifera as these plants can survive the high salt levels in the soil.

== Tourism ==
The phenomenon can be observed on two separate locations near the Berca commune, dubbed the Little Mud Volcanoes and The Big Mud Volcanoes. The volcanoes themselves are surrounded by 'badlands' of water-cut ravines. Admission fees are charged (4 RON/adult in 2017) and (since you're walking on a crust of dried mud that is not entirely solid yet and will most likely never be solid) access is only permitted on dry days to prevent destruction of the unique environment.

== Gallery ==
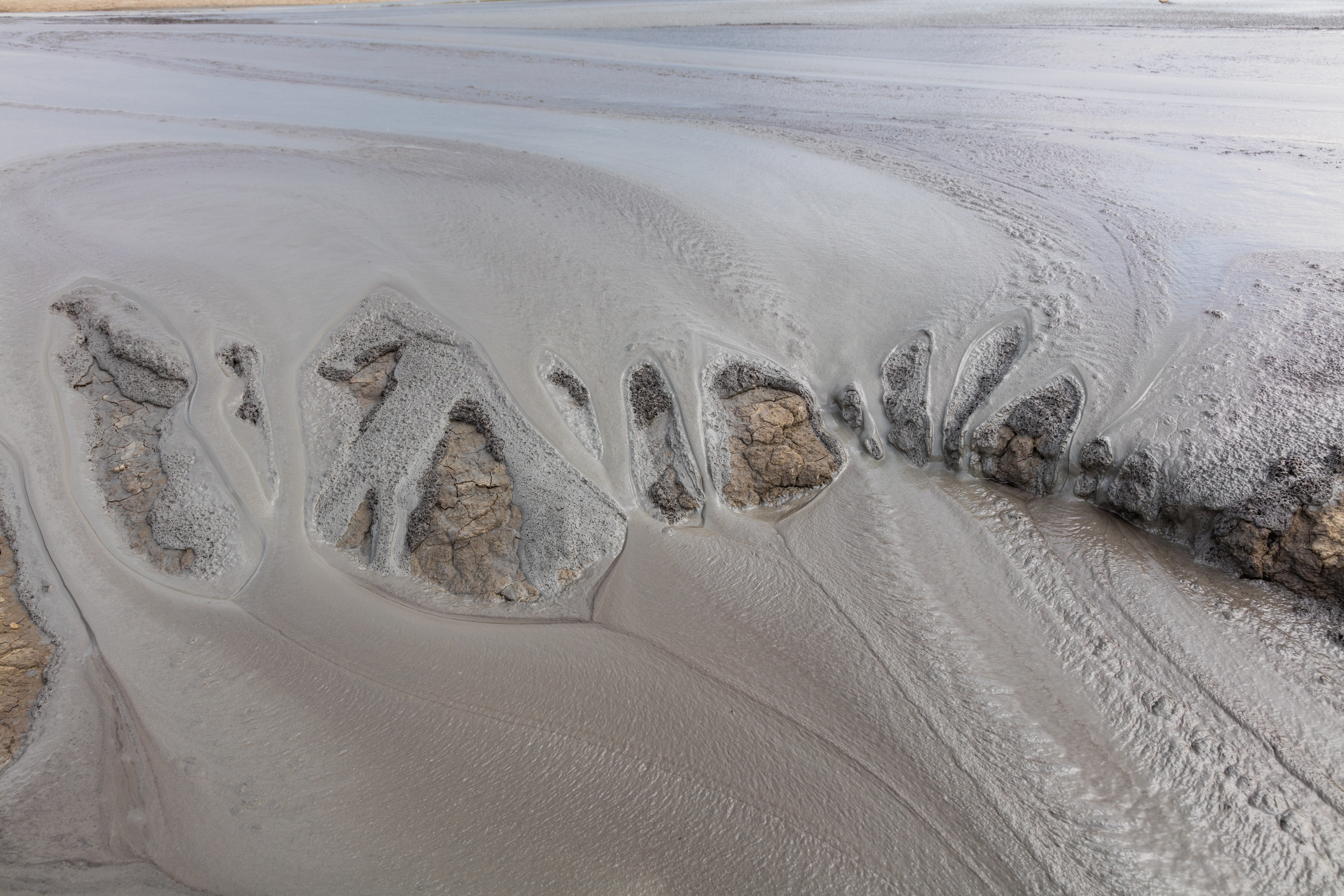
Detail view of the mud

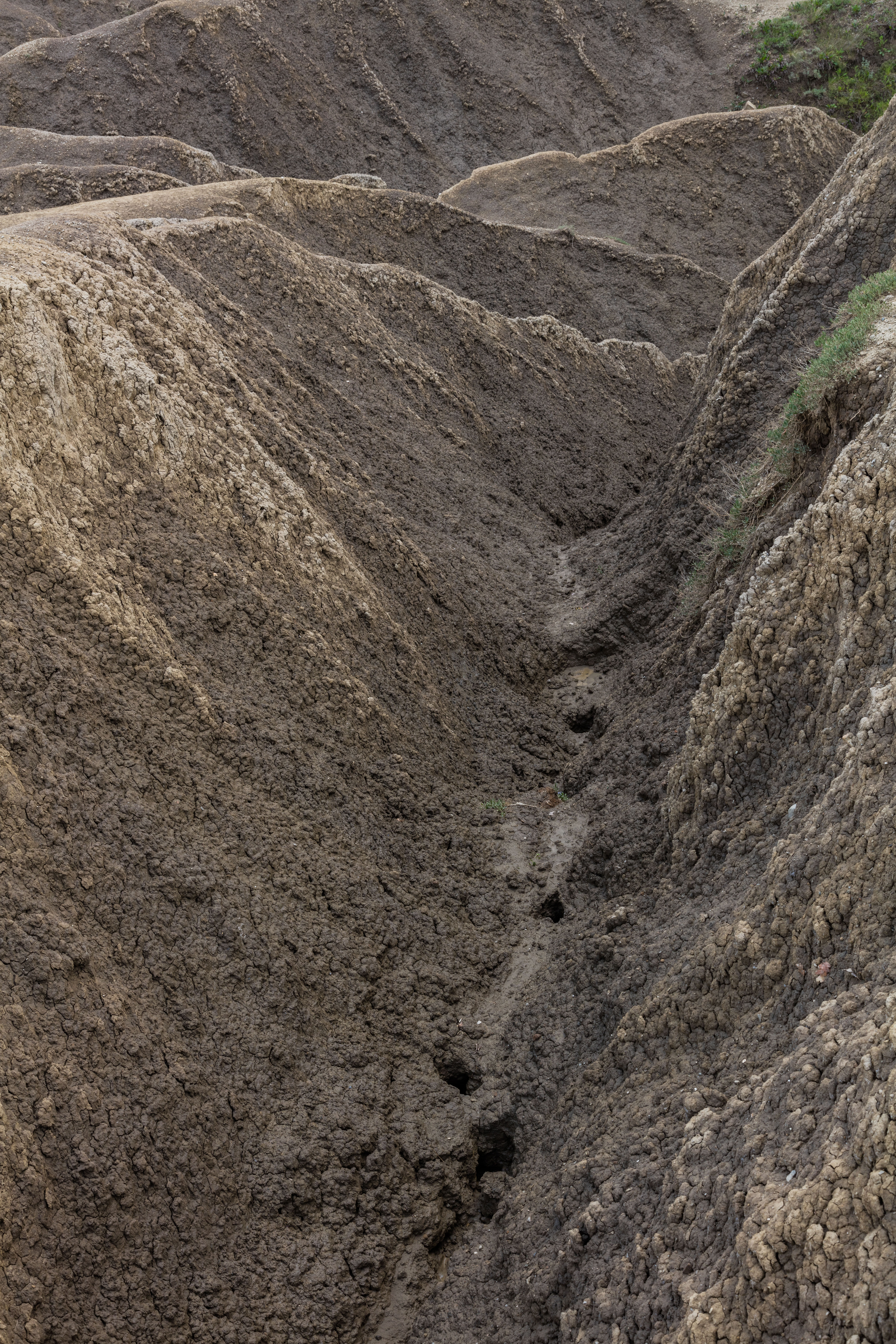
View of a mud flow from the base

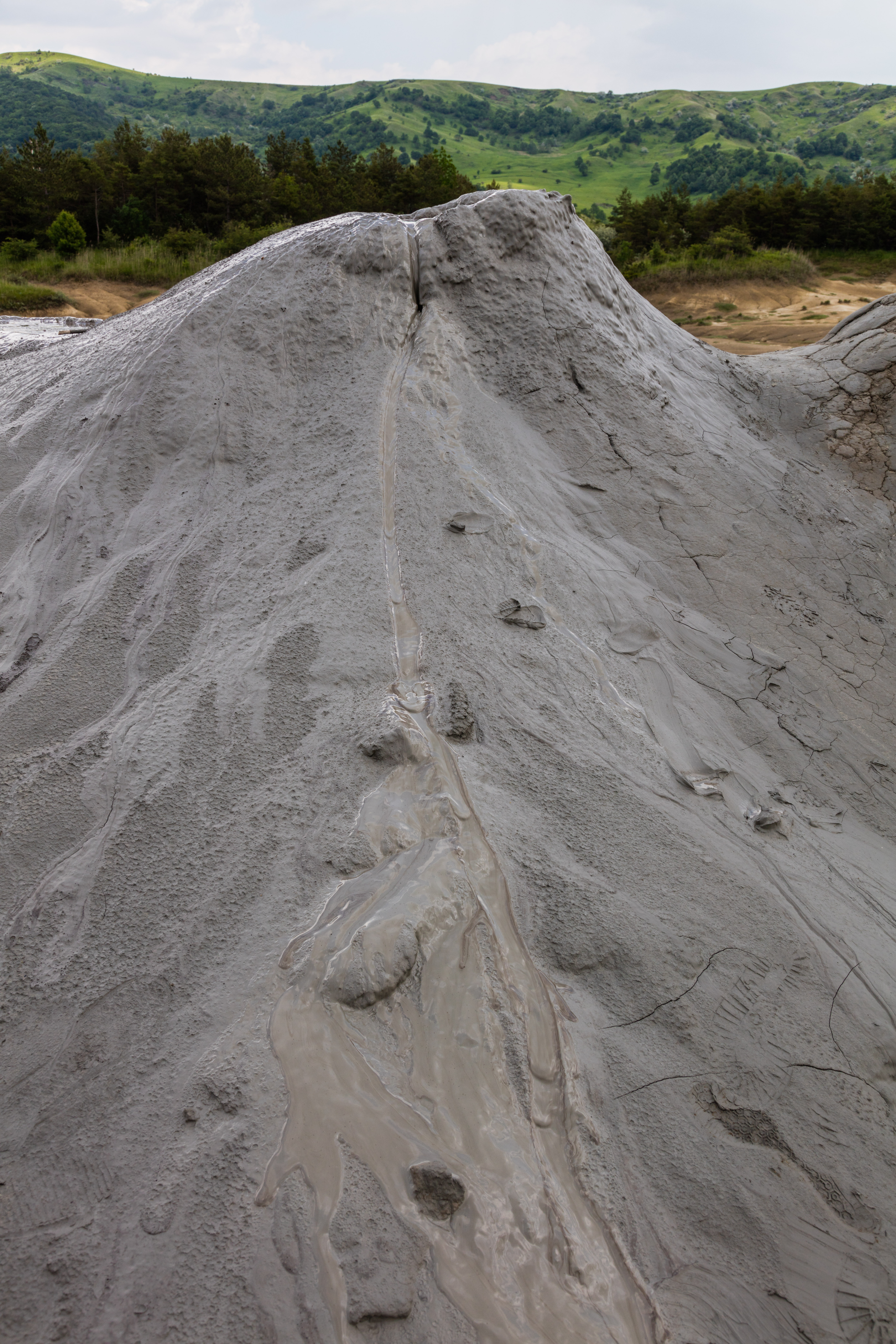
A small but active mud volcano

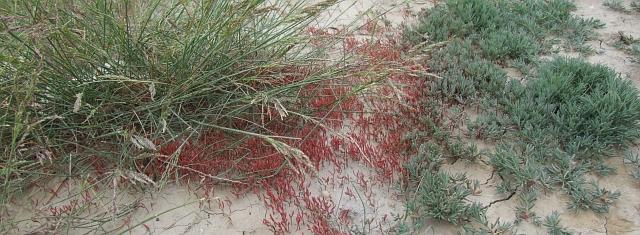
Vegetation at the base of the mud volcanoes

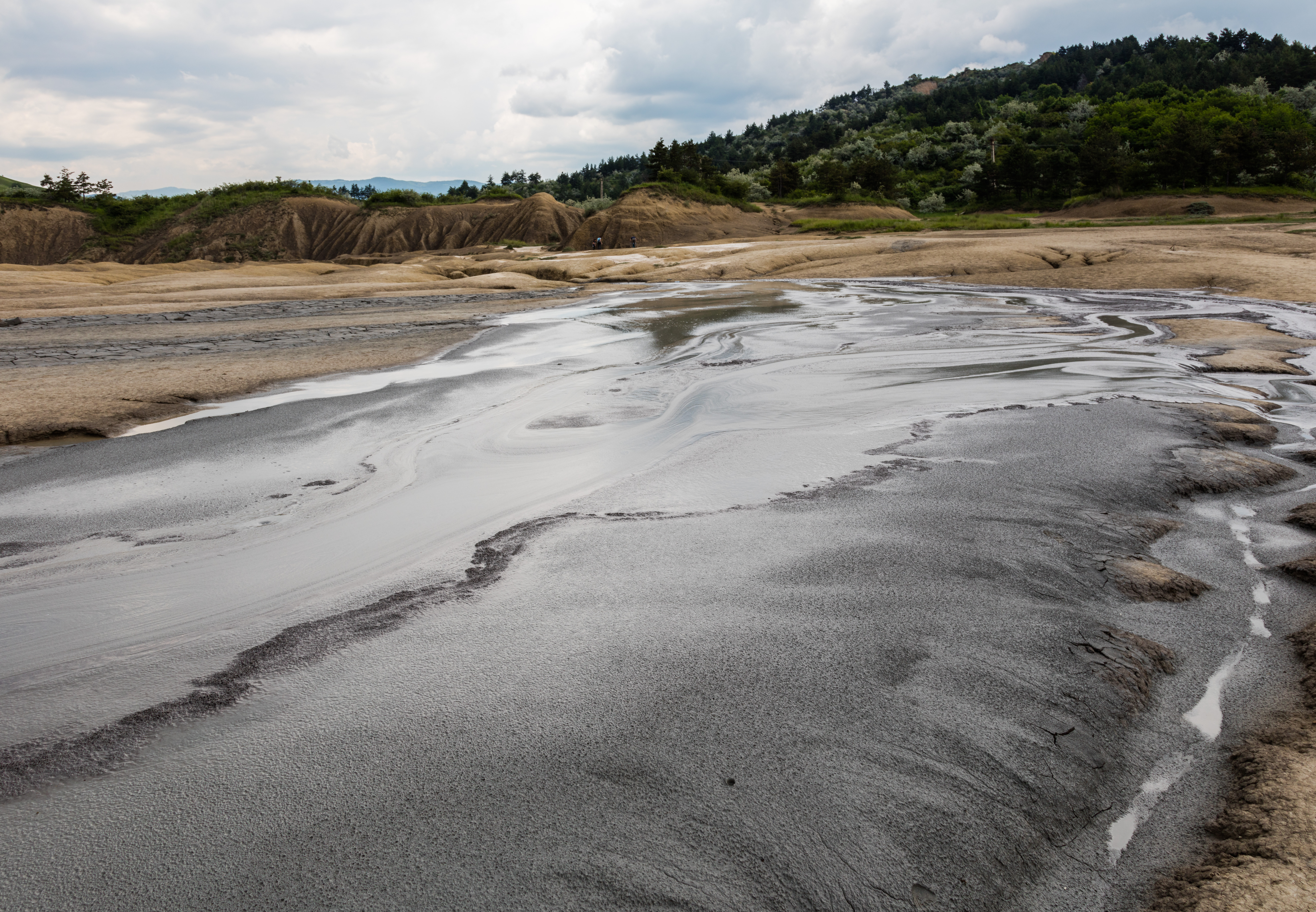
Flowing mud

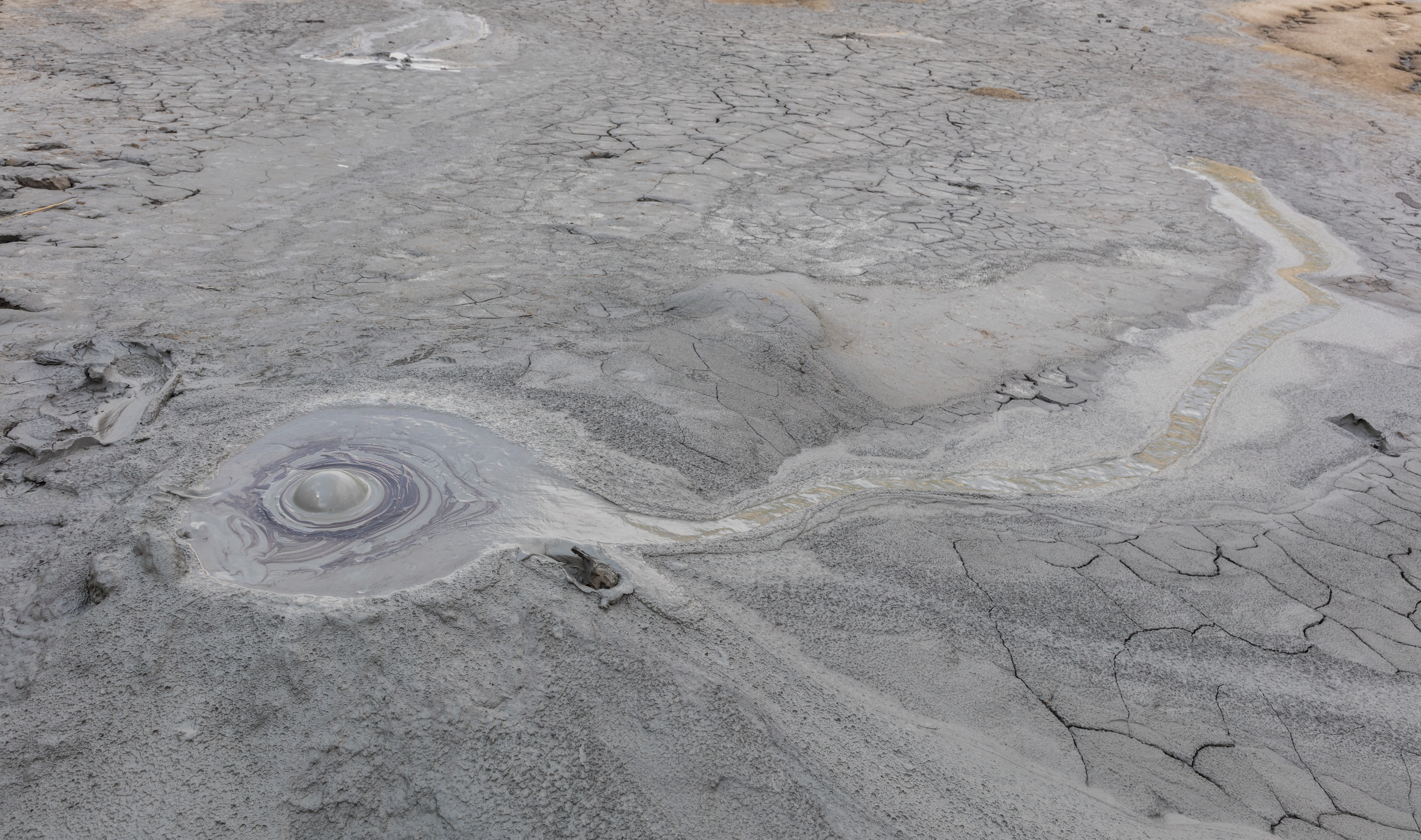
A bubble of gas bursting through the mouth of a Mud Volcano

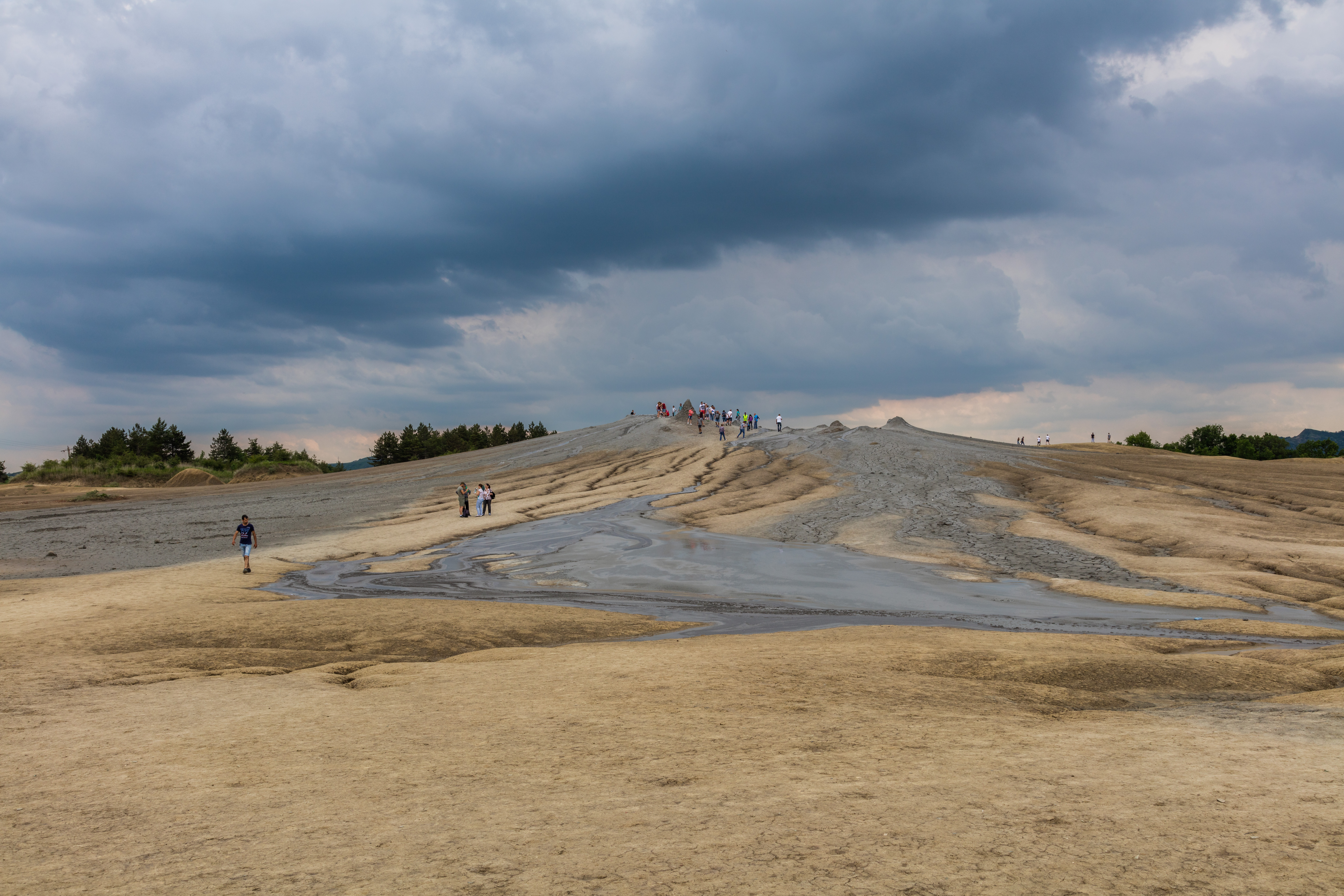
General view

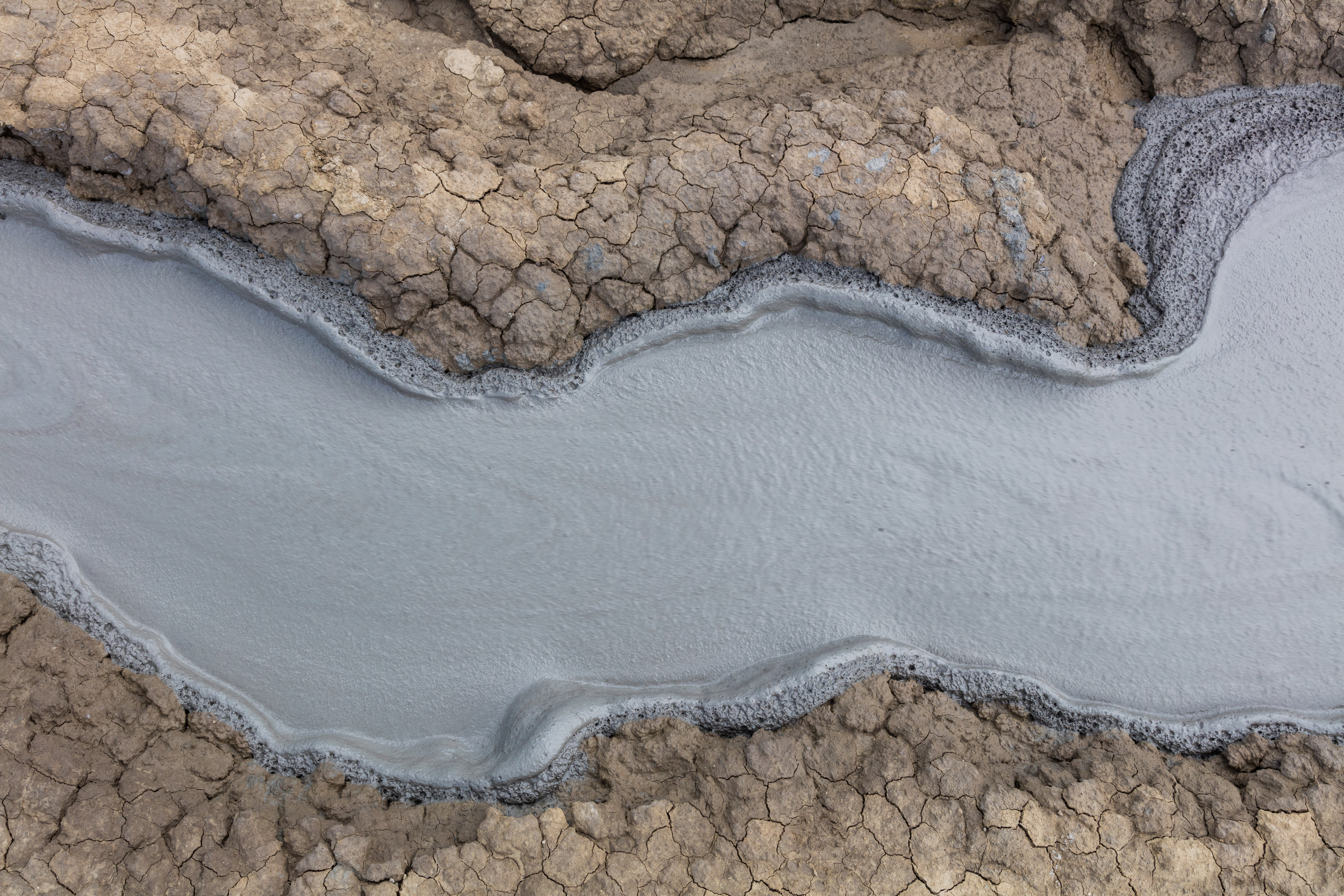
Channel of mud

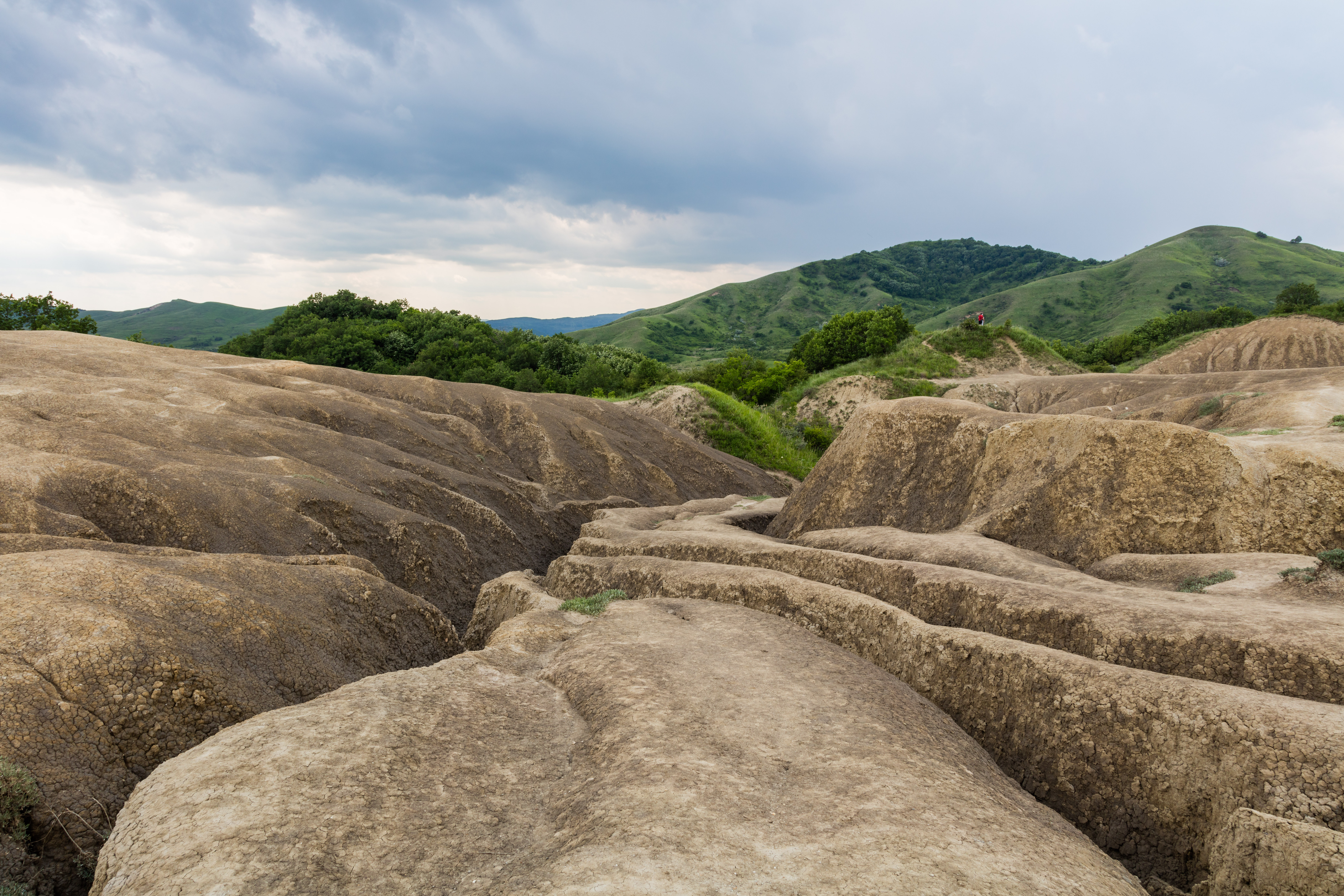
Landscape formed by the mud flows

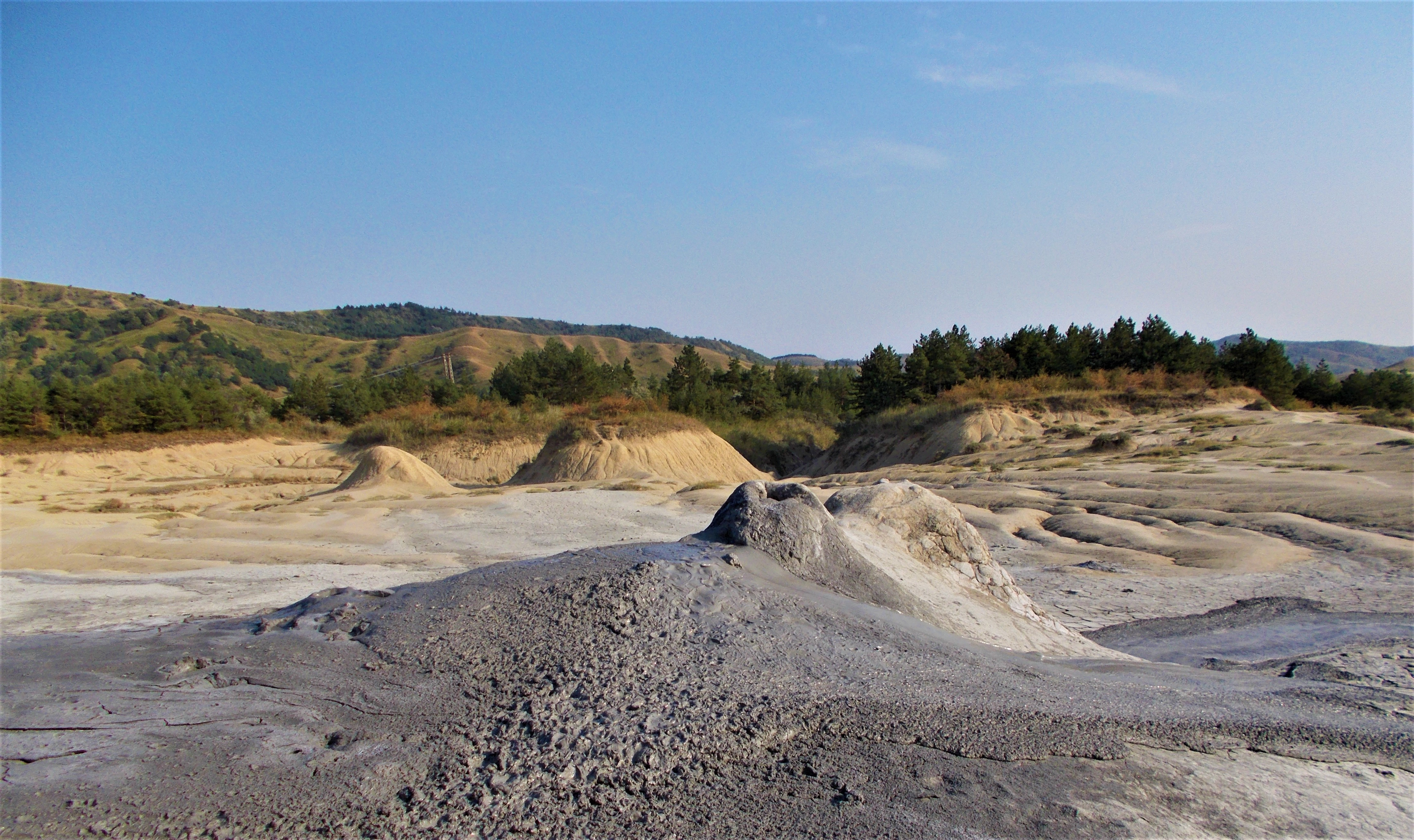
General view

== See also ==
- Tourism in Romania
