= Malacocarpus =

Scientific classification
- Kingdom: Plantae
- Clade: Embryophytes
- Clade: Tracheophytes
- Clade: Angiosperms
- Clade: Eudicots
- Clade: Rosids
- Order: Sapindales
- Family: Nitrariaceae
- Genus: Malacocarpus; Fisch. & C.A.Mey.
- Species: M. crithmifolius

Binomial name
- Malacocarpus crithmifolius (Retz.) Fisch. & C.A.Mey.

Synonyms
- Peganum crithmifolium Retz.; Peganum harmala var. crithmifolium (Retz.) DC.

Genus of flowering plants

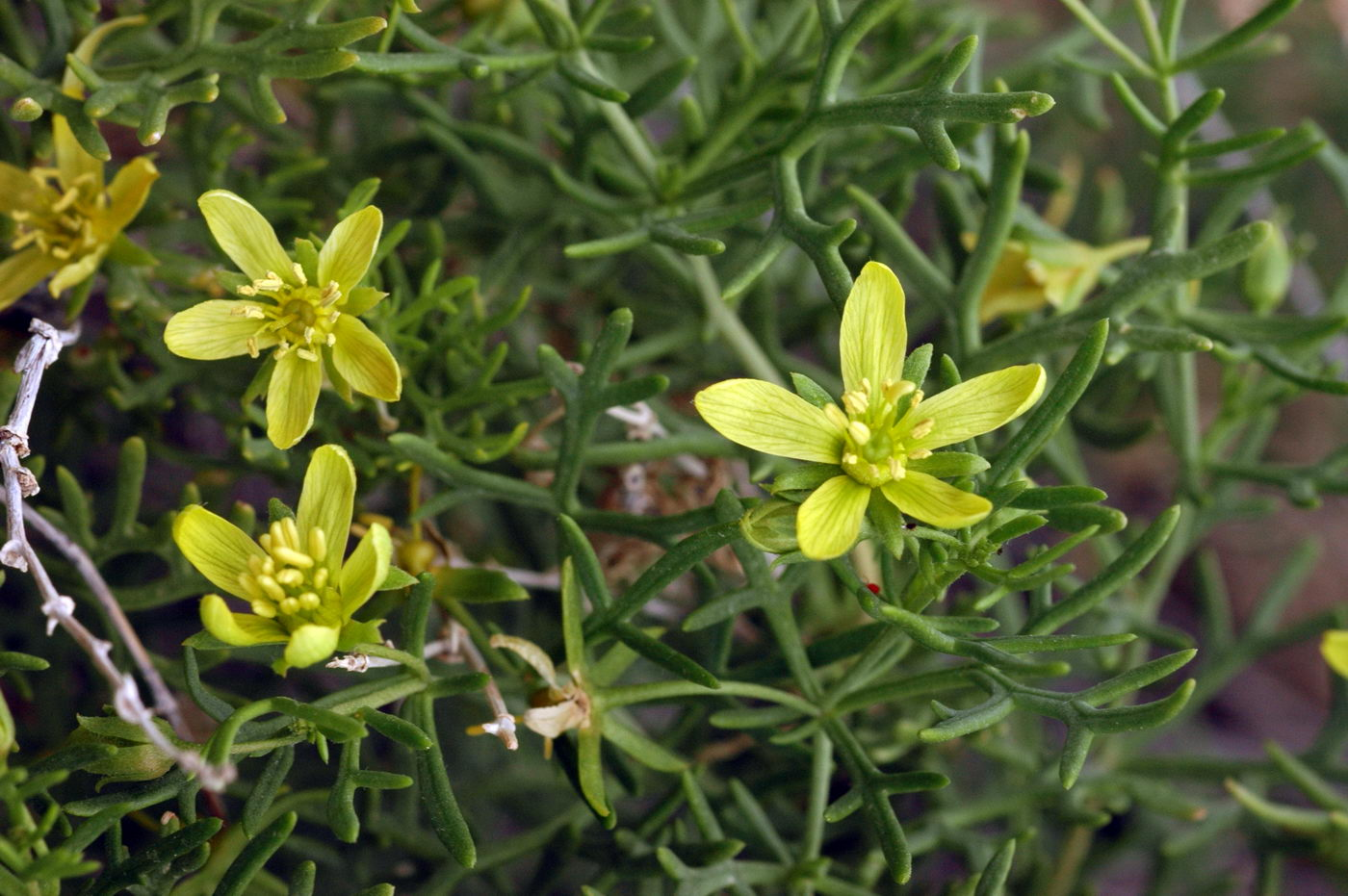
Malacocarpus crithmifolius

Malacocarpus is a genus of flowering plants in the family Nitrariaceae. It includes a single species, Malacocarpus crithmifolius, a subshrub or shrub native to Central Asia, Afghanistan, and northeastern Iran.
