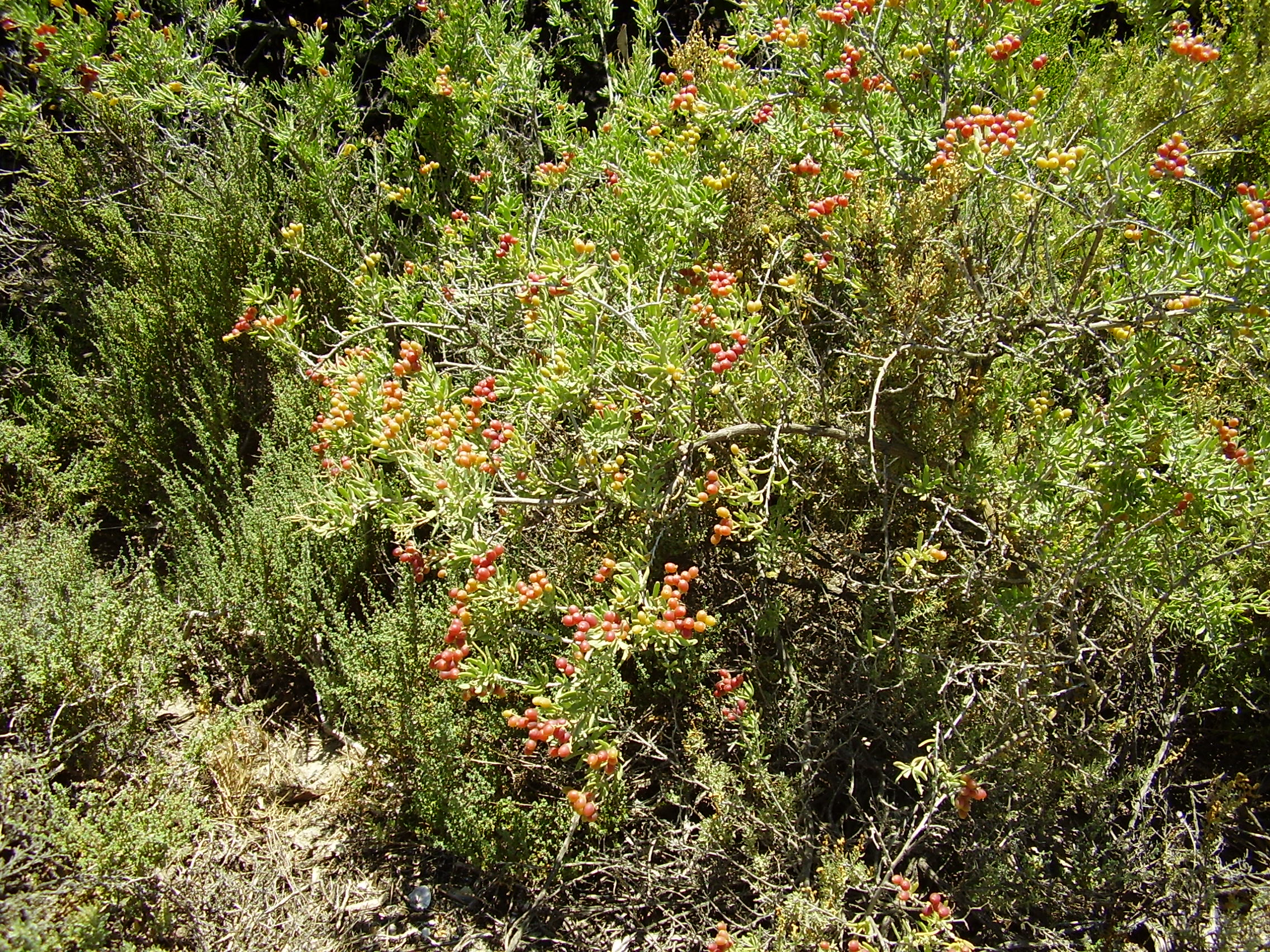
- Nitraria billardierei in St Kilda, South Australia.

Scientific classification
- Kingdom: Plantae
- Clade: Tracheophytes
- Clade: Angiosperms
- Clade: Eudicots
- Clade: Rosids
- Order: Sapindales
- Family: Nitrariaceae
- Genus: Nitraria; L.

Species
- See text

= Nitraria =

Genus of flowering plants

Nitraria, known as the nitre bushes, is a genus of flowering plants in the family Nitrariaceae, native to Africa, Europe, Asia, Russia and Australia.

There are about 9 species including:

- Nitraria billardierei DC., known as nitre bush or dillon bush
- Nitraria retusa (Forssk.) Asch.
- Nitraria schoberi L.
- Nitraria sibirica Pall.
