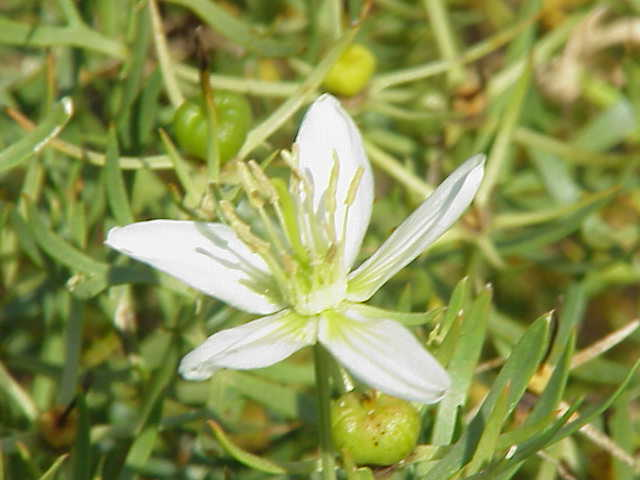
- Peganum harmala

Scientific classification
- Kingdom: Plantae
- Clade: Tracheophytes
- Clade: Angiosperms
- Clade: Eudicots
- Clade: Rosids
- Order: Sapindales
- Family: Nitrariaceae; Lindl.

Genera
- Malacocarpus Fisch. & C.A.Mey.; Nitraria L.; Peganum L.; Tetradiclis Steven ex M.Bieb.

= Nitrariaceae =

Family of flowering plants

Nitrariaceae is a family of flowering plants in the order Sapindales. It comprises four genera, Malacocarpus, Nitraria, Peganum and Tetradiclis, totalling 19 species.

The family's main range is in the arid and semi-arid regions from Central Asia west to North Africa and southern Europe, but there are also species in eastern Mexico and southern Australia.
