= Greenwich Hospital =

Greenwich Hospital may refer to:

- Greenwich Hospital, London, which was a home for retired Royal Navy sailors 1692–1869, operated by the Greenwich Hospital charitable foundation
- Greenwich District Hospital, a hospital in London from 1970 to 2001
- Trinity Hospital, a group of almshouses located east of Maritime Greenwich
- Memorial Hospital, Woolwich or Greenwich Memorial Hospital, a former general hospital now providing elderly and psychiatric care
- Miller General Hospital, situated in west Greenwich, London
- St Alfege's Hospital, situated in east Greenwich, London (later the site of Greenwich District Hospital)
- Greenwich Hospital (Connecticut), United States
- Greenwich Hospital, Sydney, Australia
