= Mary Broadfoot Walker =

British physician

Dr. Mary Broadfoot Walker
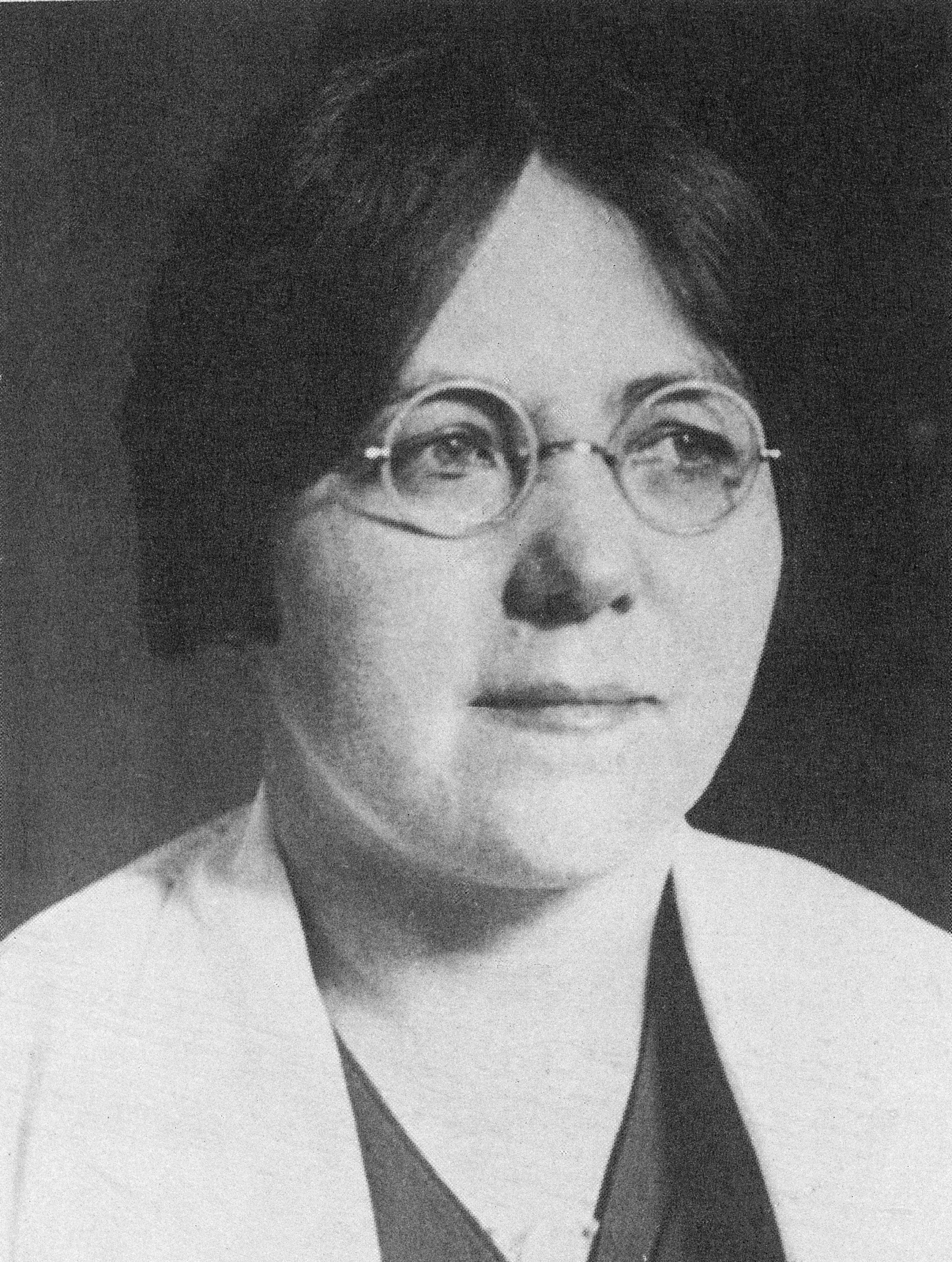
- Dr Mary Walker in the 1920s
- Born: 17 April 1888; Croft-an-Righ, Wigtown, Scotland
- Died: 13 September 1974 (aged 86)
- Education: University of Edinburgh; Edinburgh College of Medicine for Women
- Years active: 1913–1974
- Known for: Treatment of myasthenia gravis with physostigmine Association of familial periodic paralysis and hypokalaemia
- Medical career
- Profession: physician
- Institutions: St Alfege's Hospital, Greenwich; St Leonard's Hospital, Shoreditch; St Francis' Hospital, Dulwich; St Benedict's Hospital, Tooting; Glasgow Royal Maternity and Women's Hospital
- Research: Myasthenia gravis Familial periodic paralysis
- Awards: Royal College of Physicians Jean Hunter Prize (1962)

Mary Broadfoot Walker (17 April 1888 – 13 September 1974) was a Scottish physician who first demonstrated the effectiveness of physostigmine in the treatment of the condition myasthenia gravis, a disease relating to muscle weakness. She was also the first to recognise the association between familial periodic paralysis and low blood potassium levels.

== Early life and education ==
Mary Walker was born at Croft-an-Righ, Wigtown, Scotland in 1888. The eldest of four children, her father was a solicitor. After school, she trained in medicine at the Edinburgh College of Medicine for Women, and like most of the college's students, she received much of her clinical teaching in Glasgow. She graduated MB ChB from the University of Edinburgh in 1913.

== Career and research ==
During the First World War, she served with the Royal Army Medical Corps at the 63rd General Hospital, Malta. In 1920 she became a salaried Assistant Medical Officer in "Poor Law Service" at St Alfege's Hospital, Greenwich, London, where she worked until 1936. In 1932, she was awarded Membership of the Royal College of Physicians. She then worked at St Leonard's Hospital, Shoreditch, St. Francis' Hospital, Dulwich and St Benedict's Hospital, Tooting.

In 1934, while working at St Alfege's Hospital, Walker discovered that the subcutaneous injection of physostigmine could temporarily reverse the muscle weakness found in patients with myasthenia gravis. She had noted that the symptoms and signs of myasthenia were similar to those found in curare poisoning, and physostigmine was used as an antidote to curare poisoning at that time. The first case of myasthenia gravis successfully treated with physostigmine was published in the Lancet in June 1934.

In 1935, Walker was the first to recognise the association between the condition familial periodic paralysis and hypokalaemia (low blood potassium levels). She also described the glucose challenge test used in diagnosing hypokalaemic periodic paralysis and the use of intravenous potassium in its treatment. During 1935, her research on myasthenia was incorporated into her MD thesis which was submitted via the University of Edinburgh, and for which she received a gold medal.

After her retirement to Croft-an-Righ in 1954, she continued to work part-time at the Glasgow Royal Maternity and Women's Hospital, and remained active in the field of myasthenia gravis. (Note: Letter to Miss Sylvia Bates advocating controlled trial of thymectomy to ascertain its role in the management of myasthenia gravis)

Her 1973 article also describes the Mary Walker Effect, a clinical sign found in myasthenia gravis.

She died on 13 September 1974 at the age of 86.

== Awards and honours ==
In 1962, Walker was the first recipient of the Royal College of Physicians Jean Hunter Prize "for the advancement of research into the treatment of nervous exhaustion and for her original contribution to the fundamental knowledge of the nature of myasthenia gravis, made while carrying out the routine duties of a medical officer at a large metropolitan hospital".
