= St James' Hospital, Balham =

St James' Hospital
- Location within the Royal Borough of Wandsworth

Geography
- Location: Balham, London, England, United Kingdom
- Coordinates: 51.4423°N 0.1632°W

Organisation
- Care system: NHS England
- Type: District General

History
- Founded: 1910
- Closed: 1988

Links
- Lists: Hospitals in England

St James' Hospital was a healthcare facility in Balham, London that existed between 1910 and 1988. The hospital buildings occupied sites within the boundary of Ouseley Road, Sarsfield Road and St James's Drive (previously named St James's Road), Balham, London SW12.

== Early history as a workhouse ==
Rapid London population growth in the early 1890s had resulted in increased demand for poor relief, so the Wandsworth Union purchased the site of the St James's Road Industrial School for £21,000 from the Westminster Union. The School had been built around 1851 to house juvenile offenders. The existing buildings were converted and became known as the St James's Road branch of the Garratt Lane workhouse.

== St James’ Infirmary ==
In 1909 the Wandsworth Board of Guardians built St James' Infirmary in Sarsfeld Road, on what had once been the workhouse gardens.

It was officially opened in November 1910 by the Rt Hon John Burns (1858-1943), President of the Local Government Board, with the main ceremony taking place in an unfurnished ward. The buildings had cost £66,550 and could accommodate 606 patients. The central 2-storey administration block had a long corridor either side, linking it to the 3-storey ward blocks to the south (for men) and the north (for women). The old workhouse buildings which fronted onto St James's Road were also taken over by the Infirmary.

== First World War ==
During 1914-18 the Infirmary became an auxiliary military hospital to the First London (T.F.) General Hospital, which had been established in August 1914 at St Gabriel's College in Cormont Road, a large modern building built in 1900, overlooking Myatt's Fields, a municipal park. St James’ allocated 68 of its beds to wounded or sick servicemen.

There were four other auxiliary hospitals established at St Mark's College, Chelsea, Royal Victoria Patriotic School, Wandsworth, King's College Hospital, Denmark Hill and St Thomas' Hospital, Lambeth.

== Re-named St James’ Hospital ==
In 1922 its name was changed to St James' Hospital. By this time, it had 670 beds. In 1923 staff accommodation was improved with a new Nurses' Home that could accommodate 155 members of staff. In 1926 another block for the Nurses' Home was built at the southern part of the site.

In 1930 the LCC London County Council took control and it became a general hospital with 746 beds. At this time the Medical Superintendent was W. L. MacCormac MB CHB FRCS (Edin), the Steward was W. O. Ward and the Matron was Constance Elizabeth Todd. Between 1931 and 1936 the Hospital was greatly expanded; two new blocks containing six extra wards were added, giving a total of 898 beds. In 1935 new X-ray and Physiotherapy Departments were built and, in 1936, a further extension to the Nurses' Home provided lecture rooms for the Nurses Training School as well as accommodation for 44 nurses.

Nurses' badge

== Second World War ==
During the Second World War the Hospital suffered superficial damage from incendiary bombs - on one occasion over 200 fell on the site. In 1944 a flying bomb damaged three wards, the boiler house and laundry. A second flying bomb not long afterwards fell outside the gates and damaged the opposite side of the Hospital.

== Transferred to the NHS ==
In July 1948 the hospital became part of the National Health Service, within the administration of the South West Regional Hospital Board and Wandsworth Hospital Management Committee, with 610 beds, part of the South West Metropolitan Regional Hospital Board. By December 1948, the Hospital had increased to 628 beds.

In 1949 land had been acquired at the junction of St James's Drive (previously named St James's Road) and Sarsfield Road, and a new entrance for the Hospital had been made on St James's Drive. By the end of the same year it had 637 beds and, by the end of 1950, 642 beds.

In October 1951 it was decided to replace the workhouse buildings on St James's Drive with a new central complex containing an Out-Patients Department, Accident & Emergency and Admissions Departments on the west side (with kitchens and dining rooms above), X-ray and Physiotherapy Departments at the north, and a Nurses' Home at the south. The Hospital had not been originally designed for the treatment of out-patients, this department had been housed in a small obsolete building.

In 1952, the foundation stone for the new main building was laid by Frank H. Elliott, the Chairman of the South West Metropolitan Regional Hospital Board. Building works began, but little steel was available in the post-war years and the building had to be redesigned to reduce the amount of steel used. While this work was carried out, it was necessary to transfer some patients to the Grove Hospital and St Benedict's Hospital. Following the rebuilding, the Hospital had 1082 beds.

In 1974, following a major reorganisation of the NHS, it came under the control of the Wandsworth and East Merton District Health Authority, part of the South West Thames Regional Health Authority.

In 1980, the hospital services were transferred to St George's Hospital, Tooting. It finally closed in 1988 when the new St James Wing opened at the Tooting site.

The hospital buildings were demolished in 1992. The site has been redeveloped for housing.
