= C23H29N3O2 =

The molecular formula C_{23}H_{29}N_{3}O_{2} (molar mass: 379.495 g/mol) may refer to:

- Cymserine
- Oxypertine
- 1P-LSD
- 1P-MIPLA
