= Constance Todd =

Constance Todd may refer to:

- Constance Coltman (1889–1969), née Todd, one of the first women ordained to Christian ministry in Britain
- Constance Elizabeth Todd (1870–1960), British military nurse
