= Brook General Hospital =

- Greenwich Health Authority
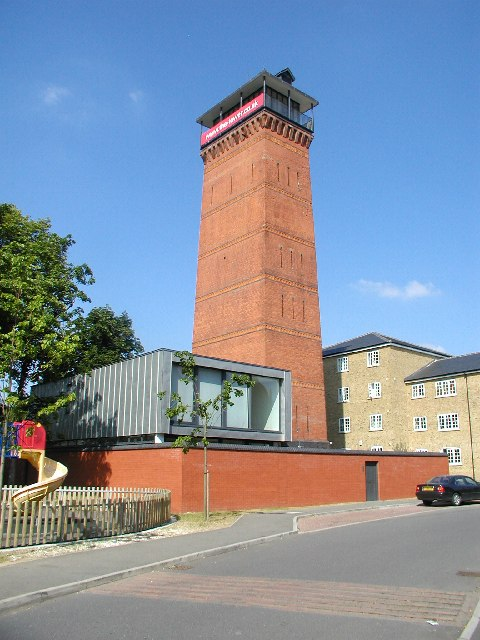
- The former hospital water tower

- Location within Greenwich

Geography
- Location: London, SE18; United Kingdom
- Coordinates: 51.4721°N 0.0476°E

Organisation
- Care system: NHS England
- Type: District General

Services
- Emergency department: Yes

History
- Founded: 1896
- Closed: 1996

The Brook General Hospital (originally, 1896–1948, the Brook Fever Hospital) was the westernmost of three hospitals simultaneously situated on Shooter's Hill in southeast London in the Royal Borough of Greenwich (the others were the Royal Herbert Hospital and the Memorial Hospital, Woolwich). It closed in 1996, and most of its buildings were subsequently demolished.

Badges awarded to nurses who trained at the hospital during LCC operation from 1930 to 1948

== History ==
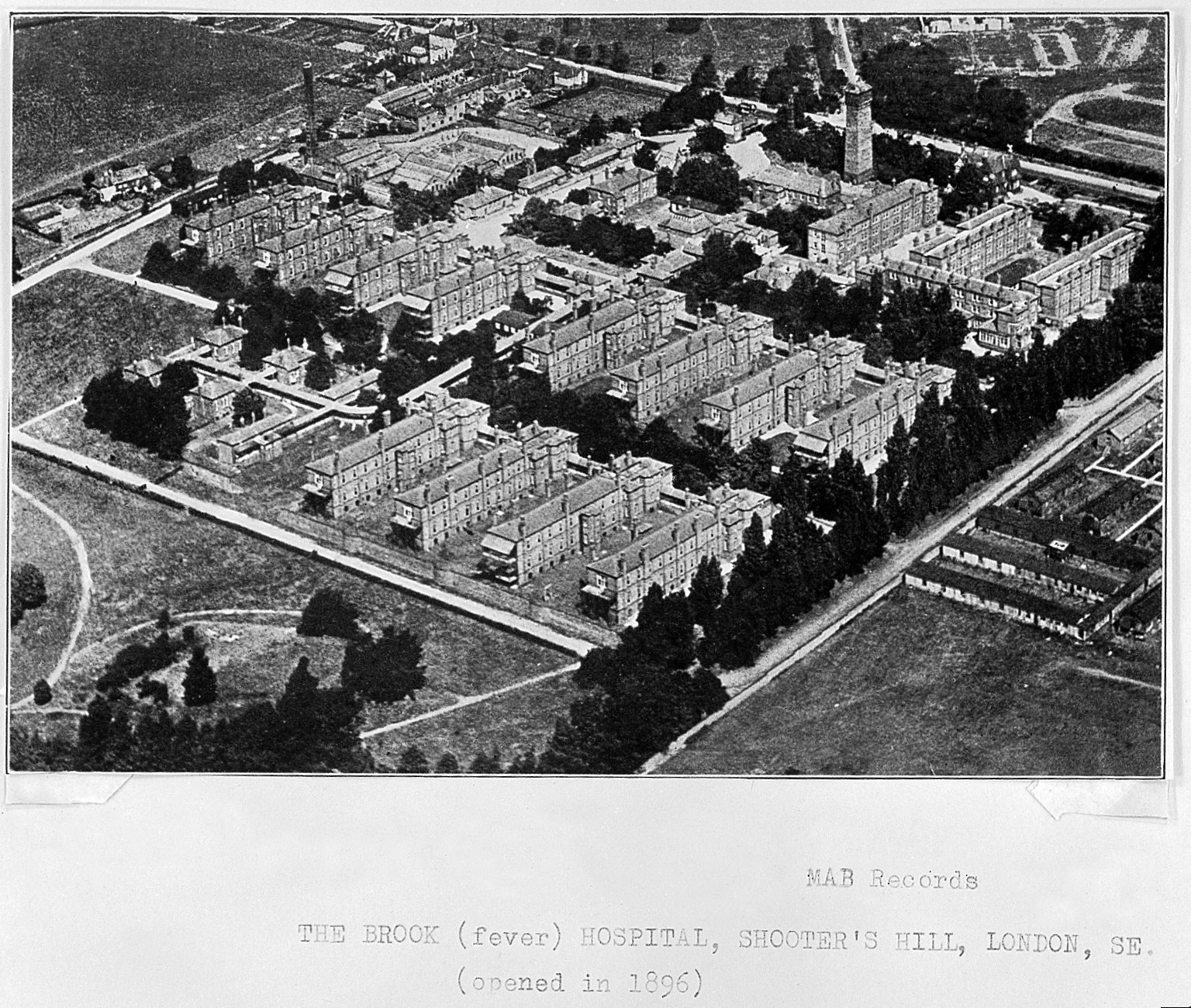
Aerial view, c. 1930.

Designed by architect Thomas Aldwinckle, the Brook Fever Hospital was one of five fever hospitals built during the 1890s by the Metropolitan Asylums Board. Its foundation stone was laid by Lady Galsworthy in July 1894, and the 488-bed hospital opened in 1896.

The hospital design separated infectious areas of the Hospital from the non-infectious, and had two entrances separated by a porter's lodge; the east entrance was for infectious patients, the west for non-infectious staff and visitors. Hospital wards were housed in a series of 2-storey pavilions built in terraces and connected by roofed walkways. There were 40 separate blocks covering 21 acres of the 29-acre site. The hospital mainly catered for patients with scarlet fever (352 beds), enteric fever and diphtheria (112 beds).

During World War I, the hospital was requisitioned by the War Office for the treatment of military casualties, opening in September 1915 as the Brook War Hospital, with 1000 beds. MAB nurses were replaced by nurses from the Queen Alexandra Imperial Military Nursing Service, and the War Hospital was equipped with two new operating theatres and an X-ray room. It ceased to be a War Hospital on 5 November 1919, having provided treatment for 414 officers and 30,080 other ranks during the war.

In 1930, with the dissolution of the MAB, the hospital came under London County Council control, providing 552 beds dealing with scarlet fever and measles. At this point the hospital had 552 beds and the senior staff were JB Byles MB, BC, FRCS, LBSP, DPH (medical director), Miss M E Quinlan ARRC (matron) and WH Mathews (steward).

In World War II, it joined the Emergency Medical Service, becoming a general hospital for service personnel and civilians, and providing treatment for the many air-raid casualties, including victims of a V-2 rocket which hit the nearby Brook Hotel on 11 November 1944.

In 1948, it became part of the National Health Service, and was jointly managed with the nearby Memorial Hospital; medical beds were transferred from the Memorial to the Brook, which was eventually renamed the Brook General Hospital. During the 1950s, it also contained a training school for nurses for the Hospital for Sick Children in Great Ormond Street. An Accident and Emergency Department opened in the 1960s, built at the north of the site (it was to this unit that murdered Stephen Lawrence was taken and pronounced dead in April 1993). In 1971, June Jolly established a new children's unit at the hospital, fitting the wards and nurses with colourful curtains and aprons, and setting up a "care-by-parent" unit that encouraged parental involvement.

In the mid-1990s, A&E services were transferred to the nearby military hospital (built in the 1970s on the site of the Shrapnel Barracks) – now the Queen Elizabeth Hospital, London (officially opened in March 2001) – and the Brook General Hospital closed.

Most of the hospital buildings were subsequently demolished and replaced by housing. The hospital's distinctive water tower remains a landmark, while the entrance lodge, administration block and steward's house have also been preserved. An ambulance station continues to operate from its site on Shooters Hill Road.
