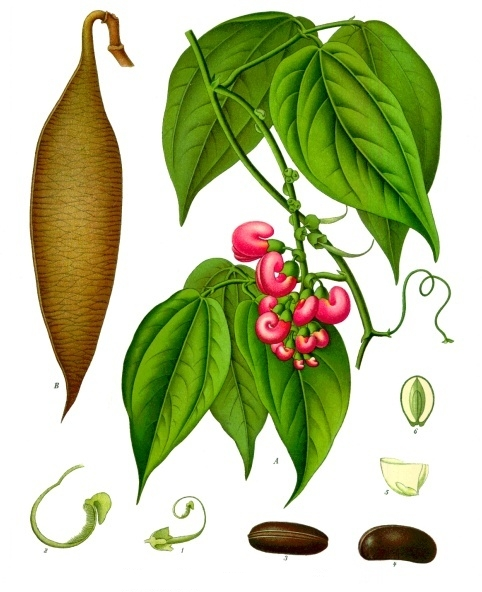
- Physostigma venenosum

Scientific classification
- Kingdom: Plantae
- Clade: Tracheophytes
- Clade: Angiosperms
- Clade: Eudicots
- Clade: Rosids
- Order: Fabales
- Family: Fabaceae
- Subfamily: Faboideae
- Clade: Millettioids
- Tribe: Phaseoleae
- Subtribe: Phaseolinae
- Genus: Physostigma; Balf. (1861)

Species
- 5; see text

= Physostigma =

Genus of plants

Physostigma is a genus of flowering plants in the family Fabaceae. It includes five species of erect or climbing herbs and subshrubs native to sub-Saharan Africa. They grow in tropical swamp and riverine vegetation and seasonally-dry forest, open woodland, and grassland in the Guineo-Congolian and Zambezian regions. The genus belongs to subfamily Faboideae.

Species in the genus include:

- Physostigma coriaceum Merxm.
- Physostigma cylindrospermum (Welw. ex Baker) Holmes
- Physostigma laxius Merxm.
- Physostigma mesoponticum Taub.
- Physostigma venenosum Balf.
