= Rosalind Wulzen =

American physiologist

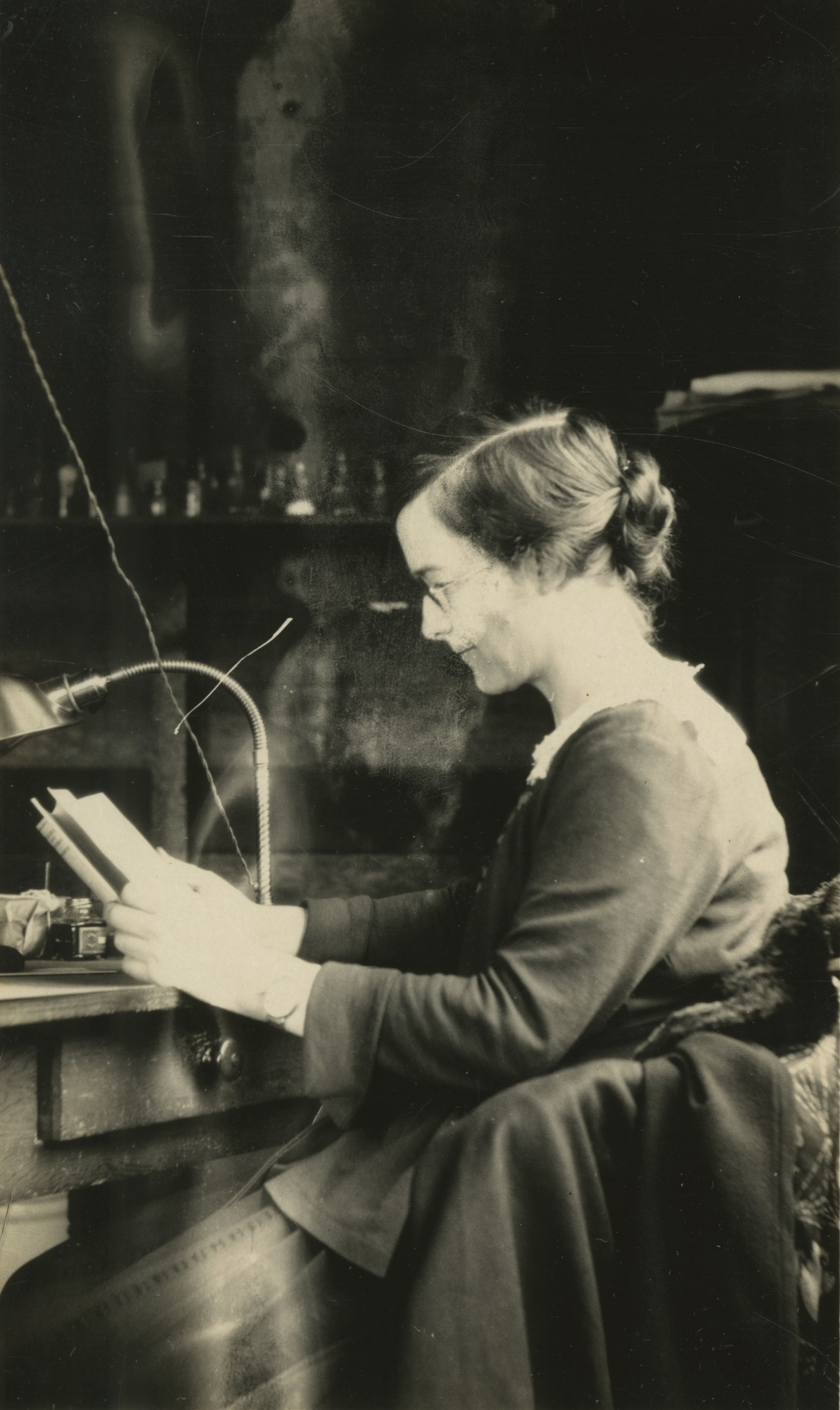
- Born: 1886; Oakland, California
- Died: Unknown
- Education: University of California, Berkeley
- Known for: Discovery of the "Anti-Stiffness Factor" that protects the joints of mammals from calcification
- Scientific career
- Fields: Physiology
- Doctoral advisor: Jacques Loeb

Rosalind Wulzen (b. 1882 or 1886) was an American physiologist, known for her discovery of stigmasterol, also called the "Anti-Stiffness Factor," or "Wulzen Factor."

== Early life and education ==
Rosalind Wulzen was born in Oakland, California.

Wulzen attended the University of California, Berkeley, graduating with degrees in Physiology and Anatomy (B.S. 1904; M.S. 1910; Ph.D. 1914). Her master's thesis was entitled, "On the mechanism of cytolysis in paramecium," and her doctoral thesis was entitled, "The pituitary gland in its relationship to the early period of growth in birds." Wulzen was the first woman to receive a Ph.D. in Physiology at Berkeley.

As a student, Wulzen was the Secretary and President of Sigma Xu, as well as the President of Phi Beta Kappa.

== Career and research ==
Between receiving her bachelor's degree and beginning her master's degree, Wulzen was a science teacher at Chino High School in California from 1904-1905 and at Martinez High School in California from 1905-1906. Then, while completing her doctoral degree, Wulzen was an Assistant Professor of Biology at Mills College from 1909-1914, teaching courses on Elementary Biology, Biology Laboratory, Bacteriology, Human Anatomy, Physiology, Physiology Laboratory, Advanced Physiology, and Microscopical Techniques.

Upon graduating with her Ph.D. in 1914, Wulzen became an Instructor in the Department of Physiology at the University of California, Berkeley. She was the first female faculty member in Physiology at the university. She remained a professor here for fourteen years, teaching courses such as Introductory Biology, Experimental Biology, and Physiology.

In 1927, Wulzen became an instructor and assistant professor in the Department of Animal Biology at the University of Oregon. Here, she continued her research on the pituitary gland and also began a notable career in the field of nutrition.

Wulzen took a full-time position as an assistant professor at Oregon State University in 1933. From 1941 to 1946, Wulzen was an associate professor, taking a full year sabbatical during her first year to focus her time on research. In 1946, she was appointed to the status of full Professor. Wulzen was an academic advisor to two students within the Departments of Zoology and Chemistry: Mary Lorene Wickert (M.S. 1944) and Virginia Lee Wiemar (M.S. 1947). She was Professor Emeritus from 1947 to 1980.

=== Scientific contributions ===
Wulzen is most known for her scientific discovery and exploration of the "Anti-Stiffness Factor," which she unearthed during her time at Oregon State University. This is a fat-soluble essential nutrient which regulates phosphorus metabolism and reverses symptoms of calcification.

== Publications ==
- "Nutritional Value for Planarian Worms of Vitamin Depleted Mammalian Tissues," Proceedings of the Society for Experimental Biology and Medicine (January 1936)
- "A Dietary Factor which Imparts to Certain Mammalian Tissues a Quality Necessary for the Correct Nutrition of Planarian Worms," Physiological Zoology (October 1935)
- "Variations in the Growth-Promoting Power of Kidney for Planarian Worms," Physiological Zoology (April 1932)
- "Unbalance in Planarian Nutrition," Physiological Zoology (April 1931)
- "The Growth-Promoting Power of Egg for Planarian Worms," Proceedings of the Society for Experimental Biology and Medicine (December 1929)
- "The Opposite Effects of Liver and Pancreas Upon the Growth of Planarian Worms," Cancer Research (March 1928)
- "The Nutrition of Planarian Worms," Science (April 1927)
- "Some Chemotropic and Feeding Reactions of Planaria Maculata," The Biological Bulletin (1917)
- "The Pituitary Gland. Its Effect on Growth and Fission of Planarian Worms," Journal of Biological Chemistry (July 1916)
- "The Morphology and Histology of a Certain Structure Connected with the Pars Intermedia of the Pituitary Body of the Ox," The Anatomical Record (Vol 8, No. 8, August 1914)
- "The Anterior Lobe of the Pituitary Body in its Relationship to the Early Growth Period of Birds," American Journal of Physiology (May 1914)

== Honors ==
Wulzen received an honorary Doctorate of Science from the University of Oregon in 1943.
