= Stigmasterol =

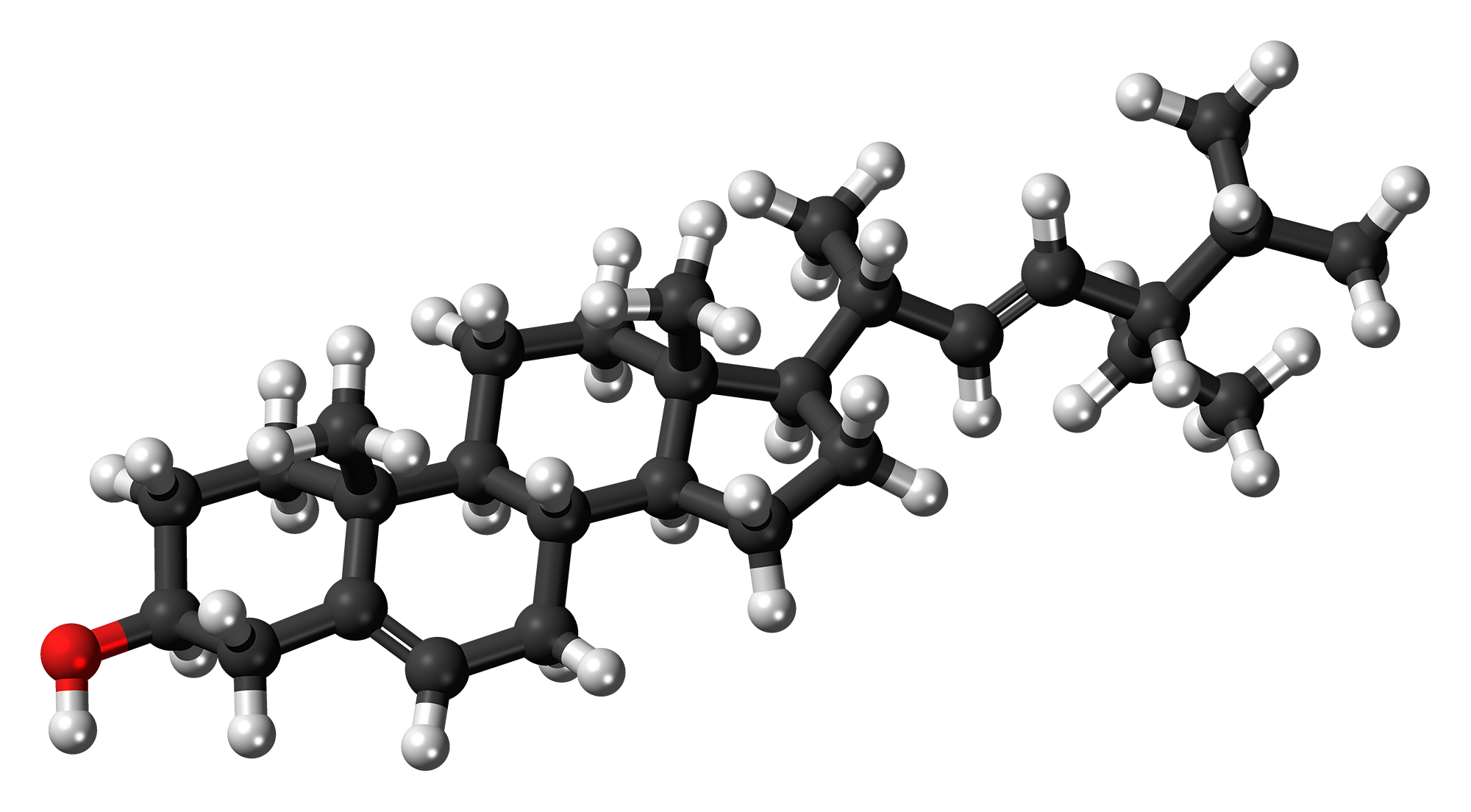

Names
- IUPAC name Stigmasta-5,22-dien-3β-ol
- Systematic IUPAC name (1R,3aS,3bS,7S,9aR,9bS,11aR)-1-[(2R,3E,5S)-5-Ethyl-6-methylhept-3-en-2-yl]-9a,11a-dimethyl-2,3,3a,3b,4,6,7,8,9,9a,9b,10,11,11a-tetradecahydro-1H-cyclopenta[a]phenanthren-7-ol
- Other names Stigmasterin; Wulzen anti-stiffness factor

Identifiers
CAS Number	83-48-7
3D model (JSmol)	Interactive image
ChEBI	CHEBI:28824
ChEMBL	ChEMBL400247
ChemSpider	4444352
ECHA InfoCard	100.001.348
PubChem CID	5280794
UNII	99WUK5D0Y8
CompTox Dashboard (EPA)	DTXSID801015733
- InChI: InChI=1S/C29H48O/c1-7-21(19(2)3)9-8-20(4)25-12-13-26-24-11-10-22-18-23(30)14-16-28(22,5)27(24)15-17-29(25,26)6/h8-10,19-21,23-27,30H,7,11-18H2,1-6H3/b9-8+/t20-,21-,23+,24+,25-,26+,27+,28+,29-/m1/s1 Key: HCXVJBMSMIARIN-PHZDYDNGSA-N; InChI=1/C29H48O/c1-7-21(19(2)3)9-8-20(4)25-12-13-26-24-11-10-22-18-23(30)14-16-28(22,5)27(24)15-17-29(25,26)6/h8-10,19-21,23-27,30H,7,11-18H2,1-6H3/b9-8+/t20-,21-,23+,24+,25-,26+,27+,28+,29-/m1/s1 Key: HCXVJBMSMIARIN-PHZDYDNGBL
- SMILES: CCC(C=CC(C)C1CCC2C1(CCC3C2CC=C4C3(CCC(C4)O)C)C)C(C)C

Properties
Chemical formula	C_{29}H_{48}O
Molar mass	412.702 g·mol^{−1}
Appearance	White solid
Melting point	160 to 164 °C (320 to 327 °F; 433 to 437 K)
Solubility in water	Insoluble
- Except where otherwise noted, data are given for materials in their standard state (at 25 °C [77 °F], 100 kPa). verify (what is ?) Infobox references

Stigmasterol – a plant sterol (phytosterol) – is among the most abundant of plant sterols, having a major function to maintain the structure and physiology of cell membranes. In the European Union, it is a food additive listed with E number E499, and may be used in food manufacturing to increase the phytosterol content, potentially lowering the levels of LDL cholesterol.

== Discovery ==
Once called Wulzen factor in the mid-20th century, stigmasterol was discovered by the University of California physiologist Rosalind Wulzen (born 1886).

== Natural occurrences ==
Stigmasterol is an unsaturated phytosterol occurring in the plant fats or oils of numerous plants, such as soybean, calabar bean, and rape seed, and in herbs used in herbalism practices, including the Chinese herbs Ophiopogon japonicus (Mai men dong), in Mirabilis jalapa.

Stigmasterol is a constituent of various vegetables, legumes, nuts, seeds, and unpasteurized milk. Pasteurization will inactivate stigmasterol. Edible oils contains higher amount than vegetables.

== Uses ==
Stigmasterol is a food additive in manufactured food products in the United Kingdom and European Union.

It was introduced as a precursor by Percy Lavon Julian for industrial large-scale manufacture of semisynthetic progesterone, a valuable human hormone that plays an important physiological role in the regulatory and tissue rebuilding mechanisms related to estrogen effects, as well as acting as an intermediate in the biosynthesis of androgens, estrogens, and corticoids. It is also used as the precursor of vitamin D_{3}.

The Upjohn company used stigmasterol as the starting raw material for commercial synthesis of cortisone in 1959.

== Research ==
As one of the major phytosterols, stigmasterol is included among sterol compounds in the diet having potential to reduce the risk of cardiovascular diseases. Consumption of 2 grams per day of plant sterols is associated with a reduction in blood LDL cholesterol of 8–10%, possibly lowering cardiovascular disease risk. As a factor in cellular processes of plants, stigmasterol may have roles in plant stress responses, metabolism, and enzymes involved in biosynthesis of plant cell membranes. Stigmasterol has also been shown to exert anti-angiogenic and anti-cancer effects via the downregulation of TNF-alpha and VEGFR-2.

== Potential precursor of boldenone ==
Being a steroid, stigmasterol is precursor of anabolic steroid boldenone. Boldenone undecylenate is commonly used in veterinary medicine to induce growth in cattle, but it is also one of the most commonly abused anabolic steroids in sports. This led to suspicion that some athletes testing positive for boldenone didn't consume the steroid itself, but rather consumed foods rich in stigmasterol. This turned out not to be the case, as humans do not appear to convert stigmasterol from food into boldenone. Calves have been reported to convert photosterol into boldenone, but even then the amounts in urine are below doping limits.

== See also ==
- Charantin, a stigmasteryl glucoside found in the bitter melon plant.
- Stigmastanol, a closely related phytosterol
- Sitosterol, a commonly occurring phytosterol
