= June Jolly =

English paediatric nurse and social worker

June Jolly with patients and a lion cub at Brook General Hospital

June Jolly (28 September 1928 – 12 March 2016) was an English paediatric nurse and social worker who in the 1970s–80s transformed the care provided in British children's hospitals to a "family-centred" model.

== Biography ==
June Jolly was born on 28 September 1928 in Hove to Arthur Jolly, a chartered accountant, and Flora Leaver, a Girl Guides commissioner. When she was 12 years old, June and two younger siblings were evacuated during the Second World War to Windsor, Ontario, in Canada. All three children were placed with different foster families; June's foster father was a paediatrician, who inspired her to work in medicine. She returned to England at the end of the war and went on to complete a degree in social science at the University of Southampton in 1950. After a one-year course in childcare at the London School of Economics, she worked in Kent for eleven years as a social worker in the field of child protection.

In 1963, Jolly qualified as a nurse through a newly established graduate programme at the Florence Nightingale Faculty of Nursing and Midwifery of St Thomas' Hospital in London. She was disappointed by the standards of emotional care for hospitalised children, and especially the reluctance to allow parents greater involvement in their children's care. She was promoted to sister-in-charge of the paediatric ward at St Thomas' Hospital and also worked at St Christopher's Hospice in pain and terminal care. In 1971, she was invited to establish a children's unit at the Brook General Hospital in Woolwich. There, she fitted the wards and nurses with colourful curtains and aprons, and set up a "care-by-parent" unit that encouraged parental involvement. On special occasions, she arranged fireworks and a visit to the ward by a circus elephant and lion cub.

Jolly received a scholarship from the Nightingale and Rayne Foundation to travel to North America and Jamaica to study different models of paediatric healthcare. She published a book based on her observations, The Other Side of Paediatrics: a guide to the everyday care of sick children, in 1980, which promoted a "family-centred" model of nursing and was released internationally. She died on 12 March 2016, aged 87.
