= Robert Palmer Browne =

British architect (1803–1872)

Robert Palmer Browne (30 January 1803 – 18 December 1872) was a British architect who was closely associated with the General Steam Navigation Company in the mid-nineteenth century but who also designed residential, church and public buildings, some of which are now listed by Historic England.

== Early life ==
Robert Browne was born in 1803 to Robert and Winfield Browne.

== Career ==
He was the architect and surveyor to the General Steam Navigation Company of London. He was responsible for a number of the firm's works at Coldharbour in London after they bought land and leases there from 1842. These included two piers in front of the pre-existing Brown's Wharf and Stewart's Wharf, and a new wharf at London Bridge in the 1860s.

In 1860 he was practising from 15 Royal Place, Royal Hill, Greenwich.

== Death ==
Browne died at Royal Place, Greenwich, on 18 December 1872. His executor was his brother George Henry Browne, gentleman. He left an estate of under £8,000.

== Notable works ==
- Woolwich Road Workhouse and Vanburgh Hill Infirmary, East Greenwich. (1839)
- St Mary Magdalene Church, St Marys Road, Peckham, London. (1839–41)
- 1 to 31 Westbourne Terrace, London. Grade II listed. (by 1849)
- Petham House, Kent, for Thomas Henry Mackay. (c.1850)
