= Eseroline =

Opioid analgesic compound

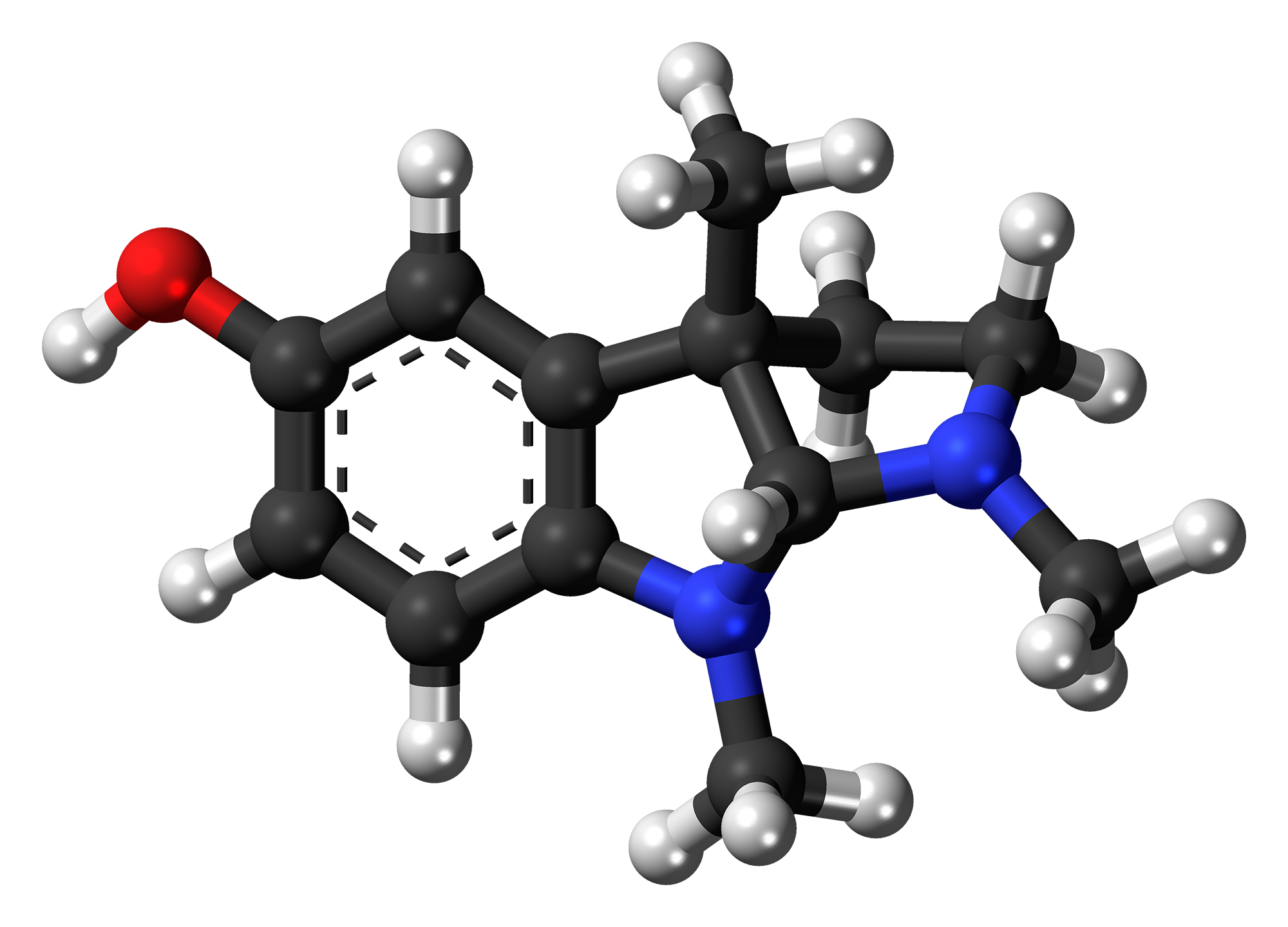

Clinical data
- Other names: Eseroline
- ATC code: none

Identifiers
- IUPAC name: (3aR,8bS)-3,4,8b-trimethyl-2,3a-dihydro-1H-pyrrolo[2,3-b]indol-7-ol
- CAS Number: 469-22-7
- PubChem CID: 119198
- ChemSpider: 106485
- UNII: Q22H41O18D
- ChEBI: CHEBI:48845
- CompTox Dashboard (EPA): DTXSID30891448

Chemical and physical data
- Formula: C_{13}H_{18}N_{2}O
- Molar mass: 218.300 g·mol^{−1}
- 3D model (JSmol): Interactive image
- SMILES: C[C@@]12CCN([C@@H]1N(C3=C2C=C(C=C3)O)C)C
- InChI: InChI=1S/C13H18N2O/c1-13-6-7-14(2)12(13)15(3)11-5-4-9(16)8-10(11)13/h4-5,8,12,16H,6-7H2,1-3H3/t12-,13+/m1/s1; Key:HKGWQUVGHPDEBZ-OLZOCXBDSA-N

Eseroline is a drug which acts as an opioid agonist. It is a metabolite of the acetylcholinesterase inhibitor physostigmine but unlike physostigmine, the acetylcholinesterase inhibition produced by eseroline is weak and easily reversible, and it produces fairly potent analgesic effects mediated through the μ-opioid receptor. This mixture of activities gives eseroline an unusual pharmacological profile, although its uses are limited by side effects such as respiratory depression and neurotoxicity.

== Synthesis ==
The alkylation of phenacetin (1) with dimethyl sulfate gives N-methylphenetidine (2). Treatment with 2-bromopropanoyl bromide gives 2-bromo-N-(4-ethoxyphenyl)-N-methylpropanamide (3). Treatment with aluminium trichloride results in 1,3-dimethyl-5-hydroxyoxindole (4). Alkylation with diethyl sulfate gives 5-ethoxy-1,3-dimethylindolin-2-one (5). Base-catalyzed treatment with chloroacetonitrile gives 2-(5-ethoxy-1,3-dimethyl-2-oxoindol-3-yl)acetonitrile (6). Catalytic hydrogenation of the nitrile group gives (7). Mono-methylation of the primary amine gives (8). Intramolecular reductive amination gives eserethole (9). Cleavage of the ethyl ether protecting group gave (-)-eseroline (10). Optional treatment with methyl isocyanide (MIC) leads to physostigmine.

Eseroline synthesis:
