= Queen Elizabeth Hospital, London =

Queen Elizabeth Hospital
- Lewisham and Greenwich NHS Trust
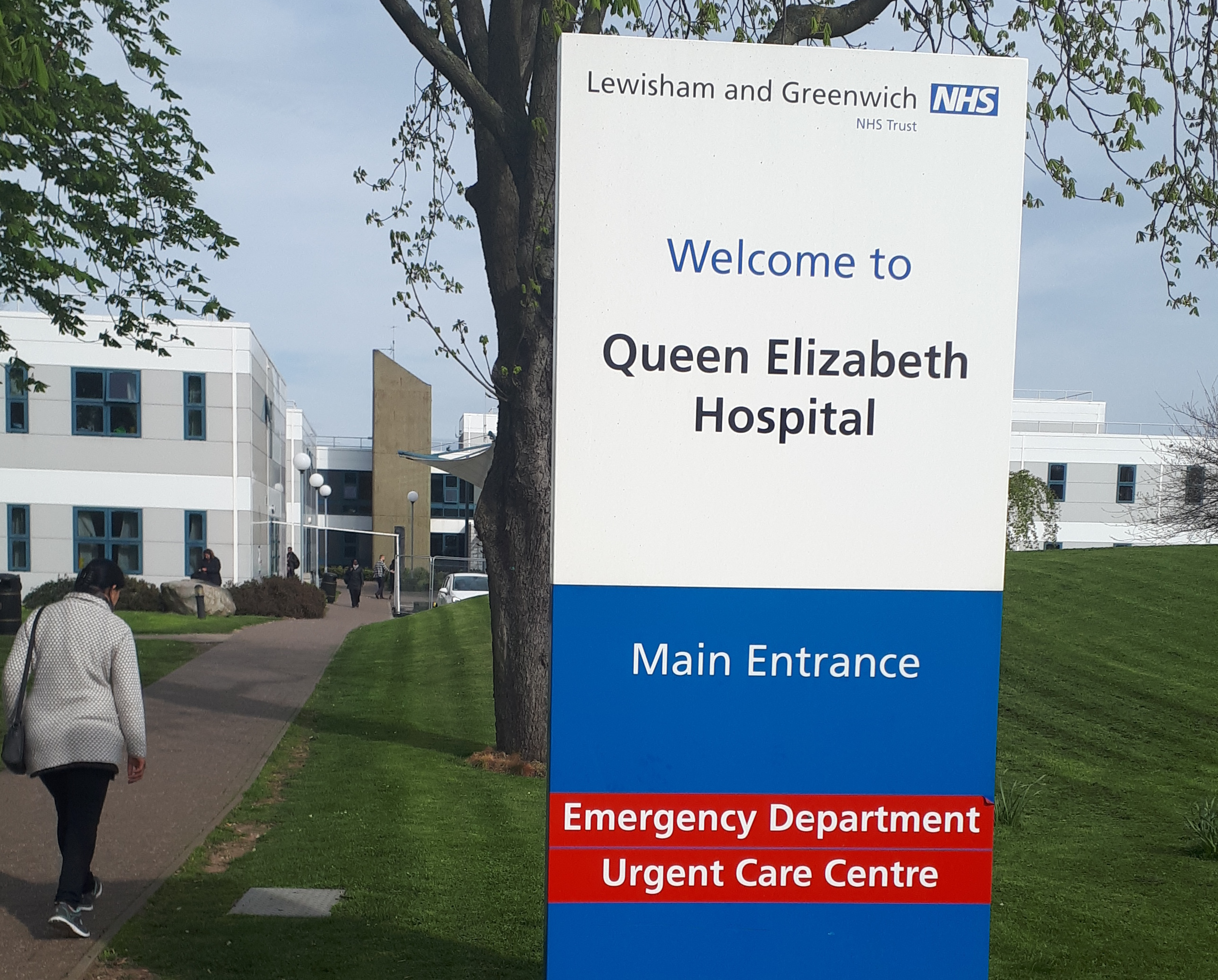
- Sign at main entrance Queen Elizabeth Hospital

- Location within the Royal Borough of Greenwich

Geography
- Location: Stadium Road, Woolwich, London, England
- Coordinates: 51.4789°N 0.0511°E

Organisation
- Care system: National Health Service
- Type: General

Services
- Emergency department: Yes
- Beds: 521

History
- Founded: March 2001; 25 years ago

Links
- Website: www.lewishamandgreenwich.nhs.uk

Queen Elizabeth Hospital is a hospital in Woolwich in the Royal Borough of Greenwich. It was opened in March 2001 and serves patients from the Royal Borough of Greenwich and the London Borough of Bexley. The hospital was built to accommodate the services previously provided at Greenwich District Hospital and Brook General Hospital, and is a Private Finance Initiative hospital. It is managed by the Lewisham and Greenwich NHS Trust.

== History ==
The hospital's name originates from the Queen Elizabeth Military Hospital, which occupied the site from 1977 until its closure in 1995, and was named after Queen Elizabeth The Queen Mother (who opened the hospital on 1 November 1978). The military hospital was built on the site of the former Shrapnel Barracks and was a replacement for the Royal Herbert Hospital in Shooters Hill and Queen Alexandra Military Hospital.

A new hospital was procured under a Private Finance Initiative contract to replace the military hospital and to accommodate services previously provided at Greenwich District Hospital and Brook General Hospital in 1998. The new hospital was built by Skanska at a cost of £84 million and opened in March 2001, being officially opened by the Queen on 11 December that year.

In July 2012, Andrew Lansley, Secretary of State for Health, announced that the South London Healthcare Trust, formed in 2009 was to go into special measures and become the first Trust to have an independent Administrator appointed. The Trust was subsequently disbanded by Jeremy Hunt, Lansley's successor as Secretary of State for Health.

On 1 October 2013 it was transferred to Lewisham and Greenwich NHS Trust on the disestablishment of South London Healthcare NHS Trust.

Following power cuts, water shortages and floods the trust applied to the Independent Trust Finance Facility, part of the Department of Health, for £48 million to repair the hospital in June 2016. It stated that "The infrastructure issues arise from unresolved legacy problems with the 60 year PFI agreement between the Meridian Hospital Company and the now dissolved Greenwich Health Authority, and derive from failures in specification and design standards, cost cutting at construction and contract terms that give the present trust limited redress against defects arising from the initial design and installation." The application was approved in November 2017.

In April 2018, following the January 2018 liquidation of Carillion, renewed concern about privatised provision of services at Lewisham and Greenwich NHS Trust prompted a petition, supported by the trade union GMB and local MP Matthew Pennycook, to bring 'soft' facilities services back in-house.

In February 2023, Lewisham and Greenwich NHS Trust appointed a contractor to undertake a £30m, 80-week programme of infrastructure works including installation of new primary high-voltage and low-voltage electricity distribution, back-up generators, a refurbished energy centre, and ventilation improvements including replacement of air handling units serving the operating theatres, pathology, delivery suite, special care baby unit and ward areas.

== Criticisms ==
In February 2017, the South London Critical Care Network reviewed the hospital's intensive care department and found a complete lack of medical leadership. Care for patients across the trust could be affected because of issues with the critical care service. It was suggested that "younger fitter patients with single organ failure" would not be admitted to intensive care until they developed multi-organ failure because of pressures on bed availability. Only 3.5 full-time equivalent consultants were in post, with staff working locum shifts to fill gaps. "There was no ownership of the care of deteriorating patients in the wider hospital." Ear nose and throat surgeons in Lewisham would not go to Woolwich, so patients needing tracheostomy had to be sent to Lewisham for their operation.

== Gallery ==
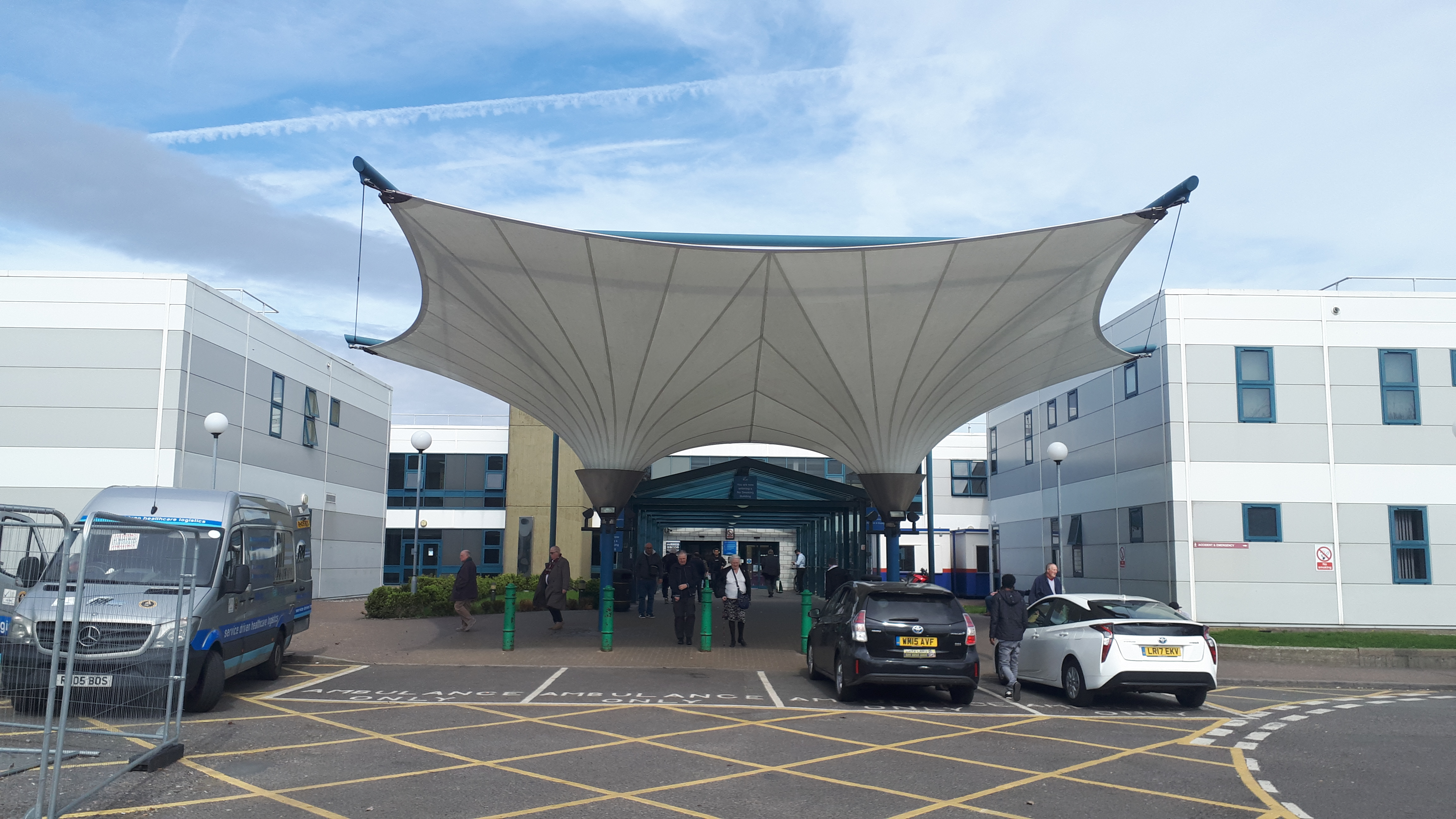
Main entrance

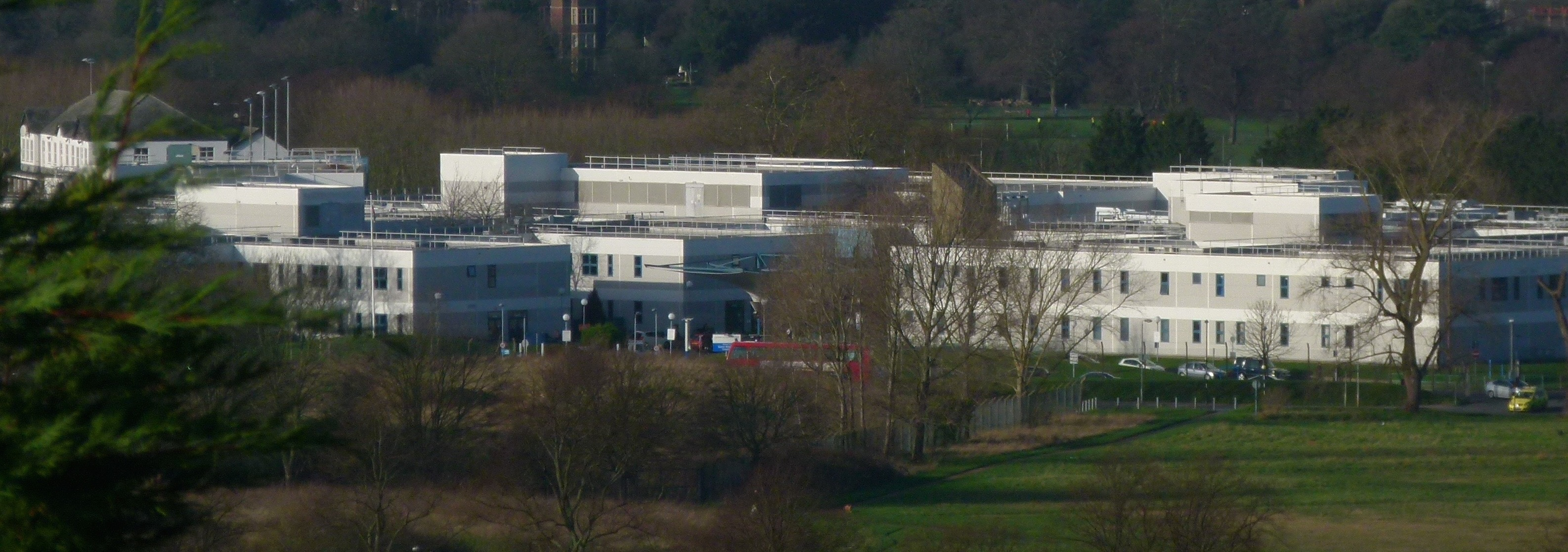
Hospital pavilions

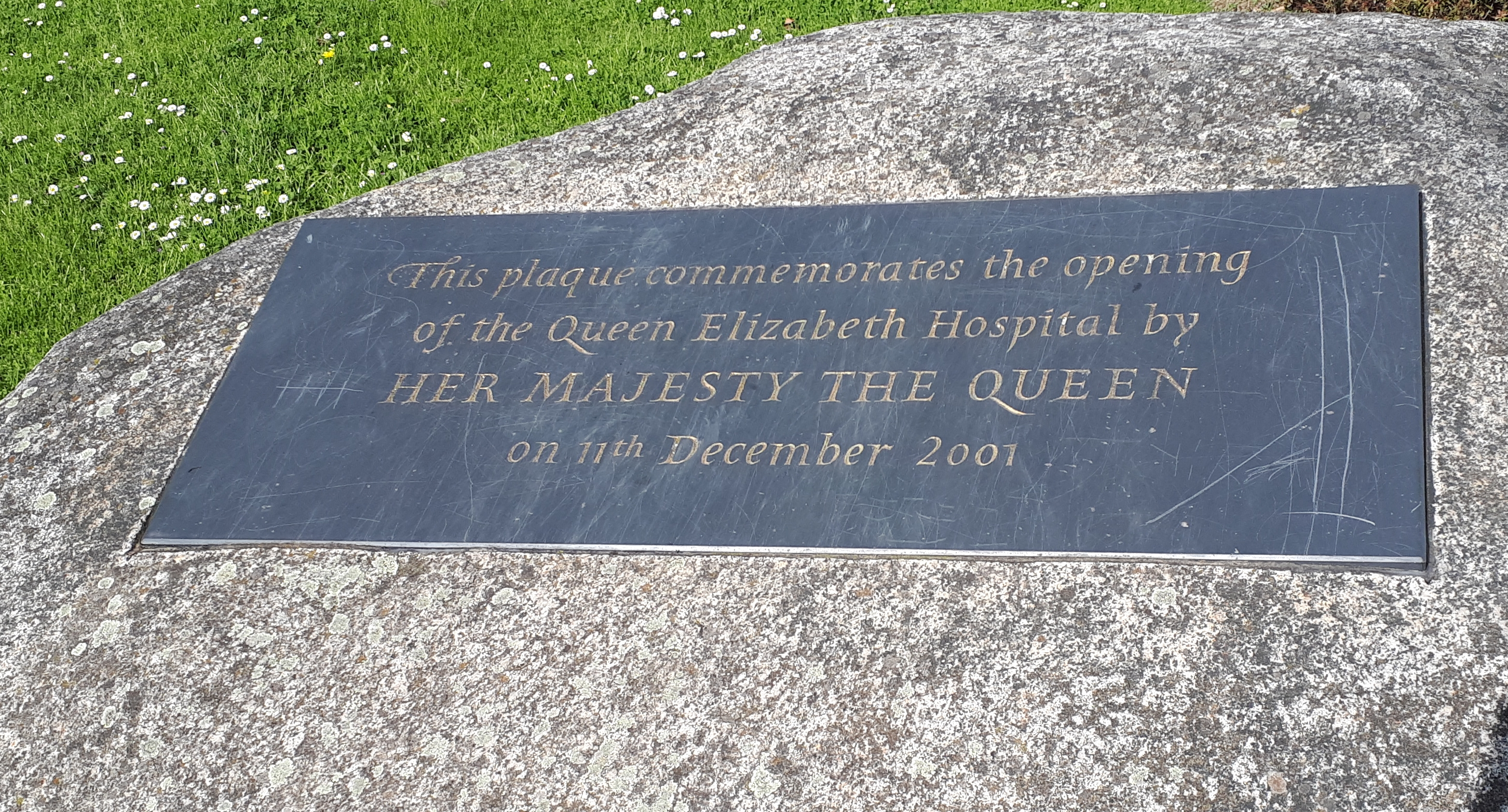
Hospital official opening plaque

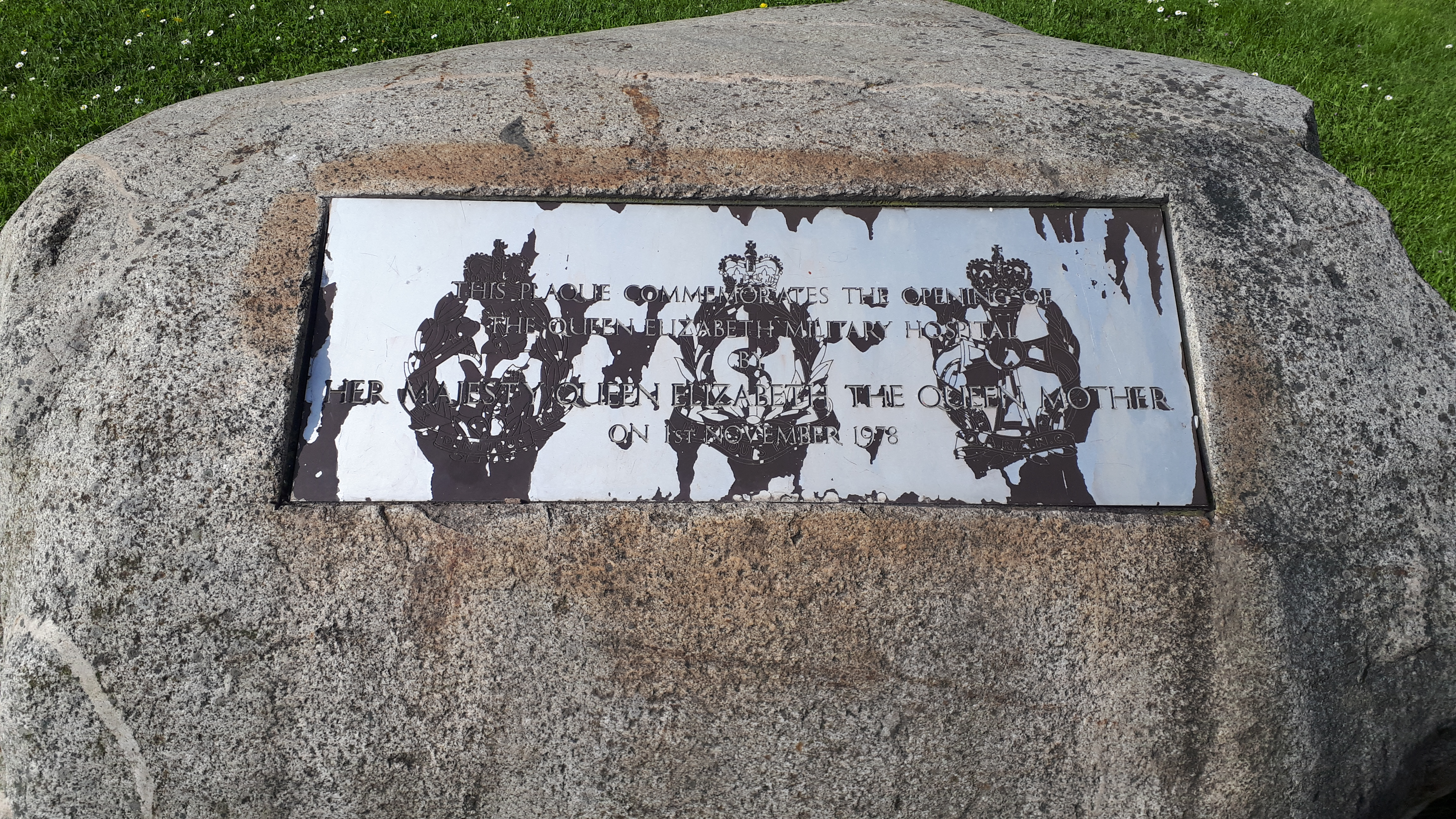
Plaque marking opening of Queen Elizabeth Military Hospital

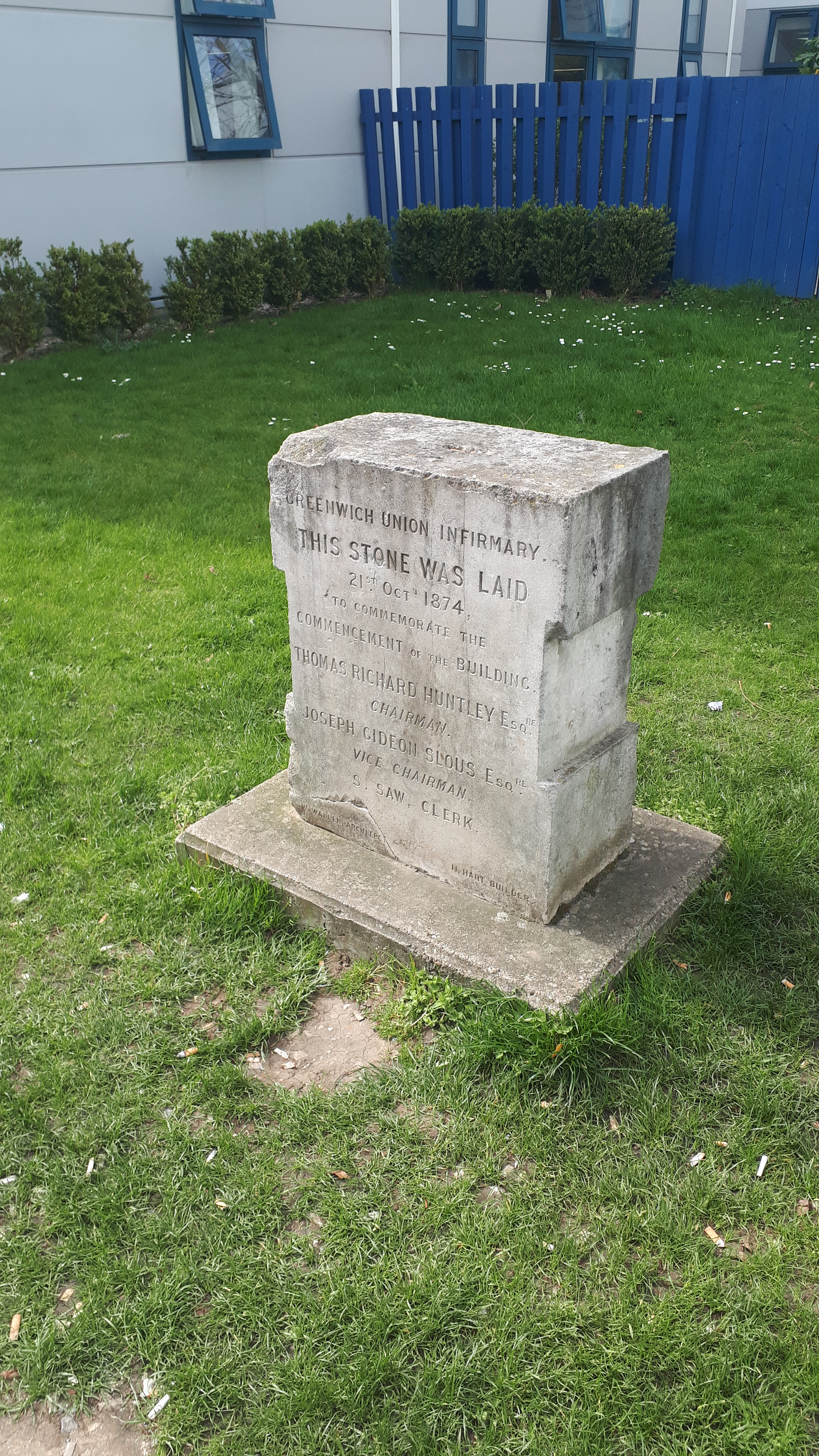
Foundation stone from Greenwich Union Infirmary

== See also ==
- Healthcare in London
- List of hospitals in England
