= Maze Hill =

Coordinates: 51.481209°N 0.003669°E

- Location within Greater London
- OS grid reference: TQ402780
- London borough: Greenwich
- Ceremonial county: Greater London
- Region: London
- Country: England
- Sovereign state: United Kingdom
- Post town: LONDON
- Postcode district: SE10
- Dialling code: 020
- Police: Metropolitan
- Fire: London
- Ambulance: London
- London Assembly: Greenwich and Lewisham

Maze Hill is an area in Greenwich and Blackheath, in south-east London, lying to the east of Greenwich Park, and west of the Westcombe Park area of Blackheath. It is part of the Royal Borough of Greenwich, and takes its name from the main thoroughfare, Maze Hill. It gives its name to Maze Hill railway station.

The road is believed to have taken its name from Sir Algernon May, who lived nearby until 1693, or after Robert May who lived there in 1683. 'Moys Hill' is marked on Rocque's 1745 map, 'Maize Hill' on Greenwood's 1827 map, and 'Maze Hill' on Bacon's map of 1888.

While working as surveyor to the Royal Hospital, the architect Sir John Vanbrugh lived (1719–1726) in a house of his own design, now known as Vanbrugh Castle, overlooking the park on what is now Maze Hill. Immediately to the north of Vanbrugh Castle was Mayfield Lodge, once used to print The Kentish Mercury, and from 1861 a Rescue Society for Females home (marked as 'female reformatory' on maps) which was demolished in 1906.

The southern end of Maze Hill is adjacent to an area marked on Rocque's 1745 map as 'Vanbrugh Fields', with his name surviving in local street names including 'Vanbrugh Park' and 'Vanbrugh Hill'.

Royal Ordnance Factories F.C. played some matches at Maze Hill.

One of the two sites of the comprehensive secondary school, The John Roan School, is situated at the southern end of Maze Hill (the other is on Westcombe Park Road). Greenwich District Hospital (and its predecessor, St Alfege's Hospital) was sited at the northern end of Maze Hill until its closure in 2001 and demolition in 2006; the site is now occupied by a residential development surrounding a Royal Borough of Greenwich leisure centre, library and services complex.

The southern part of Maze Hill (plus Westcombe Park) falls within the Blackheath Westcombe ward of the Royal Borough of Greenwich; the northern area of Maze Hill is in Peninsula Ward.
