= Cymserine =

Chemical compound

Identifiers
- IUPAC name: ((3aS,8aR)-1,3a,8-trimethyl-1,2,3,3a,8,8a-hexahydropyrrolo[2,3-b]indol-5-yl)-4-isopropylphenylcarbamate
- CAS Number: 145209-39-8
- PubChem CID: 9907847
- ChemSpider: 26000641
- UNII: EOI96371PZ
- CompTox Dashboard (EPA): DTXSID10432696

Chemical and physical data
- Formula: C_{23}H_{29}N_{3}O_{2}
- Molar mass: 379.504 g·mol^{−1}
- 3D model (JSmol): Interactive image
- SMILES: C[C@@]12[C@@](N(C)CC2)([H])N(C)C3=CC=C(OC(NC4=CC=C(C(C)C)C=C4)=O)C=C31
- InChI: InChI=1S/C22H27N3O2/c1-14(2)15-5-7-16(8-6-15)23-22(26)27-17-9-10-20-19(13-17)18-11-12-24(3)21(18)25(20)4/h5-10,13-14,18,21H,11-12H2,1-4H3,(H,23,26)/t18-,21+/m0/s1; Key:WHFRVERUBMJQSO-GHTZIAJQSA-N

Cymserine is a drug related to physostigmine, which acts as a reversible cholinesterase inhibitor, with moderate selectivity (15 times) for the plasma cholinesterase enzyme butyrylcholinesterase, and relatively weaker inhibition of the better-known acetylcholinesterase enzyme. This gives it a much more specific profile of effects that may be useful for treating Alzheimer's disease without producing side effects such as tremors, lacrimation, and salivation that are seen with the older nonselective cholinesterase inhibitors currently used for this application, such as donepezil.

== Derivatives ==
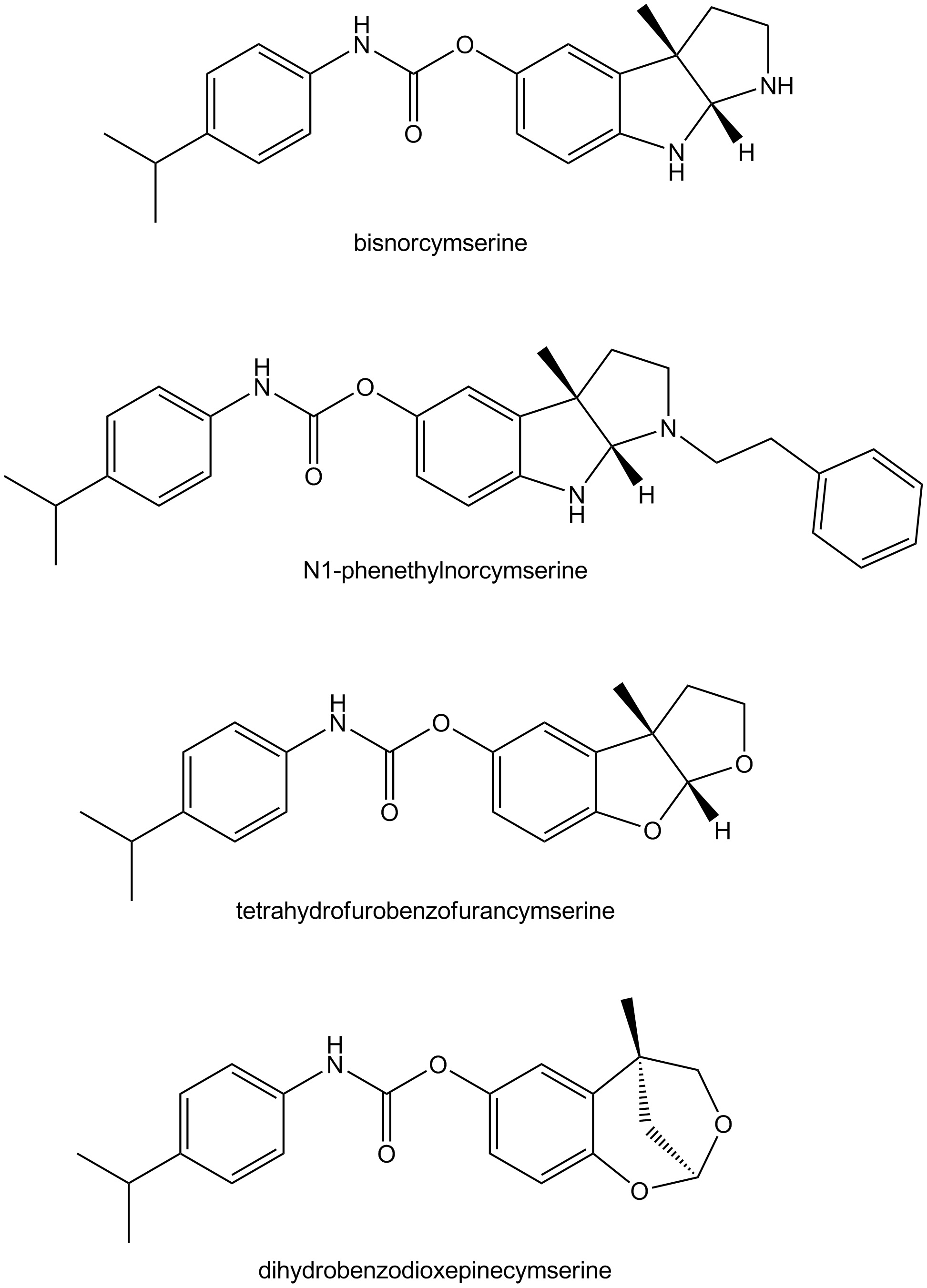
Derivatives of cymserine

A number of cymserine derivatives have been developed with much greater selectivity for butyrylcholinesterase, and both cymserine and several of its analogues have been tested in animals, and found to increase brain acetylcholine levels and produce nootropic effects, as well as reducing levels of amyloid precursor protein and amyloid beta, which are commonly used biomarkers for the development of Alzheimer's disease (potentially indicating the drugs as candidates to be the first medicine capable of stopping, and even reversing, the progression of the disease).

== Metabolism ==
The prospect of cymserine administration in Alzheimer's disease patients is hindered by its toxic metabolites. A portion of administered cymserine is metabolized in the body into eseroline, a potent mu opioid agonist and neurotoxin. As such, derivatives of cymserine which share its effects and mechanism of action but differ in their metabolic pathways would theoretically produce much fewer side-effects and have a greatly reduced risk of neurotoxic damage occurring with long-term administration (which could ultimately result in a greater loss of mental capacity than Alzheimer's disease itself). The search for cymserine derivatives which do not serve as prodrugs to eseroline is ongoing.
