= Eserethole =

Chemical compound

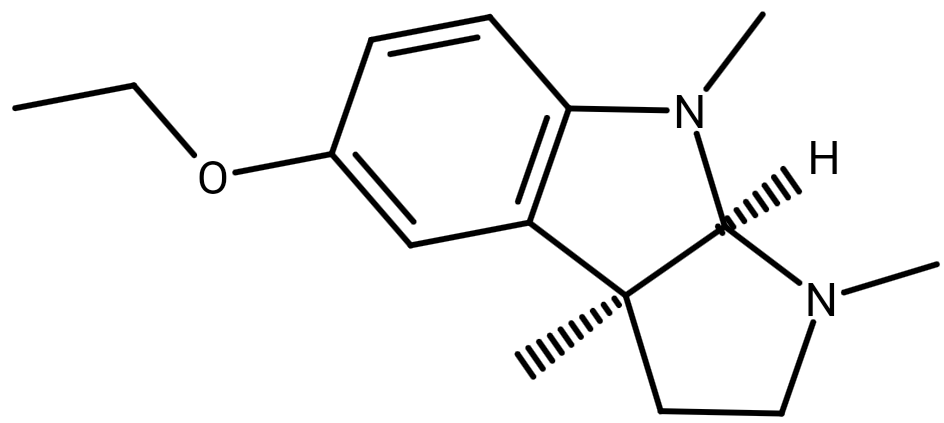

Names
- IUPAC name (3aR,8bS)-7-ethoxy-3,4,8b-trimethyl-2,3a-dihydro-1H-pyrrolo[2,3-b]indole
- Other names: Eserethol; (-)-Eserethole; Pyrrolo(2,3-b)indole, 5-ethoxy-1,2,3,3a,8,8a-hexahydro-1,3a,8-trimethyl-, (3aS,8aR)-

Identifiers
| CAS Number | 469-23-8 |
| 3D model (JSmol) | Interactive image; Interactive image |
| ChemSpider | 9054687 |
| PubChem CID | 10879418 |
| UNII | IP09BY41GA |
| CompTox Dashboard (EPA) | DTXSID701135279 |
- InChI: InChI=1S/C15H22N2O/c1-5-18-11-6-7-13-12(10-11)15(2)8-9-16(3)14(15)17(13)4/h6-7,10,14H,5,8-9H2,1-4H3/t14-,15+/m1/s1 Key: KQWOEHQIZVGMMT-CABCVRRESA-N
- SMILES: CCOC1=CC2=C(C=C1)N(C3C2(CCN3C)C)C; CCOC1=CC2=C(C=C1)N([C@@H]3[C@]2(CCN3C)C)C

Properties
| Chemical formula | C_{15}H_{22}N_{2}O |
| Molar mass | 246.35 g/mol |
| Appearance | Red to Dark Red Semi-Solid |
| Solubility | Chloroform (Sparingly); Ethanol (Slightly) |
| log P | 1.5 |
- Except where otherwise noted, data are given for materials in their standard state (at 25 °C [77 °F], 100 kPa). Infobox references

Eserethole is a nitrogen-containing organic compound (C_{15}H_{22}N_{2}O). It possesses a unique bicyclic structure, combining an indole and a pyrrole ring system. It is used in the synthesis of various alkaloids.

== Discovery ==
Discovery of eserethole is associated with a scientific competition in the 1930s. Two research groups were independently trying to synthesize the drug physostigmine. One group, led by Percy Julian at Howard University aimed to create d,l-eserethole as a crucial intermediate step. Another group, working under Sir Robert Robinson also reported the synthesis of d,l-eserethole around the same time.

However, the d,l-eserethole reported by Julian's group exhibited entirely different properties compared to that of Robinson's group. Ultimately, eserethole synthesized by Julian's group was proved to be the actual compound based on melting point equivalence with eserethole obtained from natural sources.

== Properties ==
Eserethole is not an end product itself, but rather a molecule formed during the synthesis of other compounds, particularly alkaloids found in Calabar bean.

It exists as a red to dark red semi-solid and is usually stored at 253K under inert conditions. It is sparingly soluble in non-polar solvents like chloroform and slightly soluble in polar solvents like ethanol.

Eserethole contains a pyrrolo-indole aromatic ring system with a pyrrole ring attached to a indole ring. It has two stereocenters.

== Uses ==
Eserethole is a vital building block in the synthesis of physostigmine, a naturally occurring alkaloid and acetylcholinesterase inhibitor used to treat glaucoma and delayed gastric emptying.

It is also intermediate in the synthesis of other alkaloids with acetylcholinesterase-inhibiting properties like (-)-physovenine, (-)-geneserine, etc.
