= Miller General Hospital =

Coordinates: 51°28′31″N 0°1′16″W

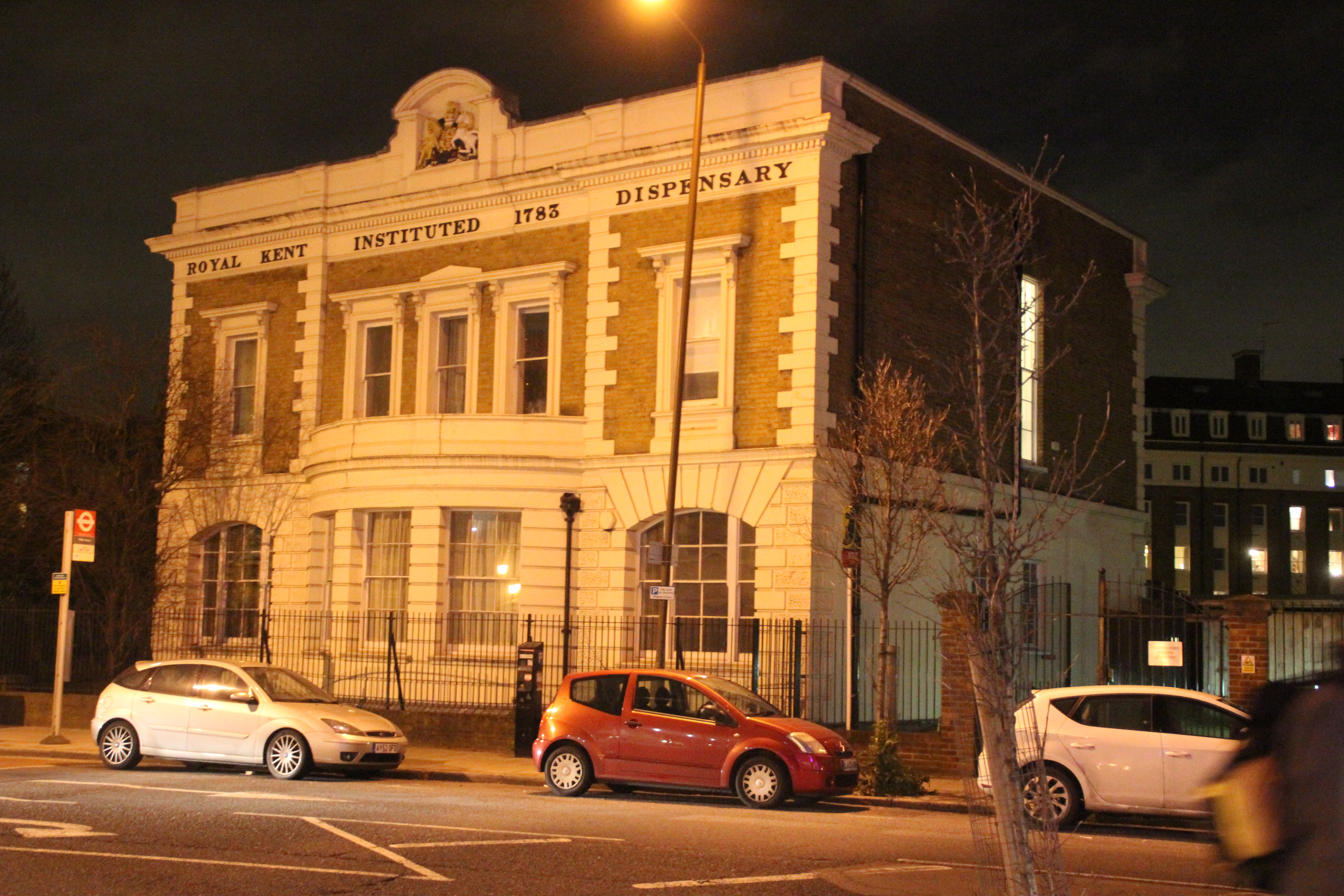
- Royal Kent Dispensary, Greenwich High Road

- Location within the Royal Borough of Greenwich

Geography
- Location: Greenwich High Road, Greenwich, London, England, United Kingdom

Organisation
- Care system: NHS England
- Type: District General

History
- Founded: 1884
- Closed: 1974

Links
- Lists: Hospitals in England

The Miller General Hospital was a hospital in Greenwich, London from 1884 until 1974. It was developed adjacent to an earlier dispensary, and was the first British hospital designed with circular wards, and one of the first to have an X-ray department.

== History ==
In 1783, the Kent Dispensary opened in a house in the Broadway, Deptford. It later (1837) earned royal patronage from Queen Victoria and became the Royal Kent Dispensary. In 1851, this was forced to move to a new building (completed in 1855; architects Brandon & Ritchie) nearby in Greenwich High Road.

To mark the Dispensary's centenary in 1883, it was decided to build a hospital named after the Revd Canon John Cale Miller (1814–1880), vicar of St Alfege Church, Greenwich and a supporter of the Dispensary. The Miller Memorial Hospital opened in December 1884, with 25 beds. It was the first British hospital to have circular wards—they were 35 feet (11m) in diameter, so avoiding corners which might harbour stale air and germs (a theory championed by surgeon John Marshall)—designed by Keith Downes Young of the architects Young and Hall. There were two wards, named Beatrice Ward and John Penn Ward (John Penn and Sons was a prominent local employer). In April 1898, a new temporary out-patients wing was opened by philanthropist John Passmore Edwards, treating 50–60 people per day.

In 1908, the Hospital was renamed the Miller General Hospital for South East London. Neighbouring land and properties were purchased, and work on a new extension began in 1911, a foundation stone being laid by William Legge, 6th Earl of Dartmouth. The new William Bucknell Wing was officially opened on 15 November 1912 by Princess Louise, Duchess of Argyll, and increased the hospital's bed capacity to 76. The four-storey building, which cost £23,000, included a purpose-built X-ray department—possibly the first in Britain—located in the basement, expanding on pioneering work started in 1896 by surgeon Thomas Moore.

Following the outbreak of the First World War, beds were made available for wounded and sick servicemen. In 1917 the hospital took over a 14-bed convalescent home in Bexhill-on-Sea, which had belonged to the Deptford Medical Mission, and this became the Miller General Hospital Convalescent Home (later, 1931, the Fountain Convalescent Home, and after the Second World War, requisitioned by the Bexhill Corporation for housing).

The Greenwich hospital was further expanded in 1928 with construction of the Robinson Wing, named after John Henry Robinson, then chairman of the hospital, and increasing the hospital's capacity to 151 beds. A new operating theatre was also installed in the Bucknell Wing, and a nurses' home built in Catherine Grove. Seven years later, in 1935, a new 16-bed ward was added to the Robinson Wing, and a new Out-Patients Department was opened in the late 1930s.

During the Second World War, the Hospital joined the Emergency Medical Service, reserving 10 of its 172 beds for civilian or military casualties, and in 1948, it joined the National Health Service, along with St Alfege's Hospital, under the control of the Greenwich and Deptford Hospital Management Committee, part of the South East Metropolitan Regional Hospital Board.

In 1965 the hospital was absorbed by Greenwich District Hospital (formerly St Alfege's), becoming the Miller General Wing. However, in need of expensive modernisation, it was closed in 1974. Services were transferred to the District Hospital, and most of the Miller buildings were demolished in 1975. The original Dispensary (a Grade II listed building), the general wing building (also listed Grade II) and nurses' home survive, having been redeveloped by Bellway Homes as residential accommodation.

== Notable staff ==
- Elsie Mussett (1874–1945), matron from 1909 until her retirement in 1928. Mussett trained at the London Hospital under Eva Luckes between 1900 and 1902. After working as a staff nurse, she was promoted to holiday sister, and ward sister, and left when she was appointed matron of the Miller Hospital. During World War I, she was mentioned in dispatches for her work at the hospital which also cared for military patients.
