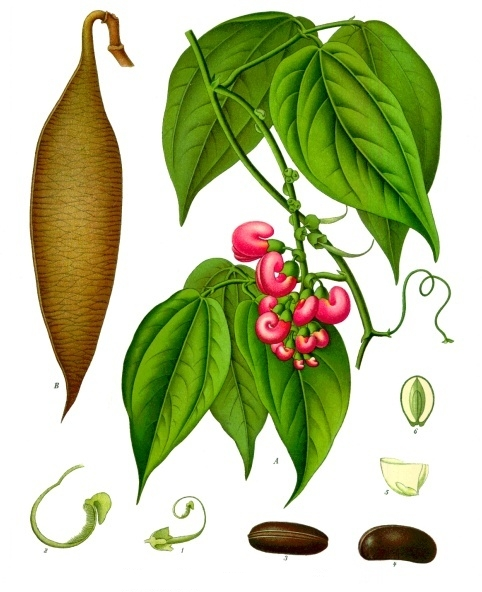

Scientific classification
- Kingdom: Plantae
- Clade: Tracheophytes
- Clade: Angiosperms
- Clade: Eudicots
- Clade: Rosids
- Order: Fabales
- Family: Fabaceae
- Subfamily: Faboideae
- Genus: Physostigma
- Species: P. venenosum

Binomial name
- Physostigma venenosum Balf.

= Physostigma venenosum =

Species of plant

Physostigma venenosum, the Calabar bean or ordeal bean, is a species of leguminous plant in the family Fabaceae, endemic to tropical Africa, with a seed poisonous to humans. It derives the first part of its scientific name from a curious beak-like appendage at the end of the stigma, in the centre of the flower; this appendage, though solid, was originally believed to be hollow (hence the name from φῦσα, a bladder, and stigma).

== Growth ==
The plant is a large, herbaceous, climbing perennial, with the stem woody at the base, up to 5 centimetres (2 in) in diameter; it has a habit like the scarlet runner, and attains a height of about 15 m (50 ft). The flowers, appearing in axillary peduncles, are large, about 25 mm-long (1 in), grouped in pendulous, fascicled racemes pale-pink or purplish, and heavily veined with purple. The seed pods, which contain two or three seeds or beans, are 15–18 cm (6–7 in) in length, and the beans are about the size of an ordinary horse bean but less flattened, with a deep chocolate-brown color.

== Toxicology ==
Calabar bean contains physostigmine, a reversible cholinesterase inhibitor alkaloid. The alkaloid physostigmine acts in effect like nerve gas, affecting communication between the nerves and muscles and resulting in copious salivation, seizures, loss of control over the bladder and bowels, and eventually loss of control over the respiratory system, causing death by asphyxiation.

=== Phytochemistry ===
Contains indole alkaloids such as physostigmine, physovenine, eseramine, eseridine (or geneserine) and calabarine.

=== Antidote ===
The main antidote to Calabar bean poisoning is the slightly less toxic tropane alkaloid atropine, which may often succeed; other measures include those usually employed to stimulate the circulation and respiration. Unfortunately, the antagonism between physostigmine and atropine is not perfect, and Sir Thomas Richard Fraser demonstrated in the 1860s that sometimes the action of the two drugs is summated and death results sooner than from either alone: namely, atropine will save life if three and a half times the fatal dose of physostigmine has been taken, but will hasten the end if four or more times the fatal dose has been ingested.

== Historical uses ==
The people of Old Calabar in present-day Nigeria used Calabar beans or 'E-ser-e' as an ordeal poison, and administered them to persons accused of witchcraft or other crimes. It was considered to affect only the guilty; if a person accused of a crime ingested the beans without dying, they were considered innocent. A form of dueling with the seeds was also practiced, in which the two opponents divided a bean, each eating one half; this quantity has been known to kill both adversaries. Although highly poisonous, the bean has nothing in external aspect, taste, or smell to distinguish it from any harmless leguminous seed, and disastrous effects have resulted from its being incautiously left in the way of children. The beans were first introduced into Britain in the year 1840, but the plant was not accurately described until 1861, and its physiological effects were investigated in 1863 by Sir Thomas Richard Fraser. The bean usually contains a little more than 1% alkaloid content. Two of these alkaloids have been identified, one called calabarine with atropine-like effects, and the other, the drug physostigmine (with the opposite effect), used in the treatment of glaucoma, anticholinergic syndrome, myasthenia gravis, and delayed gastric emptying.

== The Greenland Street poisonings ==
In August 1864, at least forty-six children aged between two and ten years old were admitted to the Southern hospital in Liverpool suffering from severe vomiting and abdominal pain. Doctors were able to establish that the children had consumed the Calabar bean in varying quantities after opening sacks of rubbish that had been deposited on waste ground between Greenland Street and New Bird Street. The sacks had been removed from the barque ship Commodore, which had recently arrived in the Queen's Dock Basin from West Africa. A six-year-old boy named Michael Russell, having eaten at least six of the beans, died ten minutes after arriving at the hospital. At the inquest, the coroner ordered that three shillings — £0.15 (equivalent to about £16 in 2025) — from the poor box was to be given to the parents of the deceased child.

== See also ==
- Percy Lavon Julian
- Stigmasterol
