= Greenwich District Hospital =

Coordinates: 51°29′07″N 0°0′33″E

- Greenwich Healthcare NHS Trust
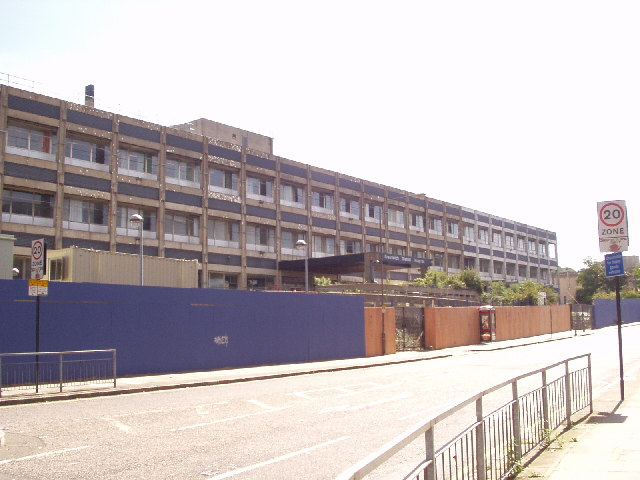
- Greenwich District Hospital just prior to demolition

- Location within the Royal Borough of Greenwich

Geography
- Location: Vanbrugh Hill, Greenwich, London, England, United Kingdom

Organisation
- Care system: NHS England
- Type: District General

Services
- Emergency department: Yes Accident & Emergency
- Beds: 650

History
- Founded: 1970
- Closed: 2001

Links
- Lists: Hospitals in England

Greenwich District Hospital was an acute district general hospital situated in the Maze Hill district of Greenwich, London. It was built in the 1960s on the site of St Alfege's Hospital, Greenwich, on the east side of Vanbrugh Hill, south of its junction with Woolwich Road.

== History ==
The hospital had its origins in St Alfege's Hospital in Greenwich which by the 1960s was in need of replacement. In order to build a hospital with a large enough capacity for the requirements of the local population (up to 800 beds) on a small site (less than 8 acres), a single large building was designed - Pevsner described it as "an unusually large enterprise to be undertaken by the Department of Health and Social Security (chief architect: W. E. Tatton Brown)". The new hospital was fully open by 1972, and it also absorbed services previously provided at the Miller General Hospital in west Greenwich, which finally closed in 1974.

The wards were located around the outside of the building, to receive natural light, while other departments such as operating theatres and laboratories were situated in the centre. The engineering services were contained in gaps between the floor and ceiling of each pair of storeys, so that maintenance work could be carried out without disruption to the running of the clinical areas of the hospital. The interior design was based on large, open areas which maximised the use of the available space, and which could be altered to match changing demands. The entire hospital was ventilated artificially to improve air quality.

The hospital closed in 2001, and its services were moved to the Queen Elizabeth Hospital, London. Some scenes from the film About A Boy, and the music video for Chain Reaction by the pop group Steps, were filmed in the closed hospital prior to its demolition in 2006.

An adjacent health centre - described by Pevsner as "an ugly A-frame with forceful raking struts" has also since been demolished.

The hospital site was redeveloped for mainly residential use, centred around Lambarde Square and Hawthorne Crescent, with some retail outlets along Woolwich Road. The health centre facilities were relocated to the Greenwich Centre, a building in Lambarde Square also housing a leisure centre, swimming pool and library.

== See also ==
- List of hospitals in England
