= St Leonard's Hospital, Hackney =

Coordinates: 51.5333°N 0.0774°W

St Leonard's Hospital
- Homerton University Hospital NHS Foundation Trust
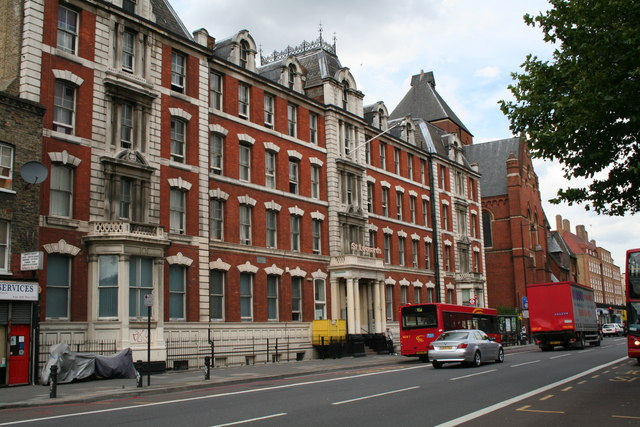
- St Leonard's Hospital

- Location within Hackney

Geography
- Location: Hoxton, London, England, United Kingdom

Organisation
- Care system: NHS England

History
- Founded: 1777

Links
- Lists: Hospitals in England

St Leonard's Hospital is a hospital in Hoxton, London.

== History ==
The hospital was founded as the infirmary for the St Leonard’s Shoreditch Workhouse in 1777. It was known as St Leonard's Infirmary. The workhouse was rebuilt between 1863 and 1866 and the infirmary was rebuilt in 1872. It had become known as St Leonard's Hospital by 1920 and came under the management of London County Council in 1930.

At the time of transfer to the London County Council the hospital had 571 beds and Medical Superintendent was TJ Keller MB BCh BA and the Steward was F C Yates. M Pilkington SRN (State Registered Nurse) was Matron having succeeded Inglis in 1928. Pilkington undertook her nurse training at the Nose Throat and Ear Hospital Birmingham.

Nurses' badges

It was the first hospital to receive casualties during the Blitz and then joined the National Health Service in 1948.

Although the hospital was the subject of a workers’ occupation aiming to keep the hospital open in July 1984, it ceased to operate as a general hospital later that year. Nevertheless the building continues to provide services on behalf of Homerton University Hospital NHS Foundation Trust.

== Notable staff ==
- Joanna (also known as Joan) Inglis, (1863–1958), Matron 1902- until at least 1928. Inglis trained at The London Hospital under Matron Eva Luckes between 1892-1894. After her training she worked as a staff nurse before moving on for promotion. She was a member of the County and County Borough Matrons Association, and also Treasurer of the Poor Law Infirmary Matrons Association. During her time as matron, Inglis significantly improved nursing and nurse training at the hospital and thereby contributed to the professionalisation of Poor Law Nursing.
- Edith Cavell served as Assistant Matron at the hospital from 1903 to 1906. Cavell had also trained at The London Hospital.

== See also ==
- List of hospitals in England
