= Constance Elizabeth Todd =

- Born: 8 November 1870; Beverley Yorkshire
- Died: 11 February 1960 (aged 89); Holderness Yorkshire
- Occupation: British Military Nurse

Constance Elizabeth Todd (November 1870 - January 1960) Royal Red Cross (RRC), Military Medal, was a British military nurse during the First World War, serving as Matron at the St John Ambulance Brigade Hospital Etaples and Deauville France. She was also a recipient of the venerable Order of Dame of Grace Order of St John of Jerusalem.

== Early life ==
Constance Elizabeth Todd was born in Beverley, Yorkshire November 1870 and was one of eight children, her father Stephen Ellis Todd was a solicitor.

== Nursing Career ==
Todd trained as nurse at Guy's Hospital, London between 1904 and 1907. Following her training she worked in Egypt as a private nurse and held the post of holiday sister at the Government Hospital Kasr-el-Aini Hospital, Cairo. On her return to England she undertook a house keeping course at the Royal Brompton Hospital London and then held the post as home sister at the Middlesex Hospital London prior to being appointed Matron at St James Hospital Balham in 1910. As Matron she oversaw the opening of St James Hospital Balham commissioning equipment and appointing nursing staff.

At the outbreak of First World War Todd was appointed Matron at the St John Ambulance Brigade Hospital, Etaples France. She was awarded the Royal Red Cross 1st Class in June 1917. In 1918 Todd received the Military Cross. This was in recognition for her "bravery and devotion" during an enemy air raid on the Brigade Hospital Etaples where she "moved freely about the wards during the bombing" giving encouragement to her staff and patients in her care. Todd remained in France until the end of the First World War taking charge of a military hospital in Deauville France.

At the end of the war Todd returned to her post as Matron at St James Hospital, Balham before retiring in 1935. She registered with the General Nursing Council in September 1922; registration number 6804.

== Later Life ==
On retirement Todd returned to Holderness, Yorkshire and was living with her sisters. She died 11 February 1960.
