= St Alfege's Hospital =

Coordinates: 51°29′07″N 0°0′33″E

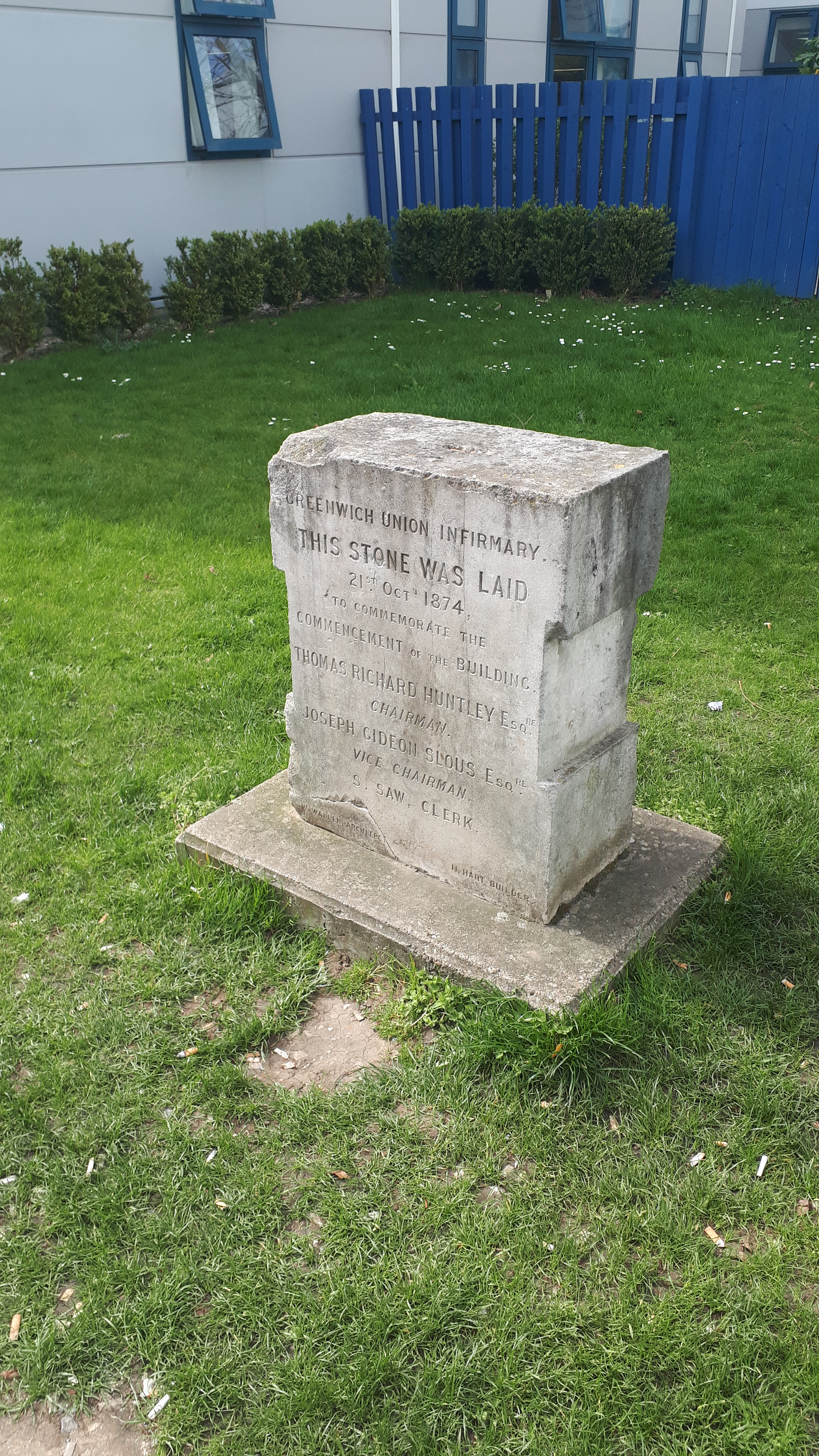
- Foundation stone from Greenwich Union Infirmary, preserved close to main entrance to Queen Elizabeth Hospital, London

- Location within the Royal Borough of Greenwich

Geography
- Location: Vanbrugh Hill, Greenwich, London, England, United Kingdom

Organisation
- Care system: NHS England
- Type: District General

History
- Founded: 1874
- Closed: 1968

Links
- Lists: Hospitals in England

St Alfege's Hospital was a hospital that operated in the Maze Hill area of east Greenwich in southeast London. It operated as the Greenwich Union Infirmary from 1874 to 1929. It was briefly known as the Greenwich and Deptford Hospital before becoming St Alfege's Hospital in 1931. It was then superseded by Greenwich District Hospital in 1968.

== History ==
=== 19th century ===
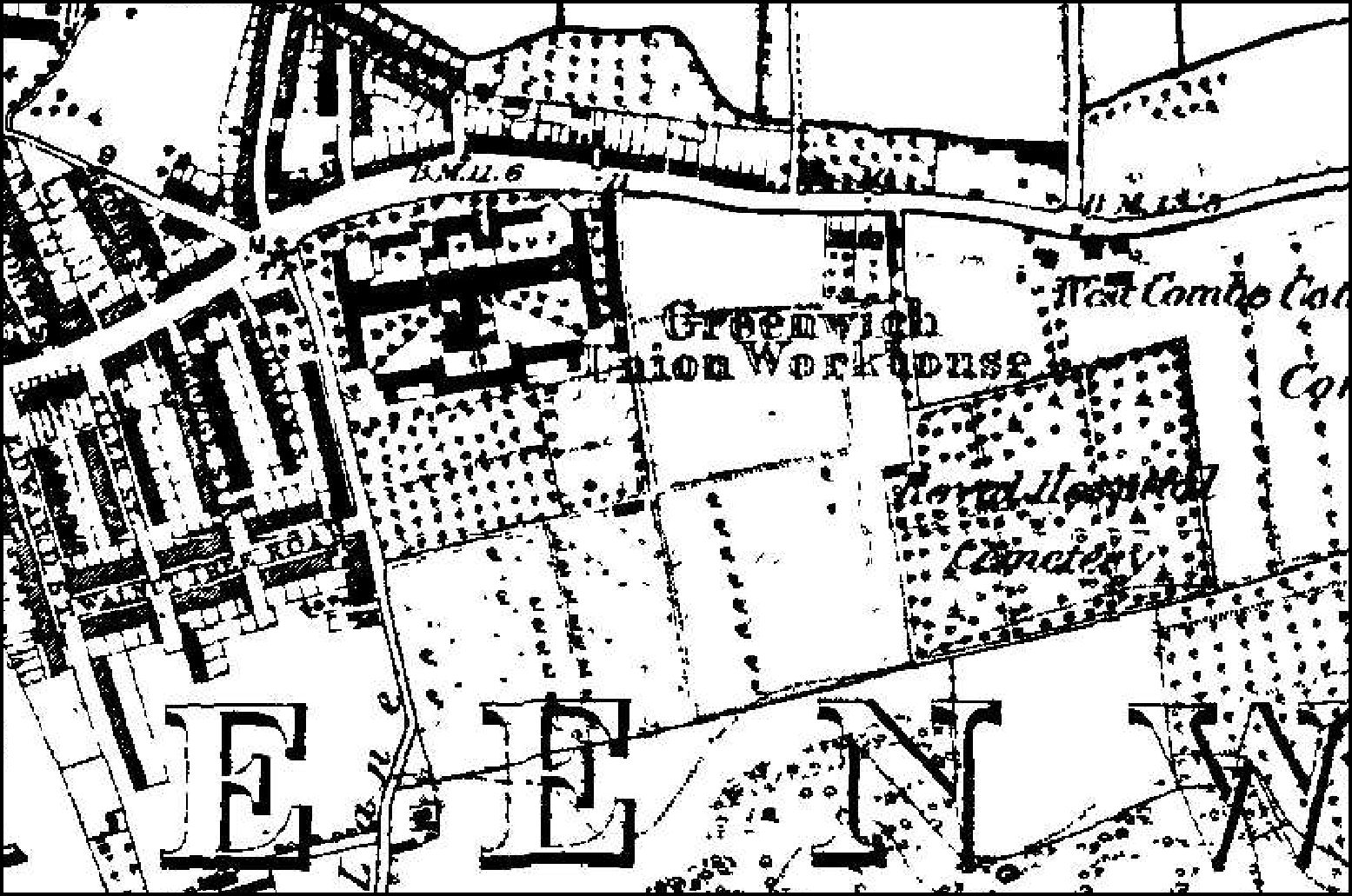
1882 map of part of east Greenwich, showing workhouse

The hospital developed from an infirmary created for the Greenwich and Deptford workhouse, which opened in 1840 on a site on the east side of Vanbrugh Hill, south of its junction with Woolwich Road; the architect, Robert Palmer Browne (1803-1872), later described his design as "plain but cheerful and almslike". The Greenwich Union Infirmary opened in 1874, consisting of two 3-storey pavilions (housing 400 patients) and a 4-storey administration and staff accommodation block, built on a 3-acre site south of the workhouse at a cost of £35,000.

In 1885 the Board of Guardians raised £14,800 from the Metropolitan Board of Works; two further infirmary blocks were built to house about 300 chronically sick inmates. Two further blocks, housing 250 patients were added in 1889. In 1898 the infirmary was certified as a nurse training school, and was soon also functioning as a general hospital with a staff of 150, including a medical officer and 60 nurses of varying grades.

=== 20th century ===
During the early 20th century, central heating and electrical lighting were installed, X-ray and massage departments were established, and in 1928 an operating theatre was installed. The following year, administration of the workhouse and infirmary was passed to London County Council and it was renamed the Greenwich and Deptford Hospital; at this date, the workhouse contained 846 beds for the chronic sick and the infirmary had 645 beds for acute patients. At the time of transfer to the London County Council, the medical superintendent was W. D. Wiggins MRCP, LRCP, DPH, the Steward was J. Anderson and the Matron was Miss Millward.

Nurses' badges

In 1930 a ward for tuberculosis patients, an out-patients department, pharmacy, antenatal clinic and nurses' sick bay facility were added. In 1931 the Hospital was renamed St Alfege's Hospital, after Alfege, Archbishop of Canterbury, murdered in Greenwich in 1012.

In 1934, while working at St Alfege's, Mary Broadfoot Walker first demonstrated the effectiveness of physostigmine in the treatment of the condition myasthenia gravis.

In 1948 the Hospital joined the NHS under the control of the South East Metropolitan Regional Hospital Board. In 1960 the Board ended the distinction between the workhouse and infirmary elements of the two St Alfege's Hospitals and merged them into one unit of 605 beds.

During the 1960s, demolition of the old workhouse and infirmary and building of a complete new hospital began. Phase 1 was completed in 1969, Phase 2 by the end of 1970 and Phase 3 by 1972. The new three-storey, 800-bed Greenwich District Hospital opened in 1972. The district hospital also replaced the Miller General Hospital in west Greenwich, which finally closed in 1974.
