= Shrapnel Barracks =

- Woolwich
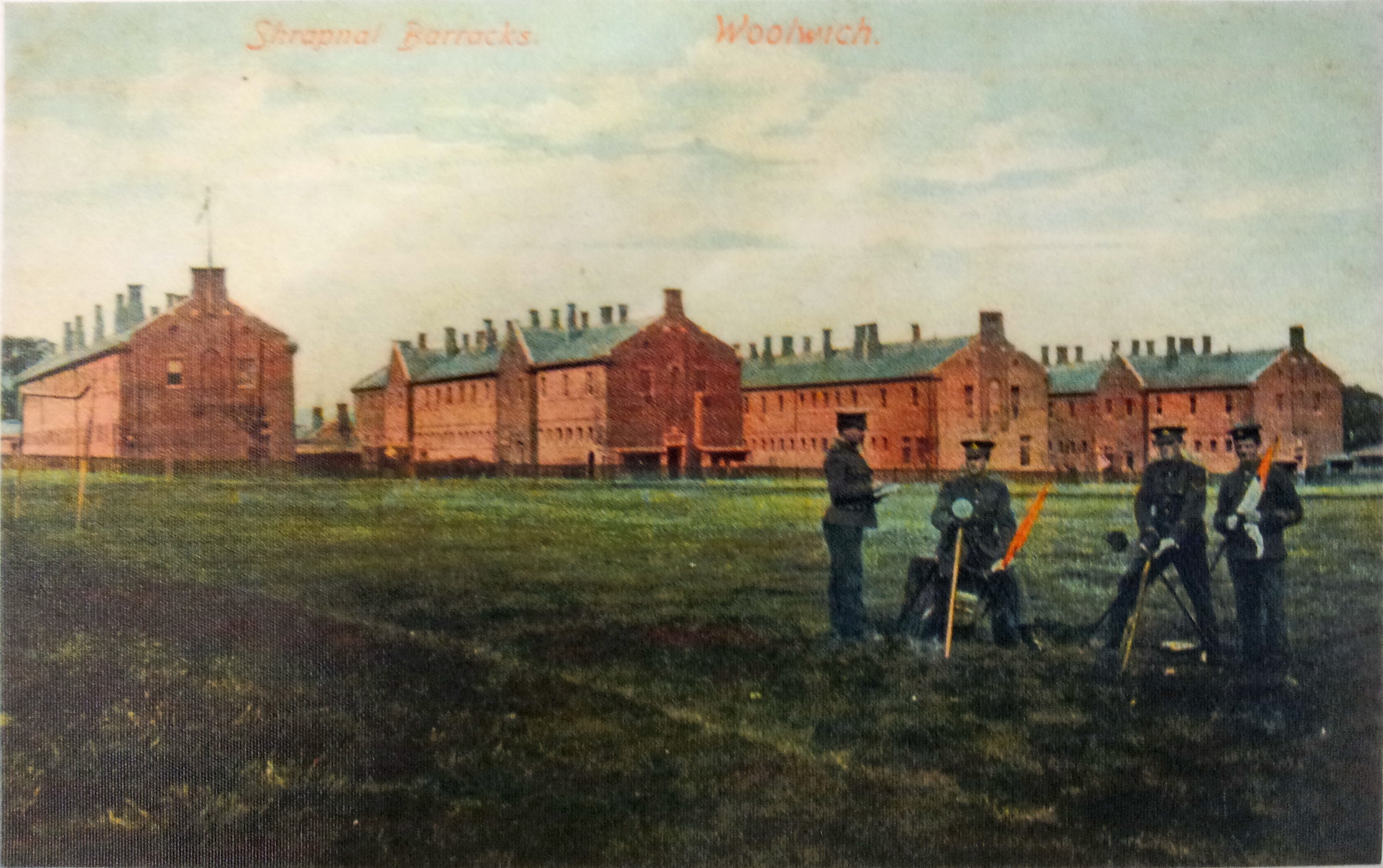

Site information
- Type: Barracks
- Owner: Ministry of Defence
- Operator: British Army

Location
- Location within London
- Coordinates: 51.4789°N 0.0511°E

Site history
- Built: c.1853
- In use: c.1853-c.1965

The Shrapnel Barracks was a British army base providing living accommodation in Woolwich in southeast London from the mid-19th century until the 1960s. Named after Lieutenant General Henry Shrapnel (who invented the shrapnel shell and was for some years based at the nearby Royal Arsenal), it was situated to the northwest of the modern-day Stadium Road, on the western edge of Woolwich Common; the site is now occupied by the Queen Elizabeth Hospital.

== History ==
=== Early history ===
A "hutted camp" on the site "dating from the Crimea" (1853-1856) is recorded and was the base for cavalry units stationed in Woolwich. (the Royal Artillery Barracks are nearby). The camp was in place before 1869 and is depicted as 'Hut Barracks' on the Ordnance Survey 1st edition map of that date. The Royal Horse Infirmary of the Army Veterinary Department stood immediately to the south, and there were several stable blocks in the vicinity.

==== Duke of York's Cottages ====
To the north of the barracks rows of huts had been laid out on the common, in lines running north-south, in the early years of the 19th century. They had been erected (with permission) by married artillerymen to house their own families (there were around a thousand married soldiers based in the Royal Artillery Barracks with no official housing provided). A contemporary account talked of "several hundreds" of these "mud huts" of which "the Government grew ashamed and had them replaced". Because they obstructed military use of the common, the garrison commander replaced them with rudimentary single-room dwellings (a hundred, arranged in pairs back-to-back), strung along the edge of the road to Charlton. Their inhabitants were charged rent to defray the cost. Later, additional dwellings were built for married NCOs, and an infant school was added (paid for by subscriptions from officers). The area was renamed the "Duke of York's cottages", though they were 'still always popularly called "the Huts"'. After an outbreak of diphtheria, the insanitary and overcrowded dwellings were demolished in the late 1870s. In 1887 the Remount Establishment of the Army Remount Service was built on the site.

=== Later history ===
In 1896 a new barracks was built and given the name Shrapnel Barracks; (plans dating from 1897 are held at the National Archives in Kew). They provided accommodation for a brigade of field artillery. A riding school and 'lines of new stables' were provided on the site. In 1904, the barracks was the scene of a double tragedy in which a soldier shot his girlfriend and then himself.

The old Hut Barracks, however, appear to have remained in use. Walter Besant in 1912 describes, from north to south: 'the remount depot, the shrapnel barracks with lines of new stables, the hut barracks, and the Royal Horse Infirmary, with stables beyond'. The 1911 census listed 567 persons 'in the Shrapnel Barracks and Huts'.

In 1910 the barracks were repurposed to serve as No. 1 (Eastern) Cavalry Depot. That year plans were drawn up by Harry Bell Measures for a new officers' mess and quarters, which were under construction the following year. The cavalry depot remained operational through the First World War; after the war the barracks reverted to accommodating a field artillery brigade.

During the Second World War, the barracks served as a mobilisation depot for regiments of artillery. In the early stages of the war, an anti-aircraft battery was built on the common, just east of the barracks, and manned by a battery of the Royal Regiment of Artillery. In 1940 it was armed with four 4.5-inch guns, helping protect areas of southeast London from enemy action; In 1944 it was upgraded to eight gun emplacements, equipped with 3.7-inch guns. On 28 October 1944, a V-2 rocket exploded prematurely above the barracks without causing any casualties.

The barracks was used by the Royal Artillery and the Women's Royal Army Corps before demolition in the 1960s.

== Hospital site ==
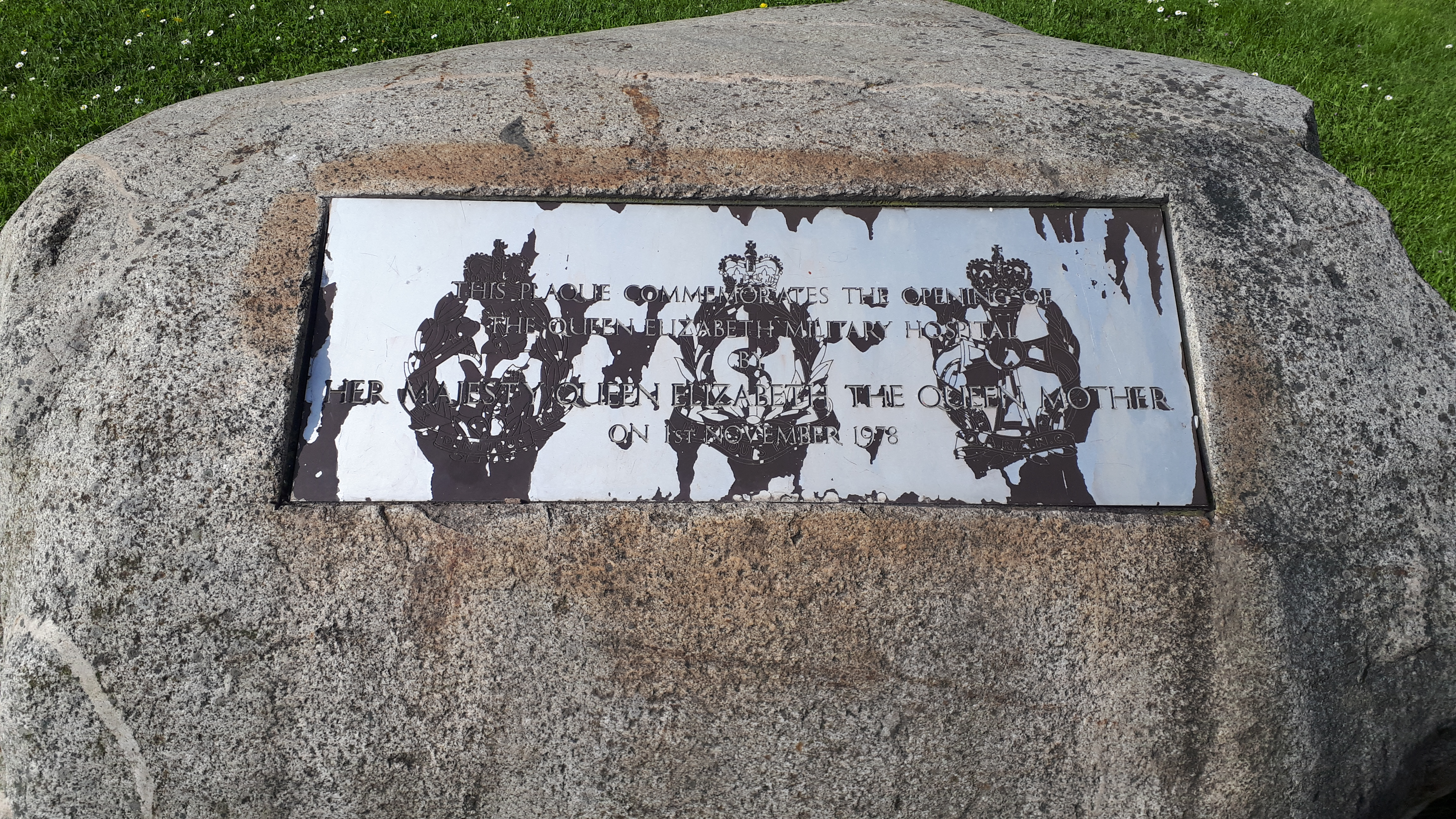
Plaque marking opening of Queen Elizabeth Military Hospital

The site was subsequently used for construction of the £16m Queen Elizabeth Military Hospital. A foundation stone was laid in 1972, with the hospital opening five years later, and being officially opened on 1 November 1978. The hospital had 456 beds in 16 wards, and cared for servicemen and their families, Chelsea Pensioners and Far East Prisoner of War survivors, plus local civilians. It closed in 1995 following government defence cuts. In March 2001 it was reopened as the Queen Elizabeth Hospital, and was later (2006) rebuilt and extended, though some original features, such as the main entrance, remain. The barracks name is recalled by a road, Shrapnel Close, skirting the western edge of part of the hospital site.

== Notable people connected with the barracks ==
Spike Milligan's father Leo joined the army as a boy soldier in the Royal Artillery at Shrapnel Barracks in 1904, while journalist Bill Deedes was stationed there briefly in 1940. Terence Thomas, Baron Thomas of Macclesfield was also stationed at the Shrapnel Barracks, in the 1950s.
