= St Benedict's Hospital =

- East Merton (Teaching) District Health Authority
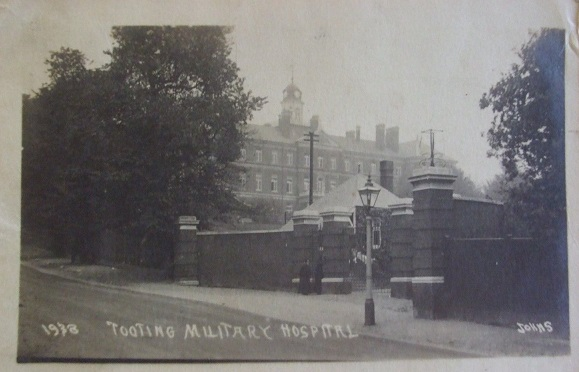
- St Benedict's Hospital

- Shown in Wandsworth

Geography
- Location: London
- Coordinates: 51.4258°N 0.1567°W

Organisation
- Care system: NHS England

Services
- Emergency department: No

History
- Founded: 1897
- Closed: 1981

St Benedict's Hospital was a long-stay hospital in Tooting in South London.

== History ==
The hospital was established in a disused Roman Catholic College building as the Tooting Home for the Aged and Infirm in 1897. During the First World War it served as the Church Lane Military Hospital (also known as the Tooting Military Hospital), with 712 beds for injured soldiers evacuated from the fighting in France. After the war it became a home for soldiers suffering from shell-shock. It closed in 1923 but was re-opened by the London County Council in 1930. It admitted three classes of patients: convalescents or those needing rehabilitation; the aged chronic sick; and young adults who were permanently incapable. At the time of reopening St Benedict's had 320 beds, the superintendent was W Pratt LMSSA and steward HW Sergeant. Miss H Harper was Matron.

The hospital joined the National Health Service in 1948, when it had 200 patients, coming under the control of the Wandsworth Hospital Management Committee, part of the South West Metropolitan Regional Hospital Board. The hospital had 246 beds in 1950. A further 50 beds were opened for fracture cases from St James' Hospital, Balham. In 1974, it came under the control of the Wandsworth, Sutton and East Merton (Teaching) District Health Authority. The hospital was occupied by the staff resisting closure from November 1979 to September 1980. It was latterly used for geriatric care and closed in 1981.

The site has been developed for housing, although the original gate pillars and the main entrance portico and clock tower remain. A green plaque was unveiled at the site by Wandsworth Borough Council on 9 March 2016.
