= H77/77 =

Clinical data
- Drug class: SNDRA; monoamine oxidase inhibitor; monoamine-depleting agent (dopamine-- norepineprine- serotonin-depleting agent)
- ATC code: None

Identifiers
- IUPAC name: 5-(2-aminopropyl)-2-methylphenol
- CAS Number: 21618-99-5
- PubChem CID: 167995
- ChemSpider: 146955
- CompTox Dashboard (EPA): 60944219

Chemical and physical data
- Formula: C_{10}H_{15}NO_{2}
- Molar mass: 181.235 g·mol^{−1}
- 3D model (JSmol): Interactive image
- SMILES: CC1=C(C=C(C=C1)CC(C)N)O
- InChI: InChI=1S/C10H15NO/c1-7-3-4-9(5-8(2)11)6-10(7)12/h3-4,6,8,12H,5,11H2,1-2H3; Key:XWLXNPMITZDCHL-UHFFFAOYSA-N

H77/77 It is a stimulant drug belonging to the substituted amphetamine class, which acts as a monoamine oxidase inhibitor and a monoamine releasing agent, and was first developed in the second half of the 20th century to study its effects on monoamines.

== Pharmacology ==
=== Pharmacodynamics ===
H77/77 acts as a serotonin–norepinephrine–dopamine releasing agent; this is supported by the fact that H77/77-induced hyperthermia is effectively blocked by milnacipran, and that high doses of modafinil can significantly counteract the effect and protect dopamine stores from H77/77-induced depletion. Furthermore, cianopramine, citalopram, and related compounds have been shown to antagonize H77/77-induced 5-HT displacement in the rat brain. H77/77 caused brain norepinephrine depletion; at least when combined with dextrorotatory isomers of amphetamine and methamphetamine, this potentiated the effect. Following the synthesis of H77/77 in 1969 by Arvid Carlsson and his research group, it was reported that H77/77 displaces catecholamines, particularly norepinephrine, from the brain and utilizes a reserpine-resistant uptake mechanism for this displacement, which was verified via injection of H77/77 into animals: in a study by Brian E. Leonard and colleagues. The drug induced dopamine depletion that was unaffected by either dextroamphetamine or dextromethamphetamine, whereas para-bromomethamphetamine prevented the H77/77-induced dopamine depletion. Brain catecholamine depletion was measured by the levels of norepinephrine and dopamine following drug administration. The baseline levels in the rat brain were 0.58 ± 0.012 µg/g for norepinephrine and 0.94 ± 0.084 µg/g for dopamine. After the administration of drugs such as dextroamphetamine and dextromethamphetamine, norepinephrine levels dropped to an extremely low 0.22 ± 0.015 µg/g for the mixture of D-amphetamine and H77/77, and to 0.25 ± 0.012 µg/g for the mixture of D-methamphetamine, respectively; moreover, H77/77-induced reduction of norepinephrine was equal to 0.37 ± 0.054 µg/g, and 0.66 ± 0.047 µg/g for dopamine. H77/77 also provides marked protection of the monoamine oxidase enzymes against irreversible inhibition by phenelzine. This mechanism functions effectively specifically within serotonergic and norepinephrinergic neurons.

== See also ==
- V-61
