= Monoamine-depleting agent =

Drug class

Reserpine, a monoamine-depleting agent

Monoamine-depleting agents are a group of drugs which reversibly deplete one or more of the monoamine neurotransmitters – serotonin, dopamine, and norepinephrine. One mechanism by which these agents act is by inhibiting reuptake by the vesicular monoamine transporters, VMAT1 and VMAT2. Examples of monoamine-depleting agents include deutetrabenazine, methyldopa, oxypertine, reserpine, tetrabenazine, and valbenazine. Tetrabenazine selectively depletes dopamine at low doses and is used as an animal model of amotivation.

Monoamine synthesis inhibitors, such as the tryptophan hydroxylase inhibitor and serotonin synthesis inhibitor para-chlorophenylalanine (PCPA or fenclonine), also act as monoamine-depleting agents, as do various other agents, for instance monoaminergic neurotoxins.

== See also ==
- Monoamine reuptake inhibitor
- Monoamine releasing agent
- Tetrabenazine § Animal model of motivational dysfunction
