= Reverse transport =

Reverse transport, or transporter reversal, is a phenomenon in which the substrates of a membrane transport protein are moved in the opposite direction to that of their typical movement by the transporter. Transporter reversal typically occurs when a membrane transport protein is phosphorylated by a particular protein kinase, which is an enzyme that adds a phosphate group to proteins.

The primary function of most neurotransmitter transporters is to facilitate neurotransmitter reuptake (i.e., the reabsorption of neurotransmitters by the cell which released them). During neurotransmitter reuptake, neurotransmitter transporters will move specific types of neurotransmitters from the extracellular space into the cytosol of a neuron or glial cell. When these transporters operate in reverse, they produce neurotransmitter efflux (i.e., the movement of neurotransmitters from the cytosol to the extracellular space via transporter-mediated release, as opposed to exocytotic release). In neurons, transporter reversal facilitates the release of neurotransmitters into the synaptic cleft, resulting in a higher concentration of synaptic neurotransmitters and increased signaling through the corresponding neurotransmitter receptors.

For example, monoamine releasing agents, such as amphetamines, produce cytosolic neurotransmitter efflux (i.e., the release of monoamine neurotransmitters from neurons into the synaptic cleft via monoamine transporter-mediated release) by triggering reverse transport at vesicular monoamine transporters (specifically, VMAT1 and VMAT2) and other monoamine transporters that are located along the plasma membrane of neurons (specifically, DAT, NET, and SERT). The precise mechanisms by which amphetamines and other monoamine releasing agents mediate induction of reverse transport are poorly understood. Protein kinase C (PKC) and Ca^{2+}/calmodulin-dependent protein kinase II alpha (CaMKIIα) have been shown experimentally to phosphorylate monoamine transporters and promote reverse transport after amphetamine exposure.

== See also ==
- Active transport
- Releasing agent
