= C20H24FN3O3 =

The molecular formula C_{20}H_{24}FN_{3}O_{3} (molar mass: 373.43 g/mol) may refer to:

- CP-615,003
- Ondelopran
