= Stigmine =

Class of acetylcholinesterase inhibitors

Pyridostigmine, a stigmine derivative.

Stigmine refers to a class of acetylcholinesterase inhibitors.

Examples include:

Drug	Primary use
Physostigmine	Anticholinergic poisoning, glaucoma
Neostigmine	Reversal of neuromuscular blockade, myasthenia gravis
Pyridostigmine	Myasthenia gravis
Distigmine	Urinary retention, myasthenia gravis
Rivastigmine	Alzheimer's disease and Parkinson's disease dementia

== Pharmacology ==
Stigmines are acetylcholinesterase inhibitors that increase the concentration of acetylcholine at cholinergic synapses by inhibiting its enzymatic breakdown. As a result, they enhance cholinergic neurotransmission at neuromuscular junctions and other cholinergic sites in the body.

== Medical uses ==
Various stigmine derivatives are used in medicine. Pyridostigmine and neostigmine are commonly used in the treatment of myasthenia gravis, while neostigmine is also used to reverse non-depolarizing neuromuscular blockade after surgery. Rivastigmine is used in the treatment of dementia associated with Alzheimer's disease and Parkinson's disease.

== History and etymology ==
The name "stigmine" is derived from physostigmine, a naturally occurring acetylcholinesterase inhibitor isolated from the Calabar bean (Physostigma venenosum). Later synthetic and semisynthetic acetylcholinesterase inhibitors adopted the suffix "-stigmine", leading to names such as neostigmine, pyridostigmine, and distigmine.
