= V61 =

V61 may refer to:

- V-61 (bull), an American bucking bull
- 4-Nitromethamphetamine
- ITU-T V.61, a telecommunications standard
- Mali-V61, a GPU
- Vanadium-61, an isotope of vanadium
- Vultee V-61, an American fighter aircraft
