= Cevimeline =

Pharmaceutical drug

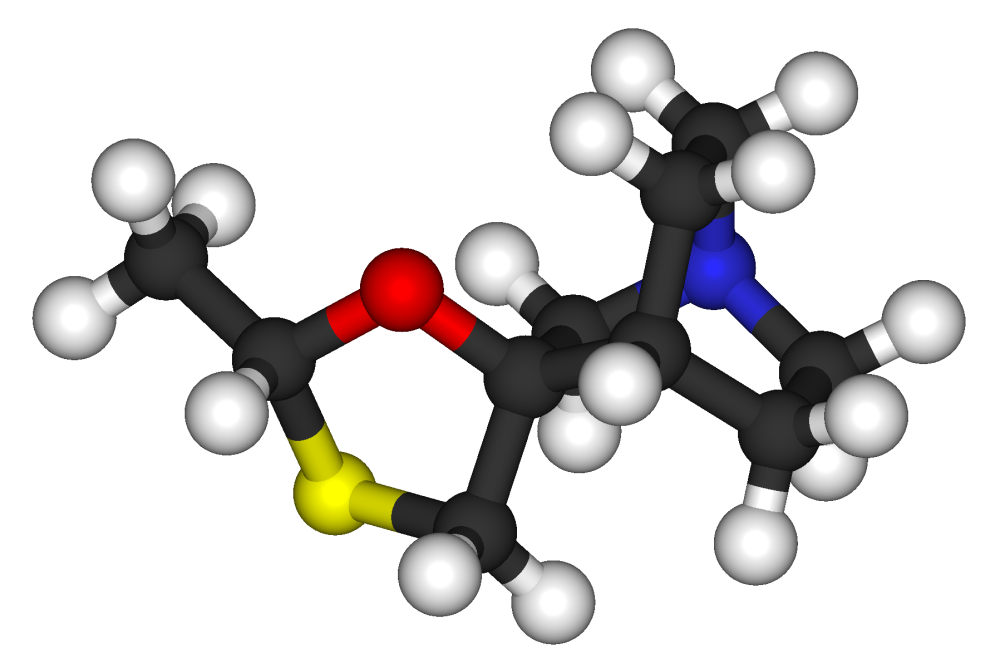

Clinical data
- Trade names: Evoxac
- AHFS/Drugs.com: Monograph
- MedlinePlus: a608025
- Pregnancy category: C
- Routes of administration: By mouth (capsules)
- ATC code: N07AX03 (WHO)

Legal status
- Legal status: In general: ℞ (Prescription only)

Pharmacokinetic data
- Protein binding: <20%

Identifiers
- IUPAC name: (2R,2R)-2'-Methylspiro[4-azabicyclo[2.2.2]octane-2,5'-[1,3]oxathiolane]
- CAS Number: 107233-08-9
- PubChem CID: 83898
- DrugBank: DB00185
- ChemSpider: 75707
- UNII: K9V0CDQ56E
- KEGG: D07667
- ChEBI: CHEBI:3568
- ChEMBL: ChEMBL1201267
- CompTox Dashboard (EPA): DTXSID801342027 DTXSID40274384, DTXSID801342027

Chemical and physical data
- Formula: C_{10}H_{17}NOS
- Molar mass: 199.31 g·mol^{−1}
- 3D model (JSmol): Interactive image
- SMILES: O1[C@H](SC[C@@]12CN3CCC2CC3)C
- InChI: InChI=1S/C10H17NOS/c1-8-12-10(7-13-8)6-11-4-2-9(10)3-5-11/h8-9H,2-7H2,1H3/t8-,10-/m1/s1; Key:WUTYZMFRCNBCHQ-PSASIEDQSA-N

Cevimeline (trade name Evoxac) is a synthetic analog of the natural alkaloid muscarine with a particular agonistic effect on M_{1} and M_{3} receptors. It is used in the treatment of dry mouth associated with Sjögren's disease.

== Medical uses ==
Cevimeline is used in the treatment of xerostomia (dry mouth) and Sjögren's syndrome. It increases the production of saliva.

== Side effects ==
Known side effects include nausea, vomiting, diarrhea, excessive sweating, rash, headache, runny nose, cough, drowsiness, hot flashes, blurred vision, and difficulty sleeping.

Contraindications include asthma and angle closure glaucoma.

== Mechanism of action ==
Cevimeline is a cholinergic agonist. It has a particular effect on M_{1} and M_{3} receptors. By activating the M_{3} receptors of the parasympathetic nervous system, cevimeline stimulates secretion by the salivary glands, thereby alleviating dry mouth.

== See also ==
- Pilocarpine — a similar parasympathomimetic medication for dry mouth (xerostomia)
- Bethanechol — a similar muscarinic parasympathomimetic with longer-lasting effect
