= Distigmine =

Chemical compound

Clinical data
- Routes of administration: By mouth, i.m.
- ATC code: N07AA03 (WHO)

Pharmacokinetic data
- Bioavailability: 4.65%
- Elimination half-life: 65 h
- Excretion: renal

Identifiers
- IUPAC name: (1-methylpyridin-1-ium-3-yl) N-methyl-N-{6-[methyl- (1-methylpyridin-1-ium-3-yl)oxycarbonylamino] hexyl}carbamate dibromide
- CAS Number: 17299-00-2; bromide: 15876-67-2
- PubChem CID: 27522
- ChemSpider: 25613
- UNII: T940307O7B; bromide: 750F36OP6J
- KEGG: D01228
- ChEBI: CHEBI:31512
- ChEMBL: ChEMBL1098285
- CompTox Dashboard (EPA): DTXSID60935985
- ECHA InfoCard: 100.036.360

Chemical and physical data
- Formula: C_{22}H_{32}Br_{2}N_{4}O_{4}
- Molar mass: 576.330 g·mol^{−1}
- 3D model (JSmol): Interactive image
- SMILES: [Br-].[Br-].O=C(Oc1ccc[n+](c1)C)N(CCCCCCN(C(=O)Oc2ccc[n+](c2)C)C)C
- InChI: InChI=1S/C22H32N4O4.2BrH/c1-23-13-9-11-19(17-23)29-21(27)25(3)15-7-5-6-8-16-26(4)22(28)30-20-12-10-14-24(2)18-20;;/h9-14,17-18H,5-8,15-16H2,1-4H3;2*1H/q+2;;/p-2; Key:GJHSNEVFXQVOHR-UHFFFAOYSA-L

Distigmine (as distigmine bromide) is a parasympathomimetic. Distigmine is similar to pyridostigmine and neostigmine but has a longer duration of action. It is available as tablets on prescription only. It is commonly used to treat various conditions, including myasthenia gravis and underactive bladder. Distigmine has a greater risk of causing cholinergic crisis because of accumulation of the drug being more likely than with neostigmine or pyridostigmine and so distigmine is rarely used as a treatment for myasthenia gravis, unlike pyridostigmine and neostigmine.
