= Bietaserpine =

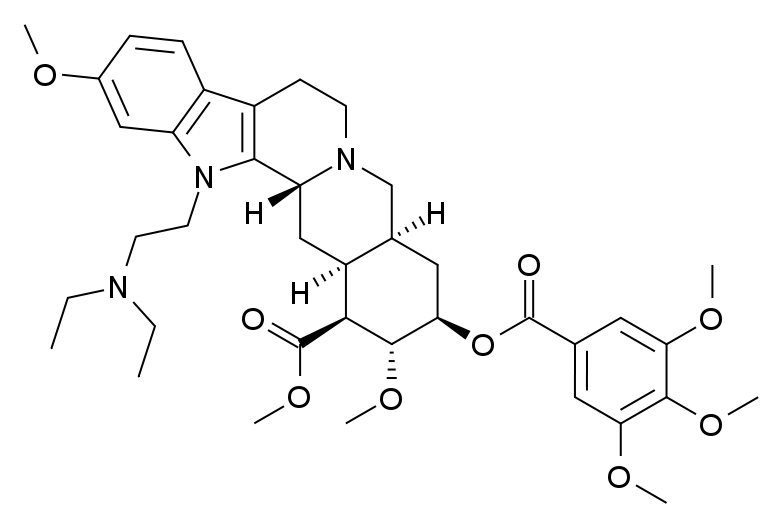

Names
- IUPAC name Methyl 1-[2-(diethylamino)ethyl]-11,17α-dimethoxy-18β-[(3,4,5-trimethoxybenzoyl)oxy]-3β,20α-yohimban-16β-carboxylate
- Systematic IUPAC name Methyl (1S,2R,3R,4aS,13bR,14aS)-13-[2-(diethylamino)ethyl]-2,11-dimethoxy-3-[(3,4,5-trimethoxybenzoyl)oxy]-1,2,3,4,4a,5,7,8,13,13b,14,14a-dodecahydroindolo[2′,3′:3,4]pyrido[1,2-b]isoquinoline-1-carboxylate

Identifiers
CAS Number	53-18-9
3D model (JSmol)	Interactive image
ChemSpider	16735698
ECHA InfoCard	100.000.151
PubChem CID	65518
UNII	0P5B94FVD5
CompTox Dashboard (EPA)	DTXSID301018918
- InChI: InChI=1S/C39H53N3O9/c1-9-40(10-2)15-16-42-29-20-25(45-3)11-12-26(29)27-13-14-41-22-24-19-33(37(49-7)34(39(44)50-8)28(24)21-30(41)35(27)42)51-38(43)23-17-31(46-4)36(48-6)32(18-23)47-5/h11-12,17-18,20,24,28,30,33-34,37H,9-10,13-16,19,21-22H2,1-8H3/t24-,28+,30-,33-,34+,37+/m1/s1 Key: WFTSRDISOMSAQC-ZNFOTRSXSA-N
- SMILES: COc1cc(cc(OC)c1OC)C(=O)O[C@@H]4C[C@@H]5CN6CCc3c(n(CCN(CC)CC)c2cc(OC)ccc23)[C@H]6C[C@@H]5[C@H](C(=O)OC)[C@H]4OC

Properties
Chemical formula	C_{39}H_{53}N_{3}O_{9}
Molar mass	707.865 g·mol^{−1}

Pharmacology
ATC code	C02AA07 (WHO)
- Except where otherwise noted, data are given for materials in their standard state (at 25 °C [77 °F], 100 kPa). verify (what is ?) Infobox references

Bietaserpine (INN), or 1-[2-(diethylamino)ethyl]reserpine, is a derivative of reserpine used as an antihypertensive agent. Like reserpine, bietaserpine is a VMAT inhibitor.
