= Robert Wilkins (disambiguation) =

Robert Wilkins (1896–1987) was an American blues musician.

Robert or Bob Wilkins may also refer to:

- Robert L. Wilkins (born 1963), United States judge
- Robert Wallace Wilkins (1906–2003), American medical investigator and educator
- Bobby Wilkins (1922–2010), baseball shortstop
- Bob Wilkins (1932–2009), television personality

== See also ==
- Robert Wilkin (disambiguation)
