= 4-Nitromethamphetamine =

Clinical data
- Pronunciation: /ˌfɔːr naɪtroʊmɛθəmˈfɛtəmiːn/
- Other names: 4-NO_{2}-MA; PNMA; 4-Nitromethylamphetamine; N-Me-PNA; V-61; 4-Nitro-N-methylamphetamine
- Drug class: Central nervous system stimulant; monoamine-depleting agent
- ATC code: none

Identifiers
- IUPAC name: N-methyl-1-(4-nitrophenyl)propan-2-amine
- CAS Number: 4302-88-9
- PubChem CID: 107258
- ChemSpider: 96527
- UNII: N0H8991I1E
- CompTox Dashboard (EPA): 00962851

Chemical and physical data
- Formula: C_{10}H_{14}N_{2}O_{2}
- Molar mass: 194.234 g·mol^{−1}
- 3D model (JSmol): Interactive image
- SMILES: CC(CC1=CC=C(C=C1)[N+](=O)[O-])NC
- InChI: InChI=1S/C10H14N2O2/c1-8(11-2)7-9-3-5-10(6-4-9)12(13)14/h3-6,8,11H,7H2,1-2H3; Key:FMYSLOHXMJLTRT-UHFFFAOYSA-N

4-Nitromethamphetamine (4-NO_{2}-MA, PNMA or 4-NMA), also known as 4-nitromethylamphetamine, N-Me-PNA, or by the code name V-61, is a central nervous system stimulant and monoamine-depleting drug; at high doses, it depleted monoamine neurotransmitters and led to death.

== Pharmacology ==
=== Pharmacodynamics ===
Low doses of V-61 caused a slight increase in the concentration of norepinephrine and dopamine in the rat brain; however, a dose of 60 mg/kg caused a decrease in the concentration of both catecholamines. V-61 caused behavioral hyperexcitability in animals only at doses approximately equal to half of its LD_{50} (68 mg/kg). Most likely, its mechanism is related to reuptake inhibition, resistant to reserpine, which is confirmed by the enhanced depletion of catecholamines by the drug H77/77. Doses of V-61 exceeding 1 mg/kg caused salivation, piloerection, and mild excitation in rats. When administered at doses of 30 mg/kg and higher, the animals became hyperactive and hyperthermic, and also displayed aggression when disturbed, occurring 2 hours after administration; the excitation was followed by exhaustion. If data for all animals receiving the drug are combined, approximately 30% of the rats receiving a dose of 60 mg/kg developed tonic convulsions and died. V-61 slightly decreased the levels of tyrosine, L-tryptophan, and only at the highest doses, GABA in the brain. The maximum reduction of tyrosine at high doses in serum was from 26.3 to 13.66, and for tryptophan from 20.6 to 12.9. V-61 caused depletion of 5-hydroxytryptamine (serotonin) and catecholamines.

== See also ==
- Substituted amphetamine
- H77/77
