= Valbenazine =

Chemical compound

Clinical data
- Trade names: Ingrezza
- Other names: NBI-98854
- AHFS/Drugs.com: Monograph
- MedlinePlus: a617023
- License data: US DailyMed: Valbenazine
- Routes of administration: By mouth
- ATC code: N07XX13 (WHO)

Legal status
- Legal status: US: ℞-only

Pharmacokinetic data
- Protein binding: >99%
- Metabolism: Activation by hydrolysis, deactivation by CYP3A, CYP2D6
- Metabolites: [+]-α-Dihydrotetrabenazine (active metabolite)
- Elimination half-life: 15–22 hrs
- Excretion: 60% urine, 30% faeces

Identifiers
- IUPAC name: (2R,3R,11bR)-3-Isobutyl-9,10-dimethoxy-1,3,4,6,7,11b-hexahydro-2H-pyrido[2,1-a]isoquinolin-2-yl L-valinate
- CAS Number: 1025504-45-3
- PubChem CID: 24795069
- DrugBank: DB11915
- ChemSpider: 28536134
- UNII: 54K37P50KH
- KEGG: D10675; as salt: D10999
- ChEMBL: ChEMBL2364639
- CompTox Dashboard (EPA): DTXSID801026306
- ECHA InfoCard: 100.236.234

Chemical and physical data
- Formula: C_{24}H_{38}N_{2}O_{4}
- Molar mass: 418.578 g·mol^{−1}
- 3D model (JSmol): Interactive image
- SMILES: CC(C)C[C@@H]1CN2CCc3cc(c(cc3[C@H]2C[C@H]1OC(=O)[C@H](C(C)C)N)OC)OC
- InChI: InChI=InChI=1S/C24H38N2O4/c1-14(2)9-17-13-26-8-7-16-10-21(28-5)22(29-6)11-18(16)19(26)12-20(17)30-24(27)23(25)15(3)4/h10-11,14-15,17,19-20,23H,7-9,12-13,25H2,1-6H3/t17-,19-,20-,23+/m1/s1; Key:GEJDGVNQKABXKG-CFKGEZKQSA-N

Valbenazine, sold under the brand name Ingrezza, is a medication used to treat tardive dyskinesia. It acts as a vesicular monoamine transporter 2 (VMAT2) inhibitor.

== Medical use ==
Valbenazine is used to treat tardive dyskinesia in adults. Tardive dyskinesia is a drug-induced neurological injury characterized by involuntary movements. The clinical trials that led to the approval of valbenazine by the US Food and Drug Administration (FDA) were six weeks in duration. An industry-sponsored study has studied the use of valbenazine for up to 48 weeks, in which it was found to be safe and effective for maintaining short-term (6 week) improvements in tardive dyskinesia.

== Contraindications ==
There are no contraindications for the use of valbenazine according to the prescribing information.

== Adverse effects ==
Side effects may include sleepiness or QT prolongation. Significant prolongation has not yet been observed at recommended dosage levels; however, those taking inhibitors of the liver enzymes CYP2D6 or CYP3A4 – or who are poor CYP2D6 metabolizers – may be at risk for significant prolongation.

Valbenazine has not been effectively studied in pregnancy, and it is recommended that women who are pregnant or breastfeeding avoid use of valbenazine.

== Pharmacology ==
=== Mechanism of action ===
Valbenazine is known to cause reversible reduction of dopamine release by selectively inhibiting pre-synaptic human vesicular monoamine transporter type 2 (VMAT2). In vitro, valbenazine shows great selectivity for VMAT2 and little to no affinity for VMAT1 or other monoamine receptors. Although the exact cause of tardive dyskinesia is unknown, it is hypothesized that it may result from neuroleptic-induced dopamine hypersensitivity because it is exclusively associated with the use of neuroleptic drugs. By selectively reducing the ability of VMAT2 to load dopamine into synaptic vesicles, the drug reduces overall levels of available dopamine in the synaptic cleft, ideally alleviating the symptoms associated with dopamine hypersensitivity. The importance of valbenazine selectivity inhibiting VMAT2 over other monoamine transporters is that VMAT2 is mainly involved with the transport of dopamine, and to a much lesser extent other monoamines such as norepinephrine, serotonin, and histamine. This selectivity is likely to reduce the likelihood of "off-target" adverse effects which may result from the upstream inhibition of these other monoamines.

=== Pharmacokinetics ===
Valbenazine is a prodrug which is an ester of [+]-α-dihydrotetrabenazine (DTBZ) with the amino acid L-valine. It is extensively hydrolyzed to the active metabolite DTBZ. Plasma protein binding of valbenazine is over 99%, and that of DTBZ is about 64%. The biological half-life of both valbenazine and DTBZ is 15 to 22 hours. Liver enzymes involved in inactivation are CYP3A4, CYP3A5 and CYP2D6. The drug is excreted, mostly in form of inactive metabolites, via the urine (60%) and the feces (30%).

== Society and culture ==
=== Legal status ===
Valbenazine is produced by Neurocrine Biosciences. Valbenazine was the first medication approved by the FDA for the treatment of tardive dyskinesia, in April 2017.

=== Economics ===
While Neurocrine Biosciences does not hold a final patent for valbenazine or elagolix, they do hold a patent for the VMAT2 inhibitor [9,10-dimethoxy-3-(2-methylpropyl)-1H,2H,3H,4H,6H,7H,11bH-pyrido-[2,1-a]isoquinolin-2-yl]methanol and related compounds, which includes valbenazine.

=== Names ===
The International Nonproprietary Name (INN) is valbenazine.

== Research ==
Valbenazine is being studied for the treatment of Tourette's syndrome.

== See also ==
- List of investigational antipsychotics
- List of investigational Tourette's syndrome drugs
