= C19H29NO3 =

The molecular formula C_{19}H_{29}NO_{3} (molar mass: 319.44 g/mol, exact mass: 319.2147 u) may refer to:

- Dihydrotetrabenazine (DTBZ)
- Homocapsaicin
