= Glycerophosphorylcholine =

Chemical compound

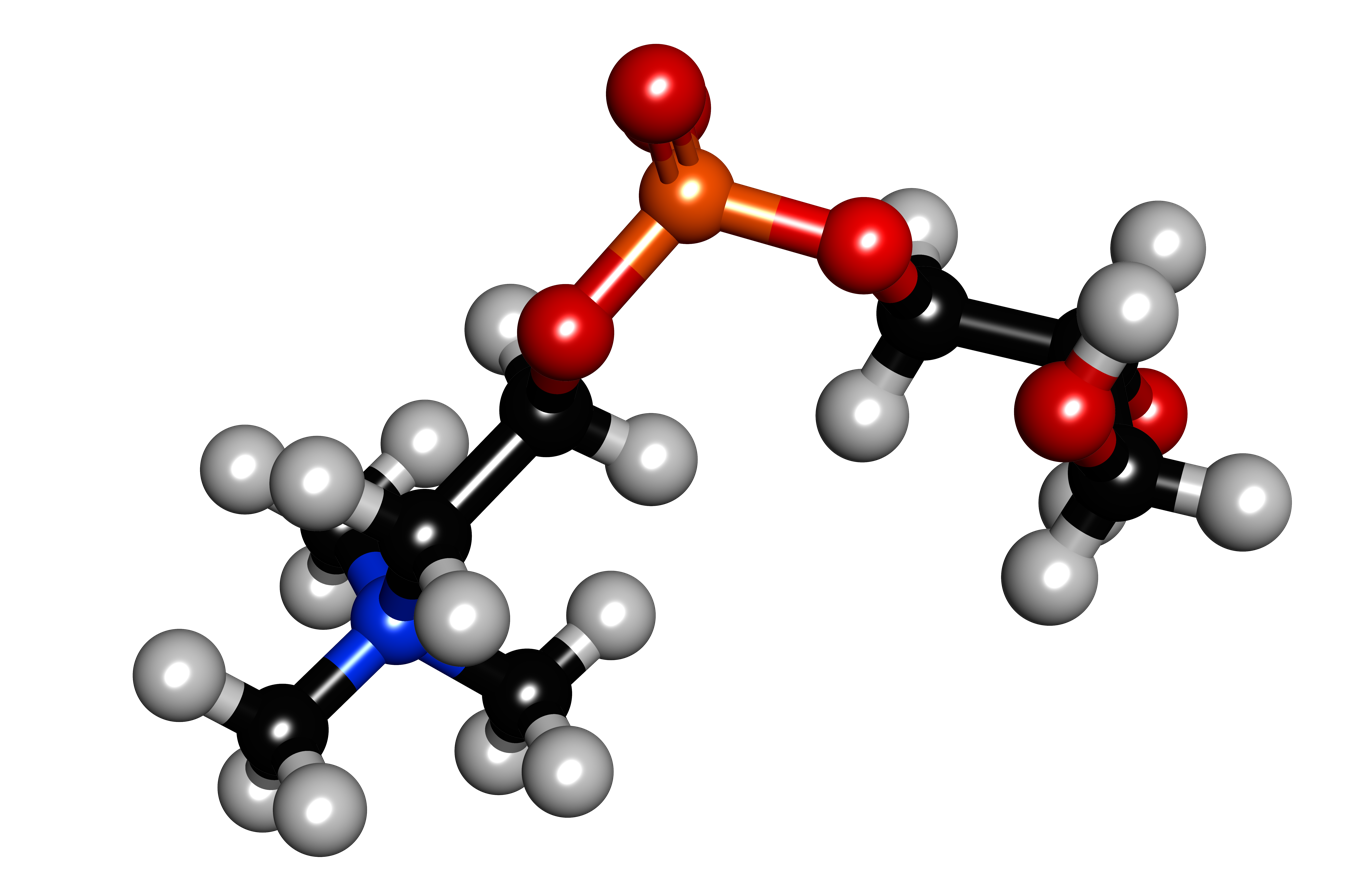

Clinical data
- ATC code: N07AX02 (WHO)

Legal status
- Legal status: In general: Over-the-counter (OTC)

Identifiers
- IUPAC name: [(2R)-2,3-Dihydroxypropyl] 2-trimethylazaniumylethyl phosphate
- CAS Number: 28319-77-9
- PubChem CID: 657272
- ChemSpider: 571409
- UNII: 60M22SGW66
- ChEBI: CHEBI:55397
- ChEMBL: ChEMBL1567463
- CompTox Dashboard (EPA): DTXSID70951010
- ECHA InfoCard: 100.044.496

Chemical and physical data
- Formula: C_{8}H_{20}NO_{6}P
- Molar mass: 257.223 g·mol^{−1}
- 3D model (JSmol): Interactive image
- SMILES: [O-]P(=O)(OC[C@H](O)CO)OCC[N+](C)(C)C
- InChI: InChI=1S/C8H20NO6P/c1-9(2,3)4-5-14-16(12,13)15-7-8(11)6-10/h8,10-11H,4-7H2,1-3H3/t8-/m1/s1; Key:SUHOQUVVVLNYQR-MRVPVSSYSA-N

L-α-Glycerophosphorylcholine (alpha-GPC, choline alfoscerate, sn-glycero-3-phosphocholine) is a natural choline compound found in the brain. It is also a parasympathomimetic acetylcholine precursor which has been investigated for its potential for the treatment of Alzheimer's disease and other dementias.

Alpha-GPC rapidly delivers choline to the brain across the blood–brain barrier and is a biosynthetic precursor of acetylcholine. It is a non-prescription drug in most countries. The FDA determined that intake of no more than 196.2 mg/person/day is considered generally recognized as safe (GRAS).

== Production ==
Industrially, alpha-GPC is produced by the chemical or enzymatic deacylation of phosphatidylcholine enriched soya phospholipids followed by chromatographic purification. Alpha-GPC may also be derived in small amounts from highly purified soy lecithin as well as from purified sunflower lecithin.

== Safety ==
A retrospective cohort study involving 12 million participants in South Korea found that α-GPC users had a higher risk of stroke (46 % higher). The authors suggested that one possible explanation is that dysbiosis may lead to α-GPC being metabolized into trimethylamine (TMA) in the gastrointestinal tract, and then to trimethylamine N-oxide (TMAO) in the liver, which has implications for cardiovascular health. However, they also noted that the study could be influenced by confounding variables, as α-GPC is often prescribed to individuals with preexisting health risks.

A later systematic review and meta-analysis criticized the statistical analysis of the South Korean cohort study, describing it as questionable and imprecise. The review concluded that α-GPC has a favorable safety and tolerability profile and is effective in improving cognitive function and daily living in patients with dementia disorders of neurological origin, adult-onset vascular dementia, and Alzheimer’s disease.
