= Vesicular monoamine transporter =

Family of transport proteins

The vesicular monoamine transporter (VMAT) is a transport protein integrated into the membranes of synaptic vesicles of presynaptic neurons. It transports monoamine neurotransmitters – such as dopamine, serotonin, norepinephrine, epinephrine, and histamine – into the vesicles, which release the neurotransmitters into synapses, as chemical messages to postsynaptic neurons. VMATs utilize a proton gradient generated by V-ATPases in vesicle membranes to power monoamine import.

Pharmaceutical drugs that target VMATs have possible applications for many conditions, leading to a plethora of biological research, including hypertension, drug addiction, psychiatric disorders, Parkinson's disease, and other neurological disorders. Many drugs that target VMATs act as inhibitors and alter the kinetics of the protein. Much research regarding the effects of altered VMATs on biological systems is still ongoing.

== Monoamines ==
Monoamines transported by VMATs are mainly noradrenaline, adrenaline, dopamine, serotonin, histamine, and trace amines. Exogenous substrates include guanethidine and MPP^{+}.

== Discovery ==
VMAT research began in 1958 when Nils-Åke Hillarp discovered secretory vesicles. In the 1970s, scientists like Arvid Carlsson recognized the need to understand how transport systems and ion gradients work in different organisms in order to explore new treatment options such as reserpine (RES). Researchers discovered inhibitors that blocked the uptake of neurotransmitters into vesicles, suggesting the existence of VMATs. A decade later, molecular genetic tools have improved methods for protein identification. Scientists have used these tools to analyze DNA and amino acid sequences, and discovered that transporters in bacteria and humans were very similar, which emphasized the importance and universality of transporters. The transporters were first structurally identified by cloning VMATs in rats. The VMAT were first isolated and purified in bovine chromaffin granules, in both its native and denatured forms.

== Location ==
There are two types of VMATs expressed in humans: VMAT1 and VMAT2. VMAT1 is expressed mainly in large dense-core vesicles (LDCVs) of the peripheral nervous system. VMAT1 may be found in neuroendocrine cells, particularly chromaffin and enterochromaffin granules, which are primarily found in the medulla of the adrenal glands.

VMAT2 favors expression in a variety of monoaminergic cells of the central nervous system, such as the brain, sympathetic nervous system, mast cells, and cells containing histamine in the gut. It is prevalent in β-cells, expressed in blood platelets, and co-expressed in chromaffin cells. Expression of the two transporters in internal organs seems to differ between species: only VMAT1 is expressed in rat adrenal medulla cells, whereas VMAT2 is the major transporter in bovine adrenal medulla cells.

== Structure and function ==
A Hydrogen atom from the inside of the vesicle binds, inducing a conformational change in the transporter

The conformational change induced by the hydrogen atom binding enables the monoamine binding to the active transport site

A second hydrogen atom binds from inside the vesicle to the transporter inducing another change

The monoamine is released inside the vesicle and the two hydrogen atoms are released into the cytosol and the transport process starts over again.

VMAT1 and VMAT2 are acidic glycoproteins with a molecular weight of approximately 70 kDa. Both isoforms are transmembrane proteins with 12 transmembrane domains (TMDs).

VMATs function by loading monoamines—dopamine, serotonin, histamine, norepinephrine, and epinephrine—into transport vesicles. VMATs use the same transport mechanism for all types of monoamines, and transport them from the cytosol into high-concentration storage vesicles. Transport vesicles are released into the space between neurons, called the synaptic cleft, where they convey a chemical message to the next neuron. VMATs also function in sorting, storing, and releasing neurotransmitters, and are believed to participate in protecting these neurotransmitters from autoxidation. The transporters are also known to continue biochemical modification after loading certain neurotransmitters.

Vesicle packing requires a large energy source to store large quantities of neurotransmitters into a small vesicular space at high concentrations. VMAT transport relies on the pH and electrochemical gradient generated by a vesicular H^{+}-ATPase. The current model of VMAT function proposes that the efflux of two protons (H^{+}) against the H^{+} gradient is coupled with influx of one monoamine. The first H^{+} efflux generates a transporter conformation associated with a high-affinity amine-binding site in the cytosolic phase, and the second H^{+} efflux is coupled with a second large conformational change that leads to amine transport from the cytosolic side into the vesicle, reducing amine-binding affinity.

Studies indicate that the amino acid residue His419, located on the domain between TMDs X and XI of rat VMAT1, plays a role in energy coupling to the amine transport by assisting the first proton-dependent conformational change. It has been proposed that RES inhibits VMAT by interacting with this conformation.

VMAT gene sequence analysis demonstrates that four aspartic acid residues in the middle region of TMDs I, VI, X, and XI and one lysine residue in TMD II have highly conserved gene sequences, suggesting these residues play a critical role in transporter structure and function. Specifically, the residues Lys139 and Asp427 are thought to compose an ion pair that promotes high-affinity interaction with VMAT substrates and inhibitors. The Asp431 residue located in TMD XI is believed to be critical for amine transport, but does not interact with RES binding; it is thought to complete the substrate transport cycle.

== Kinetics ==
VMATs have a relatively low V_{max}, with an estimated rate of 5–20/sec depending on the substrate. Vesicle filling may limit monoamine release from neurons with high rates of firing.

Specific amine-binding affinity varies by VMAT isoform; studies indicate that catecholamines dopamine, norepinephrine, and epinephrine have a threefold higher affinity for VMAT2 than VMAT1 binding and uptake. The imidazoleamine histamine has a thirtyfold higher affinity for VMAT2 compared to VMAT1, and is thought to bind to a different site than other monoamines. Unlike catecholamines and histamine, the indoleamine serotonin binds to VMAT1 and VMAT2 with a similar affinity for both transporter isoforms.

VMAT1 has a lower turnover number and a lower affinity for most monoamine substrates than VMAT2, which may be because of VMAT2's location in the central nervous system, which demands fast recovery from neurotransmitter release in order to prepare for subsequent releases. The uptake efficiencies of each VMAT substrate can be ranked in order of efficiency as: serotonin, dopamine, epinephrine, and norepinephrine.

Methamphetamines decrease V_{max}, while cocaine increases V_{max} reversibly in rat brain.

== Inhibition ==
The effects of VMAT inhibition have been studied in-depth in animal models. Mutant homozygous VMAT(-/-) mice move little, feed poorly, and die within a few days of birth.

More specifically, inhibition of VMAT2 may cause an increase in cytosolic catecholamine levels, which can result in an increase in efflux of catecholamines through the cell membrane, depleting catecholamine concentrations and causing increased oxidative stress and oxidative damage to the neuron.

Heterozygous VMAT mutants display hypersensitivity to amphetamine, cocaine, and MPTP (1-methyl-4-phenyl-1,2,3,6-tetrahydropyridine), the latter being a substance causally linked to Parkinson's disease (PD) in rodents. This suggests a protective role of VMATs against oxidative stress through removal of such substances from the cytosol.

VMAT inhibitors include:

- Reserpine (RES), bietaserpine, and ketanserin (KET) (potent inhibitors of VMAT2 mediated serotonin transport)
- Tetrabenazine (TBZ) (specific to VMAT2)
- Phenylethylamine
- Amphetamine
- MDMA
- N-Methyl-4-phenylpyridinium (MPP^{+}) (very potent inhibitors of VMAT2 mediated serotonin transport)
- Fenfluramine (specific to VMAT1 )
- Non-hydrolysable GTP-analogue guanylyllimidodiphosphate GMP-P(NH)P (VMAT2 only)

== Binding site structures ==
=== Ligand-binding affinities and structures ===
Two known binding sites for VMAT inhibitors include the RES binding site and the TBZ binding site. Some evidence suggests these two sites may overlap or exist as two separate conformations of the same binding site. VMAT inhibitors tend to fall into two classes: those that interact with the RES binding site and those that interact with the TBZ binding site.

RES, methoxytetrabenazine (MTBZ), and the drug amiodarone bind to the RES binding site. TBZ (also called Nitoman and Xenazine), dihydrotetrabenazine (DTBZOH), ketanserin (KET), and the drug lobeline bind to the TBZ binding site. Amphetamine, methamphetamine and GZ-7931 are also known to interact with VMAT2.

Inhibitor affinity varies among VMAT isoforms. RES and KET have higher inhibitory affinity for VMAT2–mediated 5HT transport than for that of VMAT1; TBZ seems to inhibit VMAT2 exclusively.

The residues asp33 and ser180, 181, and 182 are believed to be involved in substrate recognition, and interact with the protonated amino group and hydroxyl group on the catechol or indole rings.

Cocaine and methylphenidate (MPD, also known as Ritalin and Concerta) are believed to interact with VMAT2 to cause a shift in VMAT2 "from a plasmalemmal membrane-associated fraction to a vesicle-enriched, nonmembrane-associated fraction."

==== RES binding site ====
Consistent with catecholamine-binding affinity, RES has a threefold higher affinity for VMAT2 than for VMAT1. The RES binding site is known to be hydrophobic, which is thought to contribute to ligand binding affinity. Methamphetamine binds to the RES site on VMATs.

The current working model proposes that RES and the substrate bind to a single site in a pH-gradient modulated conformational structure of the transporter. The conformation occurs after the transport of one H^{+} across the membrane and into the vesicle; proton transport drives the substrate recognition site from the lumen to the cytoplasmic surface of the vesicle for RES and substrate binding. Methoxytetrabenazine (MTBZ) may bind to the RES binding site, based on studies indicating that RES significantly inhibited MTBZ-binding. Amiodarone is also believed to inhibit monoamine vesicular uptake by binding to the RES binding site.

==== TBZ binding site ====
TBZ and dihydrotetrabenazine (DTBZOH) are believed to bind to a different binding site from the RES/substrate binding site, or to a different conformation of the RES/substrate binding site. This site is believed to be located at the N-terminus, based on studies done in bovine VMAT2. Tyr434 and asp461 are identified as being responsible for the high-affinity interaction of TBZ, serotonin, and histamine in VMAT2. Unlike methamphetamine, amphetamine binds to the TBZ site on hVMAT2.

Unlike RES inhibition, TBZ inhibition is only affected by very high concentrations of monoamines; however, single injections of RES can inhibit TBZ binding. ketanserin (KET) and lobeline also bind to the TBZ binding site conformation.

=== Glycosylation sites: N- and C-linked terminals ===
Three to four glycosylation sites exist in the vesicular matrix on a loop between TMD I and TMD II. In biology, the vesicle matrix refers to the material or tissue between cells in which more specialized structures are embedded. Two of the glycosylation sites, the N-linked glycosylation terminal and C-linked terminal, are located in the cytosolic portion of the vesicle.

The highest amount of genetic variance between VMAT1 and VMAT2 exists near the N- and C- terminals in the cytosolic phase, and in the glycosylated loop between TMDs I and II.

=== C-terminus and VMAT trafficking cycle ===
Several motifs involved in the VMAT trafficking cycle are believed to be encoded in the C-terminus. A dileucine motif in the C-terminus is required for VMAT2 endocytosis. Studies suggest the acidic residues in the dileucine motif sort VMAT2 away from constitutive secretory vesicles and into the regulated secretory pathway. The hydrophobic residues in the dileucine motif are thought to couple with the acidic residues as a single unit to help sort VMAT2 to large dense course vesicles. Acidic glutamate residues located upstream of the dileucine motif are known to be important for localization of VMAT2 to large dense core vesicles; these residues are also conserved in VMAT1.

== Genetic expression and transporter regulation ==
Although both VMAT1 and VMAT2 are encoded by two different genes, the individual genetic sequences demonstrate high homology. Polymorphisms in VMAT2 that affect regulation and quantitative expression may pose genetic risk factors for PD. A specific VMAT1 gene (SLC18A1) has several associated polymorphisms, which have a locus 8p21.3 that has been strongly connected to schizophrenia susceptibility.

Over-expression of VMAT2 results in increased secretion of neurotransmitter upon cell stimulation. Data suggests that deletion of the VMAT2 genes does not affect the size of small clear-core vesicles.

VMATs may be regulated by changes in transcription, post-transcriptional modifications such as phosphorylation and mRNA splicing of exons, and vesicular transport inactivation facilitated by heterotrimeric G-proteins, which are thought to be possessed by chromaffin granules, and have shown to regulate small clear-core vesicles.

Specific heterotrimeric G-protein type regulation is tissue-dependent for VMAT2; it is not known whether this is the case for VMAT1. Heterotrimeric G-protein Gαo2 decreases VMAT1 activity in pancreatic and adrenal medulla cells, and activates heterotrimeric G-proteins to inhibit VMAT2 activity in the brain, regardless of whether they are localized on small clear-core or large-dense-core vesicles. The activated heterotrimeric G-protein Gαq downregulates VMAT2-mediated serotonin transport in blood platelets, but not in the brain, where Gαq completely inhibits VMAT2 activity. Although the exact signalling pathway for G-protein mediated regulation of VMATs is not known, it has recently been described that implicated G-proteins act directly on the VMATs.

== Clinical significance ==
VMAT2 has been shown to contribute to many clinical neurological disorders including drug addiction, mood disorders, and stress, as well as Parkinson's disease and Alzheimer's disease.

=== Parkinson's disease ===
Studies indicate VMAT2 mRNA is present in all cell groups damaged by Parkinson's disease (PD); these findings have identified VMAT2 as a target for preventing Parkinson's. VMAT2 presence does not independently protect neurons from PD, but a decrease in VMAT2 expression has been shown to correlate with susceptibility to the disease, which may be due to a ratio between the dopamine transporter and VMAT2.

Based on the understanding the increased cytosolic dopamine levels lead to dopaminergic cell death in PD, it has been proposed that regulatory polymorphisms in VMAT2 affect VMAT2 quantitative expression, and may serve as a genetic risk factor for PD. Specifically, the SLC18A2 promoter region for the VMAT2 gene has been identified as an area where several polymorphisms form discrete haplotypes.

=== Mood disorders ===
Studies using a genetic rodent model to understand clinical depression in humans suggest that VMAT2 genetic or functional alterations may be involved in depression. Reduced VMAT2 levels were identified in specific subregions of the striatum involved in clinical depression, including the nucleus accumbens shell but not the core, the ventral tegmental area, and the substantia nigra's pars compacta. The reduced VMAT2 protein levels were not accompanied by similar levels of VMAT2 mRNA alterations. Based on these findings, it has been proposed that VMAT2 activity is not altered at the level of genetic expression, but may be altered at the functional level in ways that may correlate with clinical depression.

=== Drug addiction ===
Many psychostimulant drugs are known to interact with VMAT, including amphetamine analogs such as methamphetamine, cocaine, and ecstasy (MDMA).

== Pharmacology ==
VMAT inhibitors tend to fall into two classes; those that interact with the RES binding site and those that interact with the TBZ binding site.

RES, methoxytetrabenazine, and amiodarone bind to the RES binding site.

TBZ, DTBZOH, ketanserin, and lobeline bind to the TBZ binding site.

Many psychostimulants, including substituted amphetamines and cocaine, are known to interact with VMAT2. Studies indicate that both amphetamines and cocaine act to increase non-exocytotic release of dopamine in specific regions of the brain by interacting directly with VMAT2 function.

=== Methamphetamine ===
VMAT is a main target of methamphetamine. Studies indicate that substituted amphetamines including methamphetamine interact with VMAT2 at the TBZ/DTBZOH binding site. By acting as a negative allosteric modulator, methamphetamine blocks the presynaptic cell's ability to use VMAT for vesicular packaging.

Methamphetamine alters the subcellular location of VMAT2, which affects the distribution of dopamine in the cell. Treatment with methamphetamine relocates VMAT2 from a vesicle-enriched fraction to a location that is not continuous with synaptosomal preparations.

Repeated amphetamine exposure may increase VMAT2 mRNA in certain brain regions with little or no decline upon withdrawal from the drug.

A study performed by Sonsalla et al. demonstrated that methamphetamine treatment decreases DHTBZ binding and vesicular dopamine uptake. Another study demonstrated that multiple high doses of methamphetamine removed DTBZ binding sites from the vesicles.

In addition to an interaction with the TBZ/DTBZOH binding site, some researchers propose that substituted amphetamines like methamphetamine decrease dopamine uptake because of the weak base properties of substituted amphetamines. This “Weak Base Hypothesis” proposes that amphetamine analogs enter the cell through transport and lipophilic diffusion, then diffuses through the vesicular membrane where they accumulate in synaptic vesicles and offset the proton electrochemical gradient in the vesicle that drives monoamine transport through VMAT. Amphetamine administration would prevent vesicular dopamine uptake through VMAT, and explain the finding that amphetamine administration correlates with decreased dopamine release from vesicles and a neurotoxic increase in intracellular dopamine.

=== Cocaine ===
Unlike methamphetamine, cocaine interacts with VMAT2 by mobilizing VMAT2-expressing vesicles, causing a shift in VMAT2 proteins from a plasmalemmal (synaptosomal) membrane fraction to a vesicle-enriched fraction that is not associated with the synaptosomal membrane and not retained in synaptosomal preparations. Methylphenidate is believed to interact with VMAT2 in a similar fashion.

In addition to mobilizing VMAT2-expressing vesicles, cocaine has been shown to increase the V_{max} of VMAT2 for dopamine and increase the number of DTBZ binding sites. It has also mobilized a synapsin-dependent reserve pool of dopamine-containing synaptic vesicles, which interacts with the vesicular trafficking cycle to increase dopamine release.

Short-term exposure to cocaine increases VMAT2 density in the prefrontal cortex and striatum of mammalian brains. This is theorized to be a defensive mechanism against the depletive effects cocaine has on cytosolic dopamine through increasing monoamine storage capacity. Chronic cocaine use has been implicated with a reduction in VMAT2 immunoreactivity as well as a decrease in DTBZOH binding in humans.

Research suggests a decline in VMAT2 protein through prolonged cocaine use could play an important role in the development of cocaine-induced mood disorders.

=== MDMA ===
MDMA is known to affect serotonergic neurons, but has been shown to inhibit synaptosomal and vesicular uptake of serotonin and dopamine to roughly the same extent in vitro. In vivo studies indicate short-term MDMA exposure causes short-term reduction in VMAT2 activity, which is reversed after 24 hours.

== Current research ==
=== Clinical research ===
Genetic research models have shown that polymorphisms in SLC18A1 and SLC18A2, the genes that encode for VMAT1 and 2 proteins, respectively, may confer risk for some neuropsychiatric disorders; however, no specific diseases have been identified yet as directly resulting from a genetic mutation in an SLC18 gene, which codes for VMAT proteins.

Much of the current research related to VMAT explores the genetic underpinnings of neuropsychiatric disorders as they may be affected by SLC18A family mutations.

The dopaminergic neuron is known to play a central role in drug addiction and abuse and the potential role of the dopamine transporter has been well-explored as a target for amphetamine and cocaine. Current research looks toward VMAT2 as a target for such psychostimulants. A combination of imaging, neurochemical, biochemical, cell biological, genetic, and immunohistochemical evidence has been compiled to provide the most current comprehensive understanding of the role the VMAT2 plays in amphetamine and cocaine abuse and addiction through aminergic neurotransmission.

As VMATs are membrane proteins, structural information is limited and researchers have yet to completely understand the structure of both isoforms. Further studies are needed in order to determine the structure and therefore complete function of these proteins. There is preliminary evidence that the gene for VMAT1 may be linked to susceptibility to schizophrenia, bipolar disorder, and various anxiety disorders. Further studies are needed in order to confirm these findings and to gain a better understanding of the role of VMATs in the central nervous system.

Multiple single-nucleotide polymorphisms (SNPs) have been identified in the coding region of VMATs. The effects of some of these SNPs have been alteration of VMAT function, structure and regulation. Further investigation of these SNPs is required in order to distinguish whether they may be attributable to certain diseases with suspected SNP-mutation origins.

α-synuclein, a cytosolic protein found mainly in pre-synaptic nerve terminals, has been found to have regulatory interactions with the trafficking of VMATs; mutations involving α-synuclein have been linked to familial PD. Further research is needed to clarify the extent to which these proteins modulate the trafficking of VMATs, and whether they may be exploited in order to gather more information about the exact mechanism of how disorders such as PD occurs, and how they may potentially be treated.

Studies have shown that at the synaptic membrane, enzymes responsible for the synthesis of dopamine, tyrosine hydroxylase and amino acid aromatic decarboxylase are physically and functionally coupled with VMAT2. It was initially thought that the synthesis of these substances and the subsequent packaging of them into vesicles were two entirely separate processes.

=== Animal research ===
Current research related to VMAT uses VMAT2 knockout mice to explore the behavioral genetics of this transporter in an animal model. VMAT2 knockouts are known to be lethal as homozygotes, but heterozygote knockouts are not lethal and are used in many studies as a durable animal model.

From knockout and knockdown mice, researchers have discovered that it is good to have over-expression or under-expression of the VMAT genes in some circumstances. Mice are also used in drug studies, particularity studies involving the effect cocaine and methamphetamine have on VMATs. Studies involving animals have prompted scientists to work on developing drugs that inhibit or enhance the function of VMATs. Drugs that inhibit VMATs may have use in addiction but further studies are needed. Enhancing the function of VMATs may also have therapeutic value.
