= Robert Wilkin =

Robert Wilkin may refer to:

- Robert Nugen Wilkin (1886–1973), United States federal judge
- Robert Wilkin (politician) (1820–1886), New Zealand politician

== See also ==
- Robert Wilkins (disambiguation)
