= Tirilazad =

Chemical compound

Clinical data
- Other names: (8S,10S,13S,14S,16R,17S)-17-[2-[4-(2,6-dipyrrolidin-1-ylpyrimidin-4-yl)piperazin-1-yl]acetyl]-10,13,16-trimethyl-6,7,8,12,14,15,16,17-octahydrocyclopenta[a]phenanthren-3-one
- ATC code: N07XX01 (WHO)

Identifiers
- IUPAC name: (16α)-21-[4-(2,6-dipyrrolidin-1-ylpyrimidin-4-yl)piperazin-1-yl]-16-methylpregna-1,4,9(11)-triene-3,20-dione
- CAS Number: 110101-66-1
- PubChem CID: 104903
- ChemSpider: 94673
- UNII: YD064E883I
- KEGG: D08606
- ChEMBL: ChEMBL1630578
- CompTox Dashboard (EPA): DTXSID30869521

Chemical and physical data
- Formula: C_{38}H_{52}N_{6}O_{2}
- Molar mass: 624.874 g·mol^{−1}
- 3D model (JSmol): Interactive image
- SMILES: O=C(CN4CCN(c2nc(nc(N1CCCC1)c2)N3CCCC3)CC4)[C@H]6[C@H](C)C[C@H]5[C@H]8C(=C/C[C@@]56C)\[C@]/7(/C=C\C(=O)\C=C\7CC8)C
- InChI: InChI=1S/C38H52N6O2/c1-26-22-31-29-9-8-27-23-28(45)10-12-37(27,2)30(29)11-13-38(31,3)35(26)32(46)25-41-18-20-43(21-19-41)34-24-33(42-14-4-5-15-42)39-36(40-34)44-16-6-7-17-44/h10-12,23-24,26,29,31,35H,4-9,13-22,25H2,1-3H3/t26-,29-,31+,35-,37+,38+/m1/s1; Key:RBKASMJPSJDQKY-RBFSKHHSSA-N

Tirilazad is a drug that has been proposed to treat acute ischaemic stroke. When tested on animal models, tirilazad protects brain tissue, and reduces brain damage. However, the drug failed to demonstrate efficacy in humans and may even worsen stroke-related outcomes.

Tirilazad is a 21-aminosteroid and belongs to the "lazaroid" family of agents. The metabolite of tirilazad is called U-89678. Other known lazaroids include: U-74389G, U-74500, U-75412E, and U-87999. The name comes from Lazarus — the biblical figure raised from the dead — because these compounds were thought to “bring cells back to life” after oxidative injury.

More recently, tirilazad has shown some promising results in treating traumatic brain injury (TBI).

== Synthesis ==
The chemical synthesis has been reported:
Patent (Example 83; S22 page 59, A22 page 47): Precursor patent:

- The starting material is called 21-Hydroxypregna-1,4,9(11),16-tetraene-3,20-dione 21-acetate [37413-91-5] (1). Soft addition of methylmagnesium chloride in the presence copper propionate (c.f. Gilman reagent), followed by saponification of the ester group furnished 21-Hydroxy-16alpha-methylpregna-1,4,9(11)-triene-3,20-dione [56016-90-1] (2). FGI of the hydroxy group to the tosyl leaving group, followed by displacement with sodium iodide led to 21-Iodo-16alphamethylpregna-1,4,9(11)-triene-3,20-dione, PC14878745 (3).
- The reaction of 2,4,6-Trichloropyrimidine [3764-01-0] (4) with 2 equivalents of Pyrrolidine [123-75-1] (5) gave 4-chloro-2,6-di(pyrrolidin-1-yl)pyrimidine [111669-15-9] (6). Further reaction of the remaining halogen with piperidine [110-89-4] (7) yielded 4-(Piperazin-1-yl)-2,6-di(pyrrolidin-1-yl)pyrimidine [111641-17-9] (8).
- Convergent synthesis between 3 and 8 completed the synthesis of tirilazad (9).

The precursor 4-chloro-2,6-di(pyrrolidin-1-yl)pyrimidine [111669-15-9] (6) finds dual use in the synthesis of 2-MAC (U-78517F) [122003-11-6] as well as for U-83836E (PNU-83836E or GNF-Pf-3881) [137018-55-4]. These agents show similar antiinflammatory/antioxidant activity to lazaroids but are not related to steroid hormones.
