= Tardive dyskinesia =

Neurological disorder featuring involuntary, repetitive body movements

- Other names: Linguofacial dyskinesia, tardive dystonia, tardive oral dyskinesia
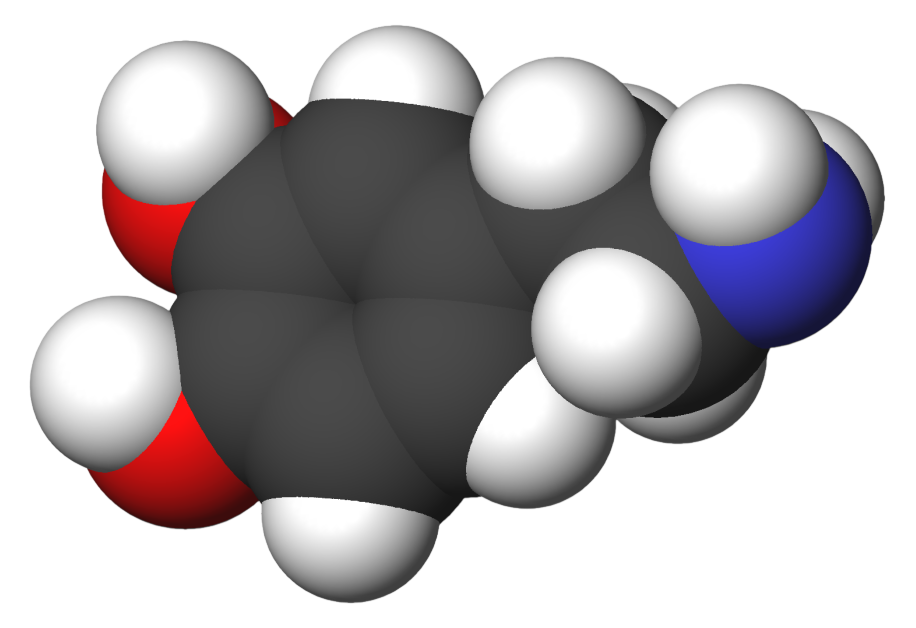
- Tardive dyskinesia is believed to involve the neurotransmitter dopamine.
- Pronunciation: /ˈtɑːrdɪv ˌdɪskɪˈniːʒə/, /tɑːrdaɪv/ /ˌdɪskəˈniːʒə/
- Specialty: Neurology, psychiatry
- Symptoms: Involuntary, repetitive body movements
- Causes: Neuroleptic medications (antipsychotics), metoclopramide
- Diagnostic method: Based on symptoms after ruling out other potential causes
- Differential diagnosis: Huntington's disease, cerebral palsy, Tourette syndrome, dystonia
- Prevention: Using lowest possible dose of neuroleptic medication
- Treatment: Stopping neuroleptic medication if possible, switching to clozapine
- Prognosis: Variable
- Frequency: 20% (atypical antipsychotics); 30% (typical antipsychotics)

Tardive dyskinesia (TD) is an iatrogenic disorder that results in involuntary repetitive body movements, which may include grimacing, sticking out the tongue or smacking the lips, which occurs following treatment with medication. Additional motor symptoms include chorea or athetosis. In about 20% of people with TD, the disorder interferes with daily functioning. If TD is present in the setting of a long-term drug therapy, reversibility can be determined primarily by severity of symptoms and how long symptoms have been present before the long-term drug has been stopped.

Tardive dyskinesia occurs as a result of long-term use of dopamine-receptor-blocking medications such as antipsychotics and metoclopramide. These medications are usually used for mental illness but may also be given for gastrointestinal or neurological problems. The condition typically develops only after months to years of use. The diagnosis is based on the symptoms after ruling out other potential causes.

Efforts to prevent the condition include either using the lowest possible dose or discontinuing use of antipsychotics. Treatment includes stopping the antipsychotic medication if possible (although this may temporarily worsen symptoms) or switching to clozapine. Other medications such as valbenazine, tetrabenazine, or botulinum toxin may be used to lessen the symptoms. With treatment, some see a resolution of symptoms, while others do not.

Rates in those on atypical antipsychotics are about 20%, while those on typical antipsychotics have rates of about 30%. The risk of acquiring the condition is greater in older people, for women, as well as patients with mood disorders and/or medical diagnoses receiving antipsychotic medications. The term tardive dyskinesia first came into use in 1964.

== Signs and symptoms ==
Tardive dyskinesia is characterized by repetitive, involuntary movements, which occurs following treatment with medication. Some examples of these types of involuntary movements include:

- Grimacing
- Tongue movements
- Lip smacking
- Lip puckering
- Pursing of the lips
- Excessive eye blinking
- Rapid, involuntary movements of the limbs, torso, and fingers may also occur.

In some cases, an individual's legs can be so affected that walking becomes difficult or impossible. These symptoms are the opposite of those present in people diagnosed with Parkinson's disease. People with Parkinson's have difficulty moving, whereas people with tardive dyskinesia have difficulty not moving.

Respiratory irregularity, such as grunting and difficulty breathing, is another symptom associated with tardive dyskinesia, although studies have shown that the rate of people affected is relatively low.

Tardive dyskinesia is often misdiagnosed as a mental illness rather than a neurological disorder, and as a result, people are prescribed Antipsychotic drugs, which increase the probability that the person will develop a severe and disabling case, and shortening the typical survival period.

Other closely related neurological disorders have been recognized as variants of tardive dyskinesia. Tardive dystonia is similar to standard dystonia but permanent. Tardive akathisia involves painful feelings of inner tension and anxiety and a compulsive drive to move the body. In some extreme cases, afflicted individuals experience so much internal tension that they lose their ability to sit still. Tardive tourettism is a tic disorder featuring the same symptoms as Tourette syndrome. The two disorders are extremely close in nature and often can only be differentiated by the details of their respective onsets. Tardive myoclonus, a rare disorder, presents as brief jerks of muscles in the face, neck, trunk, and extremities.

"AIMS Examination": This test is used when psychotropic medications have been prescribed because people sometimes develop tardive dyskinesia due to prolonged use of antipsychotic medications. The Abnormal Involuntary Movement Scale (AIMS) examination is a test used to identify the symptoms of tardive dyskinesia (TD). The test is not meant to tell whether there is an absence or presence of tardive dyskinesia. It just scales to the level of symptoms indicated by the actions observed. The levels range from none to severe. The AIMS examination was constructed in the 1970s to measure involuntary facial, trunk, and limb movements. It is best to do this test before and after the administration of the psychotropic drugs. Taking the AIMS consistently can help to track severity of TD over time.

== Causes ==
Tardive dyskinesia was first described in the 1950s shortly after the introduction of chlorpromazine and other antipsychotic drugs. However, the exact mechanism of the disorder remains uncertain. One line of evidence suggests that tardive dyskinesia may result primarily from antipsychotic dopamine supersensitivity in the nigrostriatal pathway, with the D2 dopamine receptor being most affected. Antipsychotics act primarily on this dopamine system, and older antipsychotics, which have greater affinity for the D2 binding site, are associated with high risk for tardive dyskinesia. The D2 hypersensitivity hypothesis is also supported by evidence of a dose–response relationship, withdrawal effects, studies on D2 agonists and antagonists, animal studies, and genetic polymorphism research. However, the time-course of tardive dyskinesia and its increased prevalence in older populations and drug and alcohol users suggest that dopamine supersensitivity is not a complete explanation. Oxidative stress is another causal explanation that accounts for the deficits in the dopamine supersensitivity hypothesis.

Given similar doses of the same antipsychotic, differences among individuals still exist in the likelihood of developing tardive dyskinesia. Such individual differences may be due to genetic polymorphisms, which code for D2 receptor binding site affinity, or prior exposure to environmental toxins. Decreased functional reserve or cognitive dysfunction, associated with aging, intellectual disability, alcohol and drug use, or traumatic head injuries, has also been shown to increase risk of developing the disorder among those treated with antipsychotics. Antipsychotic drugs can sometimes camouflage the signs of tardive dyskinesia from occurring in the early stages; this can happen from the individual having an increased dose of an antipsychotic drug. Often the symptoms of tardive dyskinesia are not apparent until the individual comes off of the antipsychotic drugs; however, when tardive dyskinesia worsens, the signs become visible.

Other dopamine antagonists and antiemetics can cause tardive dyskinesia, such as metoclopramide and promethazine, used to treat gastrointestinal disorders. Atypical antipsychotics are considered lower-risk for causing TD than their typical counterparts, with incidence rates of 13.1% and 32.4% respectively in short-term trials primarily utilising haloperidol as the typical antipsychotic. Quetiapine and clozapine are considered the lowest risk agents for precipitating TD. From 2008, there have been reported cases of the anti-psychotic medication aripiprazole, a partial agonist at D2 receptors, leading to tardive dyskinesia. As of 2013, reports of tardive dyskinesia in aripiprazole have grown in number. The available research seems to suggest that the concurrent prophylactic use of an antipsychotic and an antiparkinsonian drug is useless to avoid early extrapyramidal side-effects and may render the person more sensitive to tardive dyskinesia. Since 1973 the use of these drugs has been found to be associated with the development of tardive dyskinesia.

== Risk factors ==
An increased risk of tardive dyskinesia has been associated with smoking in some studies, although a negative study does exist. There seems to be a cigarette smoke-exposure-dependent risk for TD in people who are antipsychotic-treated. Elderly people are also at a heightened risk for developing TD, as are females and those with organic brain injuries or diabetes mellitus and those with the negative symptoms of schizophrenia. TD is also more common in those that experience acute neurological side effects from antipsychotic drug treatment. Racial discrepancies in TD rate also exist, with Africans and African Americans having higher rates of TD after exposure to antipsychotics. Certain genetic risk factors for TD have been identified including polymorphisms in the genes encoding the D_{3}, 5-HT_{2A} and 5-HT_{2C} receptors.

== Diagnosis ==
Diagnosis is most commonly done by observing the patient's face. The criteria in which a diagnosis is made is usually followed in a step by step process.

== Prevention ==
Prevention of tardive dyskinesia is achieved by using the lowest effective dose of an antipsychotic for the shortest time. However, with diseases of chronic psychosis such as schizophrenia, this strategy must be balanced with the fact that increased dosages of antipsychotics are more beneficial in preventing recurrence of psychosis. If tardive dyskinesia is diagnosed, the causative drug should be discontinued. Tardive dyskinesia may persist after withdrawal of the drug for months, years or even permanently. Some studies suggest that practitioners should consider using atypical antipsychotics as a substitute to typical antipsychotics for people requiring medication. These agents are associated with fewer neuromotor side effects and a lower risk of developing tardive dyskinesia.

Studies have tested the use of melatonin, high dosage vitamins, and different antioxidants in concurrence with antipsychotic drugs (often used to treat schizophrenia) as a way of preventing and treating tardive dyskinesia. Although further research is needed, studies reported a much lower percentage of individuals developing tardive dyskinesia than the current rate of people for those taking antipsychotic drugs. Tentative evidence supports the use of vitamin E for prevention.

== Treatment ==
Valbenazine was approved by the FDA for tardive dyskinesia in April 2017. Tetrabenazine, which is a dopamine depleting drug, is sometimes used to treat tardive dyskinesia and other movement disorders (e.g. Huntington's chorea). Deutetrabenazine, an isotopic isomer of tetrabenazine, was approved by the FDA for tardive dyskinesia in August 2017. Vitamin B_{6} has been reported to be an effective treatment for TD in two randomised double-blind placebo-controlled trials, but the overall evidence for its effectiveness is considered "weak." Clonidine may also be useful in the treatment of TD, although dose-limiting hypotension and sedation may hinder its usage. Botox injections are used for minor focal dystonia, but not in more advanced tardive dyskinesia. As of 2018, evidence is insufficient to support the use of benzodiazepines, baclofen, progabide, sodium valproate, gaboxadol, or calcium channel blockers (e.g. diltiazem).

== Epidemiology ==
Tardive dyskinesia most commonly occurs in people with psychiatric conditions who are treated with antipsychotic medications for many years. The average rate of people affected has been estimated to be around 30% for individuals taking antipsychotic medication, such as that used to treat schizophrenia. A study being conducted at the Yale University School of Medicine has estimated that "32% of people develop persistent tics after 5 years on major tranquilizers, 57% by 15 years, and 68% by 25 years." More drastic data was found during a longitudinal study conducted on individuals 45 years of age and older who were taking antipsychotic drugs. According to this research study, 26% of people developed tardive dyskinesia after just one year on the medication. Another 60% of this at-risk group developed the disorder after 3 years, and 23% developed severe cases of tardive dyskinesia within 3 years. According to these estimates, the majority of people will eventually develop the disorder if they remain on the drugs long enough.

Elderly people are more prone to develop tardive dyskinesia, and elderly women are more at-risk than elderly men. The risk is much lower for younger men and women, and also more equal across the sexes. Several studies have recently been conducted comparing the number of people affected of tardive dyskinesia with second generation, or more modern, antipsychotic drugs to that of first generation drugs. The newer antipsychotics appear to have a substantially reduced potential for causing tardive dyskinesia. However, some studies express concern that the number of people affected has decreased far less than expected, cautioning against the overestimation of the safety of modern antipsychotics.

A practitioner can evaluate and diagnose a person with tardive dyskinesia by conducting a systematic examination. The practitioner should ask the person to relax, and look for symptoms like facial grimacing, eye or lip movements, tics, respiratory irregularities, and tongue movements. In some cases, people experience nutritional problems, so a practitioner can also look for a gain or loss in weight.

Apart from the underlying psychiatric disorder, tardive dyskinesia may lead to the social isolation of people with the condition. It also increases the risk of body dysmorphic disorder (BDD) and can even lead to suicide. Emotional or physical stress can increase the severity of dyskinetic movements, whereas relaxation and sedation have the opposite effect.

== In popular culture ==
In the TV series The Good Wife and The Good Fight, Michael J. Fox, who has Parkinson's disease, plays the lawyer Louis Canning, who has tardive dyskinesia.
