= Parasympathomimetic drug =

Substance that mimics stimulation of cholinergic receptors

A parasympathomimetic drug, sometimes called a cholinomimetic drug or cholinergic receptor stimulating agent, is a substance that stimulates the parasympathetic nervous system (PSNS). These chemicals are also called cholinergic drugs because acetylcholine (ACh) is the neurotransmitter used by the PSNS. Chemicals in this family can act either directly by stimulating the nicotinic or muscarinic receptors (thus mimicking acetylcholine), or indirectly by inhibiting cholinesterase, promoting acetylcholine release, or other mechanisms. Common uses of parasympathomimetics include glaucoma, Sjögren syndrome and underactive bladder.

Some chemical weapons such as sarin or VX, non-lethal riot control agents such as tear gas, and insecticides such as diazinon fall into this category.

== Structure activity relationships for parasympathomimetic drugs ==
For a cholinergic agent, the following criteria describe the structure activity relationship:

1. Ing's Rule of 5: there should be no more than five atoms between the nitrogen and the terminal hydrogen for muscarinic (or cholinergic) activity;
2. the molecule must possess a nitrogen atom capable of bearing a positive charge, preferably a quaternary ammonium salt;
3. for maximum potency, the size of the alkyl groups substituted on the nitrogen should not exceed the size of a methyl group;
4. the molecule should have an oxygen atom, preferably an ester-like oxygen capable of participating in a hydrogen bond;
5. there should be a two-carbon unit between the oxygen atom and the nitrogen atom.

== Pharmaceuticals/Supplements ==
=== Direct-acting ===
These act by stimulating the nicotinic or muscarinic receptors.

- Choline esters
  - Acetylcholine (all acetylcholine receptors)
  - Bethanechol (M3 receptors)
  - Carbachol (all muscarinic receptors and some nicotinic receptors)
  - Methacholine (all muscarinic receptors)
- Plant alkaloids
  - Arecoline
  - Nicotine
  - Muscarine
  - Pilocarpine (M3 receptors)

=== Indirect-acting ===
Indirect acting parasympathomimetic substances may be either reversible cholinesterase inhibitors, irreversible cholinesterase inhibitors or substances that promote ACh release or anti-adrenergics. The latter inhibits the antagonistic system, the sympathetic nervous system.

- Reversible cholinesterase inhibitors
  - Donepezil
  - Edrophonium
  - Neostigmine
  - Physostigmine
  - Pyridostigmine
  - Rivastigmine
  - Tacrine
  - Caffeine (non-competitive)
  - Huperzine A
- Irreversible cholinesterase inhibitors
  - Echothiophate
  - Isoflurophate
  - Malathion
- ACh release promoters
  - Alpha GPC
  - Cisapride
  - Droperidol
  - Domperidone
  - Metoclopramide
  - Risperidone
  - Paliperidone
- Anti-adrenergics: See also alpha blocker and beta blocker
  - Clonidine (α-receptor agonist, α_{2} > α_{1}, giving negative feedback)
  - Methyldopa (α_{2} agonist, giving negative feedback)
  - Propranolol (β-receptor antagonist)
  - Metoprolol (β-receptor antagonist)
  - Atenolol (β_{1} antagonist)
  - Prazosin (α_{1} antagonist)
  - Oxymetazoline (partial α2 adrenergic agonist)

== See also ==
- Sympathomimetic drug
- Sympatholytics
