= Deutetrabenazine =

Chemical compound

Clinical data
- Trade names: Austedo
- Other names: Tetrabenazine D6; SD809; SD-809
- AHFS/Drugs.com: Monograph
- MedlinePlus: a617022
- License data: US DailyMed: Deutetrabenazine
- Pregnancy category: AU: B3
- Routes of administration: By mouth
- ATC code: N07XX16 (WHO)

Legal status
- Legal status: AU: S4 (Prescription only); BR: Class C1 (Other controlled substances); US: ℞-only

Identifiers
- IUPAC name: (3R,11bR)-3-(2-Methylpropyl)-9,10-bis(trideuteriomethoxy)-1,3,4,6,7,11b-hexahydrobenzo[a]quinolizin-2-one
- CAS Number: 1392826-25-3
- PubChem CID: 73437646
- DrugBank: DB12161
- ChemSpider: 34222717
- UNII: P341G6W9NB
- KEGG: D10701

Chemical and physical data
- Formula: C_{19}H_{21}D_{6}NO_{3}
- Molar mass: 323.462 g·mol^{−1}

Deutetrabenazine, sold under the brand names Austedo and Austedo XR, is a vesicular monoamine transporter 2 inhibitor which is used for the treatment of chorea associated with Huntington's disease and tardive dyskinesia.

Chemically, deutetrabenazine is an isotopic isomer of tetrabenazine in which six hydrogen atoms have been replaced by deuterium atoms. The incorporation of deuterium slows the rate of drug metabolism, allowing less frequent dosing.

== Efficacy ==
A study published in June 2017 carried out a review between October 2014 and August 2016 where 298 participants were randomly assigned to receive at least one of the following: one dose of placebo per day, one dose of deutetrabenazine 12 mg/day, one dose of deutetrabenazine 24 mg/day, or one dose of deutetrabenazine 36 mg/day.

From baseline to week 12, the least-squares mean AIMS (Abnormal Involuntary Movement Scale) score improved by −3.3 points in the deutetrabenazine 36 mg/day group, −3.2 points in the 24 mg/day group, −2.1 points in the 12 mg/day group, and −1.4 points in the placebo group. Deutetrabenazine 24 mg/day and 36 mg/day provided a significant reduction in tardive dyskinesia, with favourable safety and tolerability. These findings suggest that dosing regimens could be individualized and tailored for patients on the basis of dyskinesia control and tolerability.

== Pharmacology ==
=== Pharmacodynamics ===
Deutetrabenazine acts as a monoamine-depleting agent.

== History ==
Teva Pharmaceuticals received approval from the Food and Drug Administration to market deutetrabenazine in early 2017, along with five years of orphan drug exclusivity for the treatment of chorea associated with Huntington's disease. It was the first deuterated drug to receive FDA approval.

== Society and culture ==
=== Legal status ===
In June 2025, the Committee for Medicinal Products for Human Use of the European Medicines Agency adopted a positive opinion, recommending the granting of a marketing authorization for the medicinal product Austedo, intended for the treatment of adults with moderate to severe tardive dyskinesia. The applicant for this medicinal product is TEVA GmbH.
