= ATC code N07 =

ATC code N07 Other nervous system drugs is a therapeutic subgroup of the Anatomical Therapeutic Chemical Classification System, a system of alphanumeric codes developed by the World Health Organization (WHO) for the classification of drugs and other medical products. Subgroup N07 is part of the anatomical group N Nervous system.

Codes for veterinary use (ATCvet codes) can be created by placing the letter Q in front of the human ATC code: for example, QN07.
National versions of the ATC classification may include additional codes not present in this list, which follows the WHO version.

== N07A Parasympathomimetics ==
=== N07AA Anticholinesterases ===
N07AA01 Neostigmine
N07AA02 Pyridostigmine
N07AA03 Distigmine
N07AA30 Ambenonium
N07AA51 Neostigmine, combinations

=== N07AB Choline esters ===
N07AB01 Carbachol
N07AB02 Bethanechol

=== N07AX Other parasympathomimetics ===
N07AX01 Pilocarpine
N07AX02 Choline alfoscerate
N07AX03 Cevimeline

== N07B Drugs used in addictive disorders ==
=== N07BA Drugs used in nicotine dependence ===
N07BA01 Nicotine
N07BA03 Varenicline
N07BA04 Cytisinicline

=== N07BB Drugs used in alcohol dependence ===
N07BB01 Disulfiram
N07BB02 Calcium carbimide
N07BB03 Acamprosate
N07BB04 Naltrexone
N07BB05 Nalmefene
N07BB06 Ondelopran

=== N07BC Drugs used in opioid dependence ===
N07BC01 Buprenorphine
N07BC02 Methadone
N07BC03 Levacetylmethadol
N07BC04 Lofexidine
N07BC05 Levomethadone
N07BC06 Diamorphine
N07BC51 Buprenorphine, combinations

== N07C Vertigo preparations ==
=== N07CA Antivertigo preparations ===
N07CA01 Betahistine
N07CA02 Cinnarizine
N07CA03 Flunarizine
N07CA04 Acetylleucine
N07CA52 Cinnarizine, combinations

== N07X Other nervous system drugs ==
=== N07XA Gangliosides and ganglioside derivatives ===
Empty group

=== N07XX Other nervous system drugs ===
N07XX01 Tirilazad
N07XX02 Riluzole
N07XX03 Xaliproden
N07XX04 Sodium oxybate
N07XX05 Amifampridine
N07XX06 Tetrabenazine
N07XX07 Fampridine
N07XX08 Tafamidis
N07XX10 Laquinimod
N07XX11 Pitolisant
N07XX12 Patisiran
N07XX13 Valbenazine
N07XX14 Edaravone
N07XX15 Inotersen
N07XX16 Deutetrabenazine
N07XX17 Arimoclomol
N07XX18 Vutrisiran
N07XX19 Sodium phenylbutyrate and ursodoxicoltaurine
N07XX21 Eplontersen
N07XX22 Tofersen
N07XX23 Troriluzole
N07XX24 Trofinetide
N07XX25 Omaveloxolone
N07XX26 Pridopidine
N07XX27 Levacetylleucine
N07XX59 Dextromethorphan, combinations
