= Ambenonium chloride =

Chemical compound

Clinical data
- AHFS/Drugs.com: Consumer Drug Information
- MedlinePlus: a699058
- Routes of administration: Oral
- ATC code: N07AA30 (WHO)

Pharmacokinetic data
- Bioavailability: Low

Identifiers
- IUPAC name: 2,2'-[(1,2-Dioxoethane-1,2-diyl)diimino]bis[N-(2-chlorobenzyl)-N,N-diethylethanaminium]
- CAS Number: 7648-98-8
- PubChem CID: 8288
- DrugBank: DB01122
- ChemSpider: 7987
- UNII: L16PUN799N
- KEGG: D01001
- ChEBI: CHEBI:2628
- ChEMBL: ChEMBL1652
- CompTox Dashboard (EPA): DTXSID5048396

Chemical and physical data
- Formula: C_{28}H_{42}Cl_{2}N_{4}O_{2}^{+2}
- Molar mass: 537.57 g·mol^{−1}
- 3D model (JSmol): Interactive image
- SMILES: [Cl-].[Cl-].Clc1ccccc1C[N+](CC)(CC)CCNC(=O)C(=O)NCC[N+](Cc2ccccc2Cl)(CC)CC
- InChI: InChI=1S/C28H40Cl2N4O2.2ClH/c1-5-33(6-2,21-23-13-9-11-15-25(23)29)19-17-31-27(35)28(36)32-18-20-34(7-3,8-4)22-24-14-10-12-16-26(24)30;;/h9-16H,5-8,17-22H2,1-4H3;2*1H; Key:DXUUXWKFVDVHIK-UHFFFAOYSA-N

Ambenonium (as ambenonium dichloride, trade name Mytelase) is a cholinesterase inhibitor used in the management of myasthenia gravis.

It is classified as a reversible cholinesterase inhibitor.

== Mechanism of action ==
Ambenonium exerts its actions against myasthenia gravis by competitive reversible inhibition of acetylcholinesterase, the enzyme responsible for the hydrolysis of acetylcholine. Myasthenia gravis occurs when the body produces antibodies against acetylcholine receptors, and thus inhibits signal transmission across the neuromuscular junction. Ambenonium reversibly binds acetylcholinesterase, inactivates it and therefore increases levels of acetylcholine. This, in turn, facilitates transmission of impulses across the myoneural junction and effectively treats the disease.

== Indications ==
Ambenonium is used to treat muscle weakness due to disease or defect of the neuromuscular junction (myasthenia gravis).

Ambenonium was withdrawn from the market in the United States in 2010.
