= Ondelopran =

Opioid antagonist acting at the mu, kappa and delta receptors

Names
- IUPAC name 6-[2-Fluoro-4-[[2-(oxan-4-yl)ethylamino]methyl]phenoxy]pyridine-3-carboxamide

Identifiers
CAS Number	676501-25-0
3D model (JSmol)	Interactive image
ChEMBL	ChEMBL2103878
ChemSpider	8632801
DrugBank	DB12585
KEGG	D10143
PubChem CID	10457387
UNII	4VZT670SD9
- InChI: InChI=1S/C20H24FN3O3/c21-17-11-15(12-23-8-5-14-6-9-26-10-7-14)1-3-18(17)27-19-4-2-16(13-24-19)20(22)25/h1-4,11,13-14,23H,5-10,12H2,(H2,22,25) Key: QWNDOCKIKKQJNN-UHFFFAOYSA-N
- SMILES: C1COCCC1CCNCC2=CC(=C(C=C2)OC3=NC=C(C=C3)C(=O)N)F

Properties
Chemical formula	C_{20}H_{24}FN_{3}O_{3}
Molar mass	373.428 g·mol^{−1}

Pharmacology
ATC code	N07BB06 (WHO)
- Except where otherwise noted, data are given for materials in their standard state (at 25 °C [77 °F], 100 kPa). Infobox references

Ondelopran (LY-2196044) is an experimental drug being investigated for the treatment of alcoholism.

== Mechanism of action ==
Ondelopran appears to be an antagonist at opioid receptors, which means it blocks the action of other opioids (including endogenous opioids like endorphins) by preventing them from binding to the receptor. It antagonizes the three primary opioid receptors with potency of 0.4 (mu), 0.6 (kappa), and 1.9 nM (delta).

== Potential use ==
A study has shown that treatment with ondelopran reduces the amount of alcohol intake (significantly more than in the placebo group), which means it could be a good path for the treatment of alcoholism. Another test also displays more results which go in the same conclusion.
