= CP-615,003 =

Chemical compound

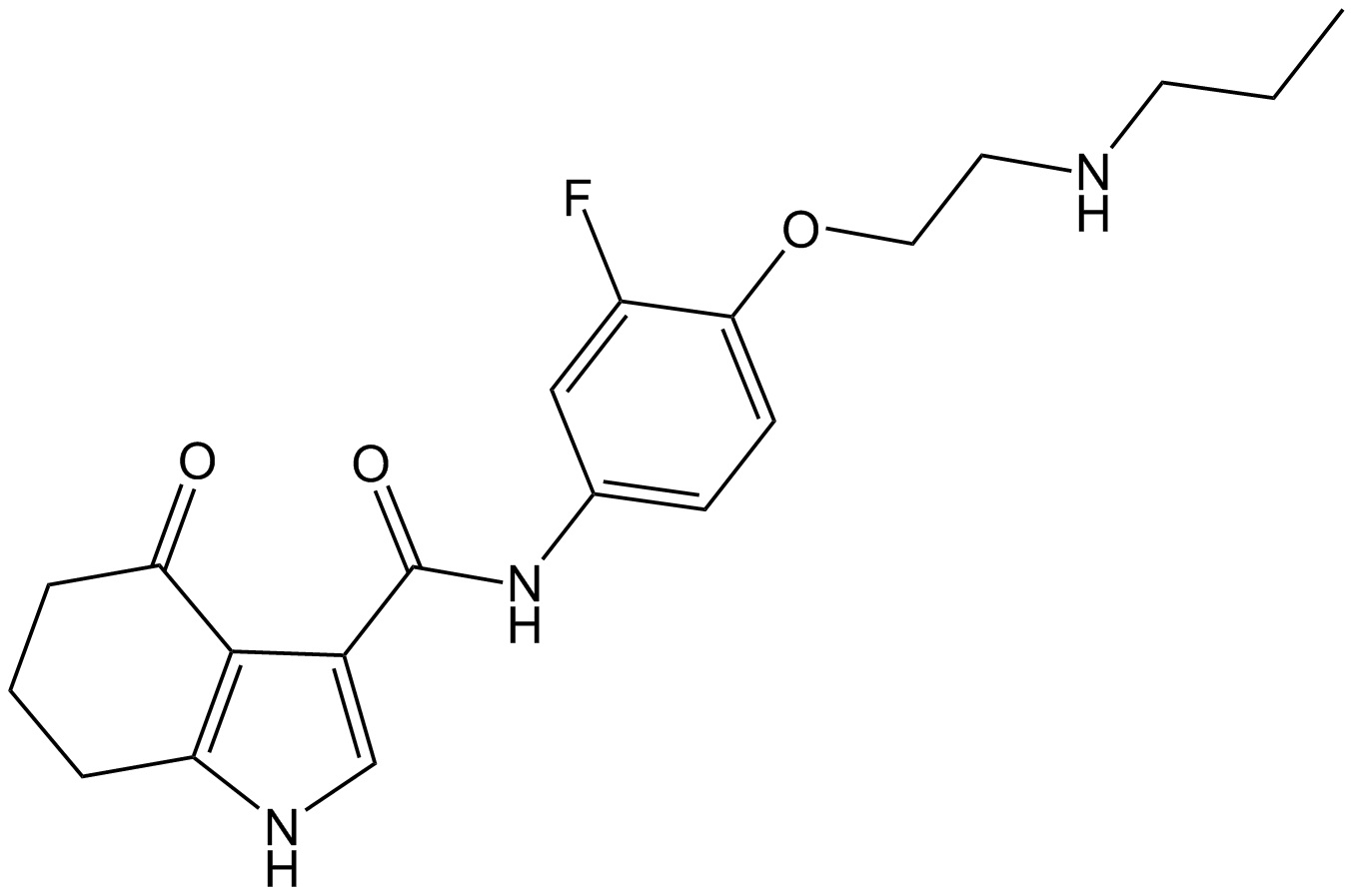

Identifiers
- IUPAC name: N-(3-fluoro-4-(2-(propylamino)ethoxy)phenyl)-4-oxo-4,5,6,7-tetrahydro-1H-indole-3-carboxamide
- CAS Number: 329016-45-7
- PubChem CID: 9820874
- ChemSpider: 7996623
- UNII: F8CYO0R7I1
- CompTox Dashboard (EPA): DTXSID80431338

Chemical and physical data
- Formula: C_{20}H_{24}FN_{3}O_{3}
- Molar mass: 373.428 g·mol^{−1}
- 3D model (JSmol): Interactive image
- SMILES: O=C(NC1=CC=C(OCCNCCC)C(F)=C1)C2=CNC3=C2C(CCC3)=O
- InChI: InChI=1S/C20H24FN3O3/c1-2-8-22-9-10-27-18-7-6-13(11-15(18)21)24-20(26)14-12-23-16-4-3-5-17(25)19(14)16/h6-7,11-12,22-23H,2-5,8-10H2,1H3,(H,24,26); Key:YZHJISPIBWKWGY-UHFFFAOYSA-N

CP-615,003 is a drug which acts as a subtype-selective partial agonist at GABA_{A} receptors, and was developed by Pfizer as a potential anxiolytic; however, poor blood–brain barrier penetration make it primarily useful as a research ligand.
