= Robert Wallace Wilkins =

- Born: December 4, 1906; Chattanooga, Tennessee
- Died: April 9, 2003 (aged 96); Newburyport, Massachusetts
- Education: University of North Carolina; Harvard Medical School (M.D. 1933)
- Known for: hypertension
- Scientific career
- Fields: medicine
- Workplaces: Boston University School of Medicine

Robert Wallace Wilkins (December 4, 1906 – April 9, 2003) was an American medical investigator and educator. He made many contributions in the research of hypertension and cardiovascular disease. He was the president of the American Heart Association in 1957 and received its Gold Heart Award in 1962. Wilkins received the Albert Lasker Award in 1958 for his research.

He has been credited with introducing the antipsychotic and antihypertensive drug reserpine to the United States in 1950.

== Early life and education ==
Wilkins was born in Chattanooga, Tennessee, in 1906. After earning his undergraduate degree from the University of North Carolina, he coached football and track in Greensboro, North Carolina.

He enrolled in medical school at Chapel Hill but transferred to Harvard Medical School, where he graduated at the top of his class in 1933. Afterward, he completed an internship, a residency, and research training at Boston City Hospital's Harvard Service and the Thorndike Memorial Laboratories. He went on to study the autonomic nervous system during a fellowship in London.

== Career ==
In 1938, Wilkins became a faculty member at the Johns Hopkins University School of Medicine, where he studied the circulatory system. His work on circulation, blood pressure, and the body's responses led to his election to the American Society of Clinical Investigation and a new role at the Boston University School of Medicine.

In the 1940s, Wilkins aided the U.S. effort in World War II by developing one of the first G-suits, which fighter pilots and paratroopers used in combat. In 1947, the U.S. Navy and War Department honored Wilkins for the project.

=== Rauwolfia ===
Wilkins' most noteworthy accomplishment may be his work to deploy the herbal medicine rauwolfia in Western clinical settings. Rauwolfia, or the dried Indian snakeroot, had been used to treat mental health conditions, fever, and snake bites in India for hundreds of years. In the early 1950s, Wilkins began using the root to treat patients with hypertension. His work suggested the medication was "effective in lowering both pulse and blood pressure." The investigation included clinical trials for the antipsychotic drug reserpine, a purer derivative of rauwolfia, for the treatment of hypertension. The U.S. Food and Drug Administration approved the use in 1955.
