= Underactive bladder =

Bladder syndrome

- Other names: Detrusor underactivity
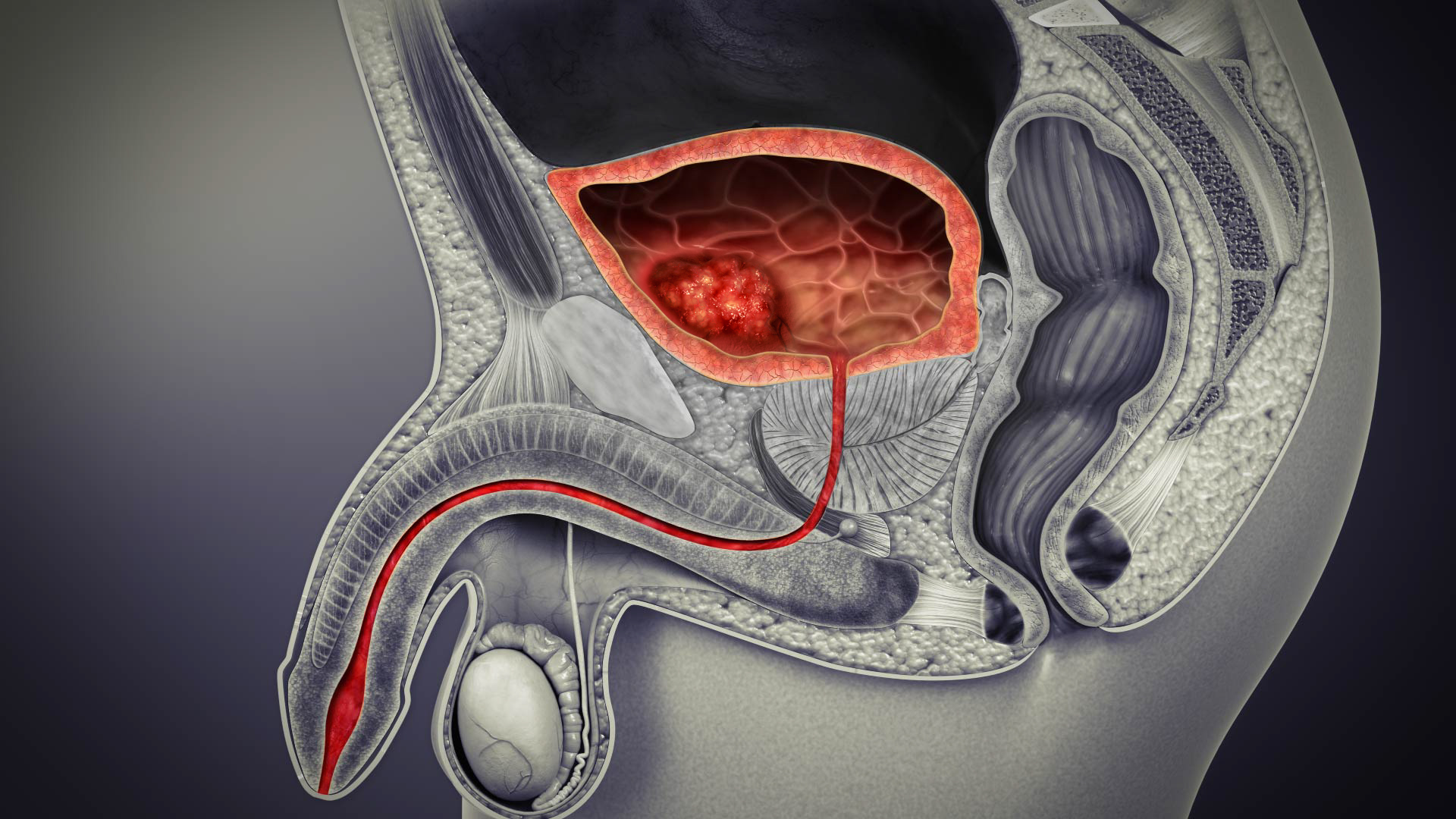
- Male urinary bladder

Underactive bladder syndrome (UAB) describes symptoms of difficulty with bladder emptying, such as hesitancy to start the stream, a poor or intermittent stream, or sensations of incomplete bladder emptying. The physical finding of detrusor activity of insufficient strength or duration to ensure efficient bladder emptying is properly termed "detrusor underactivity" (DU). Historically, UAB and DU (as well as others such as 'bladder underactivity') have been often used interchangeably, leading to both terminologic and pathophysiologic confusion.

Patients with underactive bladder have a diminished sense of bladder filling and consequently are often found to have DU as an underlying finding, however bladder outlet obstruction and less frequently volume hypersensitivity ("OAB") can be associated with UAB symptoms.

== Causes ==
Without diagnostic evaluation, the cause of underactive bladder is unclear, as there are multiple possible causes. UAB symptoms can accurately reflect impaired bladder emptying due either to DU or obstruction (normal or large storage volumes, elevated post-void residual volume), or can result from a sense of incomplete emptying of a hypersensitive bladder (small storage volumes, normal or elevated postvoid residual volume). UAB potentially might also result from inaccurate perceptions of bladder function, such as in neurologic or psychiatric disease. DU itself is often linked to a weak detrusor muscle (impaired contractility), however this association is weak. Both UAB and DU have been associated with diminished sensitivity to bladder volumes rather than objective detrusor weakness, suggesting both symptoms (UAB) and function (DU) have a significant component of sensory dysfunction, leading to impaired bladder sensations and control (Smith et al., 2015).

The underlying contributors to UAB include neurologic disease, metabolic disease (e.g. diabetes), chronic bladder outlet obstruction (e.g. obstructive BPH or complications of anterior vaginal surgery), cognitive decline (such as with aging), psychiatric disorders, and adverse effects of medications. Additionally, structural abnormalities expanding the urinary reservoir beyond the bladder, such as massive vesicoureteral reflux or large bladder diverticulae, can result in UAB. While aging itself is often associated with UAB (and DU), there is scant evidence to support this claim.

== Diagnosis ==
There is no standardized evaluation of the symptoms of UAB, in part due to the historic terminologic confusion. A thorough history aimed at detecting underlying disease or prior pelvic surgeries is certainly necessary. As a perception of volume mishandling, a voiding diary (to assess voided volumes and frequency of voiding) and a post-void residual volume would be valuable information. Uninstrumented uroflow, neurologic and pelvic examination may contribute valuable information. Imaging looking for abnormal bladder morphology or vesicoureteral reflux/hydronephrosis may be helpful. If low-pressure urine storage can be assured, and the urinary reservoir is known to be limited to the bladder, the general value of urodynamic study in UAB is unclear. In specific situations, invasive urodynamics may be helpful to distinguish bladder outlet obstruction from DU, although this distinction can be difficult.

== Treatment ==
Therapy for UAB is often dependent on factors such as age, health, symptoms, and cause of the condition. Treatment frequently includes lifestyle modification (fluid restriction, bladder retraining). Bethanechol is a prescription medication used for treatment, bethanechol can stimulate the nerves of the bladder, making them more responsive to stimulus. In most cases, a class of drugs called 'parasympathomimetics' are the first-line options for pharmaceutical management, however, the evidence surrounding their effectiveness is still developing. With UAB, it is common for patients to utilize a urinary catheter to void. Surgical options are also options, with a cuff or stent placed around or in the neck of the bladder to aid the emptying and leakage of urine. Neuromodulatory techniques such as sacral nerve or posterior tibial nerve stimulation may be of value in selected cases. However, current therapies are considered inadequate and there is a strong need for new research and attention.(Van Koeveringe et al., 2011; Tyagi et al. 2015).

== See also ==
- Urinary retention
- Overactive bladder
- Urinary incontinence
- International Continence Society
