= Vesicular monoamine transporter 1 =

Protein found in humans

SLC18A1

Identifiers
- Aliases: SLC18A1, CGAT, VAT1, VMAT1, Vesicular monoamine transporter 1, solute carrier family 18 member A1, VMAT2
- External IDs: OMIM: 193002; MGI: 106684; GeneCards: SLC18A1

Gene location (Human)
Chr.	Chromosome 8 (human)
Band	8p21.3	Start	20,144,855 bp
Band	8p21.3	End	20,183,206 bp

Gene location (Mouse)
Chr.	Chromosome 8 (mouse)
Band	8 B3.3|8 33.88 cM	Start	69,490,363 bp
Band	8 B3.3|8 33.88 cM	End	69,541,887 bp
RNA expression pattern
Bgee	Human / Mouse (ortholog); Top expressed in: testicle; rectum; monocyte; granulocyte; mucosa of sigmoid colon; right adrenal gland; mucosa of transverse colon; appendix; substantia nigra; duodenum / Top expressed in: right kidney; convoluted tubule; proximal convoluted tubule; interventricular septum; human kidney; proximal straight tubule; gastrula; adrenal gland; stellate ganglion; yolk sac; More reference expression data
BioGPS	n/a
Gene ontology
Molecular function	monoamine transmembrane transporter activity; xenobiotic transmembrane transporter activity; serotonin:sodium symporter activity
Cellular component	integral component of membrane; clathrin-sculpted monoamine transport vesicle membrane; endoplasmic reticulum membrane; membrane; endoplasmic reticulum; cytoplasmic vesicle membrane; cytoplasmic vesicle; integral component of plasma membrane; cell junction; synaptic vesicle membrane; synapse; terminal bouton
Biological process	xenobiotic transmembrane transport; monoamine transport; neurotransmitter transport; aminergic neurotransmitter loading into synaptic vesicle; serotonin transport; transmembrane transport; serotonin uptake; xenobiotic transport
Sources:Amigo / QuickGO
Orthologs
Databases	NCBI: entry; OMA: entry
Species	Human	Mouse
Entrez	6570	110877
Ensembl	ENSG00000036565	ENSMUSG00000036330
UniProt	P54219	Q8R090
RefSeq (mRNA)	NM_001135691; NM_001142324; NM_001142325; NM_003053	NM_153054
RefSeq (protein)	NP_001129163; NP_001135796; NP_001135797; NP_003044	NP_694694
Location (UCSC)	Chr 8: 20.14 – 20.18 Mb	Chr 8: 69.49 – 69.54 Mb
PubMed search
- Wikidata
View/Edit Human	View/Edit Mouse

Vesicular monoamine transporter 1 (VMAT1), also known as chromaffin granule amine transporter (CGAT) or solute carrier family 18 member 1 (SLC18A1), is a protein that in humans is encoded by the SLC18A1 gene. VMAT1 is an integral membrane protein, which is embedded in synaptic vesicles and serves to transfer monoamines, such as norepinephrine, epinephrine, dopamine, and serotonin, between the cytosol and synaptic vesicles. SLC18A1 is an isoform of the vesicular monoamine transporter.

== Discovery ==
The idea that there must be specific transport proteins associated with the uptake of monoamines and acetylcholine into vesicles developed due to the discovery of specific inhibitors which interfered with monoamine neurotransmission and also depleted monoamines in neuroendocrine tissues. VMAT1 and VMAT2 were first identified in rats upon cloning cDNAs for proteins which gave non-amine accumulating recipient cells the ability to sequester monoamines. Subsequently, human VMATs were cloned using human cDNA libraries with the rat homologs as probes, and heterologous-cell amine uptake assays were performed to verify transport properties.

== Structure ==
Across mammalian species, VMATs have been found to be structurally well conserved; VMAT1s have an overall sequence identity exceeding 80%. However, there exists only a 60% sequence identity between the human VMAT1 and VMAT2.

VMAT1 is an acidic glycoprotein with an apparent weight of 40 kDa. Although the crystallographic structure has not yet been fully resolved, VMAT1 is known to have either twelve transmembrane domains (TMDs), based on Kyte-Doolittle hydrophobicity scale analysis or ten TMDs, based on MAXHOM alignment. MAXHOM alignment was determined using the "profile-fed neural network systems from Heidelberg" (PHD) program. The main difference between these two models arises from the placement of TMDs II and IV in the vesicle lumen or the cytoplasm.

== Localization ==
=== Cell types ===
VMATs are found in a variety of cell types throughout the body, however, VMAT1 is found exclusively in neuroendocrine cells, in contrast to VMAT2, which is also found in the PNS and CNS. Specifically, VMAT1 is found in chromaffin cells, enterochromaffin cells, and small intensely fluorescent cells (SIFs). Chromaffin cells are responsible for releasing the catecholamines (norepinephrine and epinephrine) into systemic circulation. Enterochromaffin cells are responsible for storing serotonin in the gastrointestinal tract. SIFs are interneurons associated with the sympathetic nervous system which are managed by dopamine.

=== Vesicles ===
VMAT1 is found in both large dense-core vesicles (LDCVs) as well as in small synaptic vesicles (SSVs). This was discovered via studying rat adrenal medulla cells (PC12 cells). LDCVs are 70-200 nm in size and exist throughout the neuron (soma, dendrites, etc.). SSVs are much smaller (usually about 40 nm) and typically exist as clusters in the presynaptic cleft.

== Function ==
=== Active transport of monoamines ===
==== Driving force ====
An example of secondary active transport

The active transport of monoamines from the cytosol into storage vesicles operates against a large (>10^{5}) concentration gradient. Secondary active transport is the type of active transport used, meaning that VMAT1 is an antiporter. This transport is facilitated via proton gradient generated by the protein proton ATPase. The inward transport of the monoamine is coupled with the efflux of two protons per monoamine. The first proton is thought to cause a change in VMAT1's conformation, which pushes a high affinity amine binding site, to which the monoamine attaches. The second proton then causes a second change in the conformation which pulls the monoamine into the vesicle and greatly reduces the affinity of the binding site for amines. A series of tests suggest that His419, located between TMDs X and XI, plays the key role in the first of these conformational changes, and that Asp431, located on TMD XI, does likewise during the second change.

==== Inhibition ====
Several reuptake inhibitors of VMATs are known to exist, including reserpine (RES), tetrabenazine (TBZ), dihydrotetrabenazine (DTBZOH), and ketanserin (KET). It is thought that RES exhibits competitive inhibition, binding to the same site as the monoamine substrate, as studies have shown that it can be displaced via introduction of norepinephrine. TBZ, DTBZOH, and KET are thought to exhibit non-competitive inhibition, instead binding to allosteric sites and decreasing the activity of the VMAT rather than simply blocking its substrate binding site. It has been found that these inhibitors are less effective at inhibiting VMAT1 than VMAT2, and the inhibitory effects of the tetrabenazines on VMAT1 is negligible.

=== Clinical significance ===
==== Pancreatic cancer ====
The expression of VMAT1 in healthy endocrine cells was compared to VMAT1 expression in infants with hyperinsulinemic hypoglycemia and adults with pancreatic endocrine tumors. Through immunohistochemistry (IHC) and in situ hybridization (ISH), they found VMAT1 and VMAT2 were located in mutually exclusive cell types, and that in insulinomas VMAT2 activity disappeared, suggesting that if only VMAT1 activity is present in the endocrine system, this type of cancer is likely.

==== Digestive system ====
VMAT1 also has effects on the modulation of gastrin processing in G cells. These intestinal endocrine cells process amine precursors, and VMAT1 pulls them into vesicles for storage. The activity of VMAT1 in these cells has a seemingly inhibitory effect on the processing of gastrin. Essentially, this means that certain compounds in the gut can be taken into these G cells and either amplify or inhibit the function of VMAT1, which will impact gastrin processing (conversion from G34 to G17).

Additionally, VMAT1 is known to play a role in the uptake and secretion of serotonin in the gut. Enterochromaffin cells in the intestines will secrete serotonin in response to the activation of certain mechanosensors. The regulation of serotonin in the gut is critically important, as it modulates appetite and controls intestinal contraction.

==== Protection against hypothermia ====
Presence of VMAT1 in cells has been shown to protect them from the damaging effects of cooling and rewarming associated with hypothermia. Experiments were carried out on aortic and kidney cells and tissues. Evidence was found that an accumulation of serotonin using VMAT1 and TPH1 allowed for the subsequent release of serotonin when exposed to cold temperatures. This allows cystathionine beta synthase (CBS) mediated generation of H_{2}S. The protection against the damage caused by hypothermia is due to a reduction in the generation of reactive oxygen species (ROS), which can induce apoptosis, due to the presence of H_{2}S.

==== Mental disorders ====
VMAT1 (SLC18A1) maps to a shared bipolar disorder(BD)/schizophrenia locus, which is located on chromosome 8p21. It is thought that disruption in transport of monoamine neurotransmitters due to variation in the VMAT1 gene may be relevant to the etiology of these mental disorders. One study looked at a population of European descent, examining the genotypes of a bipolar group and a control group. The study confirmed expression of VMAT1 in the brain at a protein and mRNA level, and found a significant difference between the two groups, suggesting that, at least for people of European descent, variation in the VMAT1 gene may confer susceptibility. A second study examined a population of Japanese individuals, one group healthy and the other schizophrenic. This study resulted in mostly inconclusive findings, but some indications that variation in the VMAT1 gene would confer susceptibility to schizophrenia in Japanese women. While these studies provide some promising insight into the cause of some of the most prevalent mental disorders, it is clear that additional research will be necessary in order to gain a full understanding.
