= Dihydrotetrabenazine =

Identifiers
CAS Number	3466-75-9
3D model (JSmol)	Interactive image
ChemSpider	110379
PubChem CID	123836
CompTox Dashboard (EPA)	DTXSID90956148
- InChI: InChI=1S/C19H29NO3/c1-12(2)7-14-11-20-6-5-13-8-18(22-3)19(23-4)9-15(13)16(20)10-17(14)21/h8-9,12,14,16-17,21H,5-7,10-11H2,1-4H3 Key: WEQLWGNDNRARGE-UHFFFAOYSA-N
- SMILES: COC1=C(OC)C=C(C(CC(O)C(CC(C)C)C2)N2CC3)C3=C1

Properties
Chemical formula	C_{19}H_{29}NO_{3}
Molar mass	319.445 g·mol^{−1}
- Except where otherwise noted, data are given for materials in their standard state (at 25 °C [77 °F], 100 kPa). Infobox references

Dihydrotetrabenazine or DTBZ is an organic compound with the chemical formula C_{19}H_{29}NO_{3}. It is a close analog of tetrabenazine. DTBZ and its derivatives, when labeled with positron emitting isotopes such as carbon-11 and fluorine-18, are used as PET radioligands for examining VMAT2.

== Use in Positron Emission Tomography ==
Carbon-11 labeled (+)DTBZ(right) and fluorine-18 labeled fluoropropylated (+)DTBZ(left)

Reconstructed data from PET scan of healthy human brain using [^{18}F]Fluoropropyl-DTBZ indicating VMAT2 distribution

[^{11}C]DTBZ as a PET radioligand with affinity for VMAT2 was developed in the mid 1990s by David E. Kuhl and colleagues at the University of Michigan. There are two enantiomers of alpha-dihydrotetrabenazine, and the dextrorotary(or (+) isomer) has a high affinity of about 1 nanomolar K_{i} whereas the levorotary (or (-) isomer) has approximately 1000 fold lower affinity with a K_{i} of about 2 micromolar.

VMAT2 is a membrane bound protein and a biomarker for Parkinson's disease. Binding of DTBZ to VMAT2 in individuals with Parkinson's disease is significantly reduced. Moreover, the VMAT2 density as determined by [^{18}F]DTBZ has been shown to be well, inversely correlated with the severity of Parkinson's disease.

Avid Radiopharmaceuticals has sponsored clinical trials of [^{18}F]AV-133 (or [^{18}F]Fluoropropyl-(+)-DTBZ) to identify subjects with dopaminergic degeneration.

== See also ==
- Nuclear medicine
- List of PET radiotracers
