= Vesicular monoamine transporter 2 =

Mammalian protein found in Homo sapiens

SLC18A2

Identifiers
- Aliases: SLC18A2, SVAT, SVMT, VAT2, VMAT2, solute carrier family 18 member A2, Vesicular monoamine transporter 2, PKDYS2
- External IDs: OMIM: 193001; MGI: 106677; GeneCards: SLC18A2

Gene location (Human)
Chr.	Chromosome 10 (human)
Band	10q25.3	Start	117,241,093 bp
Band	10q25.3	End	117,279,430 bp

Gene location (Mouse)
Chr.	Chromosome 19 (mouse)
Band	19 D3|19 54.64 cM	Start	59,249,328 bp
Band	19 D3|19 54.64 cM	End	59,284,444 bp
RNA expression pattern
Bgee	Human / Mouse (ortholog); Top expressed in: pars reticulata; pars compacta; secondary oocyte; tibia; testicle; skin of hip; islet of Langerhans; endometrium; gallbladder; ectocervix / Top expressed in: ventral tegmental area; substantia nigra; central gray substance of midbrain; dorsal tegmental nucleus; mammillary body; dorsomedial hypothalamic nucleus; cumulus cell; secondary oocyte; zygote; lateral geniculate nucleus; More reference expression data
BioGPS	n/a
Gene ontology
Molecular function	monoamine transmembrane transporter activity; serotonin:sodium symporter activity
Cellular component	integral component of membrane; clathrin-sculpted monoamine transport vesicle membrane; membrane; plasma membrane; integral component of plasma membrane; cytoplasmic vesicle membrane; cytoplasmic vesicle; synaptic vesicle; dopaminergic synapse; synaptic vesicle membrane; terminal bouton
Biological process	locomotory behavior; response to amphetamine; post-embryonic development; serotonin transport; negative regulation of reactive oxygen species biosynthetic process; dopamine transport; neurotransmitter loading into synaptic vesicle; neurotransmitter transport; response to toxic substance; neurotransmitter secretion; sequestering of neurotransmitter; chemical synaptic transmission; monoamine transport; transmembrane transport; aminergic neurotransmitter loading into synaptic vesicle; serotonin uptake
Sources:Amigo / QuickGO
Orthologs
Databases	NCBI: entry; OMA: entry
Species	Human	Mouse
Entrez	6571	214084
Ensembl	ENSG00000165646	ENSMUSG00000025094
UniProt	Q05940	Q8BRU6
RefSeq (mRNA)	NM_003054	NM_172523
RefSeq (protein)	NP_003045	NP_766111
Location (UCSC)	Chr 10: 117.24 – 117.28 Mb	Chr 19: 59.25 – 59.28 Mb
PubMed search
- Wikidata
View/Edit Human	View/Edit Mouse

Distribution of VMAT2 in the human brain.

The solute carrier family 18 member 2 (SLC18A2) also known as vesicular monoamine transporter 2 (VMAT2) is a protein that in humans is encoded by the SLC18A2 gene. VMAT2 is an integral membrane protein that transports monoamines—particularly neurotransmitters such as dopamine, norepinephrine, serotonin, and histamine—from cellular cytosol into synaptic vesicles. In nigrostriatal pathway and mesolimbic pathway dopamine-releasing neurons, VMAT2 function is also necessary for the vesicular release of the neurotransmitter GABA.

== Binding sites and ligands ==
VMAT2 is believed to possess at least two distinct binding sites, which are characterized by tetrabenazine (TBZ) and reserpine binding to the transporter. Amphetamine (TBZ site) and methamphetamine (reserpine site) bind at distinct sites on VMAT2 to inhibit its function. VMAT2 inhibitors like tetrabenazine and reserpine reduce the concentration of monoamine neurotransmitters in the synaptic cleft by inhibiting uptake through VMAT2; the inhibition of SLC18A2 uptake by these drugs prevents the storage of neurotransmitters in synaptic vesicles and reduces the quantity of neurotransmitters that are released through exocytosis. Although many substituted amphetamines induce the release of neurotransmitters from vesicles through VMAT2 while inhibiting uptake through VMAT2, they may facilitate the release of monoamine neurotransmitters into the synaptic cleft by simultaneously reversing the direction of transport through the primary plasma membrane transport proteins for monoamines (i.e., the dopamine transporter, norepinephrine transporter, and serotonin transporter) in monoamine neurons. Other VMAT2 inhibitors such as GZ-793A inhibit the reinforcing effects of methamphetamine, but without producing stimulant or reinforcing effects themselves.

Researchers have found that inhibiting the dopamine transporter (but not VMAT2) will block the effects of amphetamine and cocaine; while, in another experiment, observing that disabling VMAT2 (but not the dopamine transporter) prevents any notable action in test animals after amphetamine administration yet not cocaine administration. This suggests that amphetamine may be an atypical substrate with little to no ability to prevent dopamine reuptake via binding to the dopamine transporter but, instead, uses it to enter a neuron where it then interacts with VMAT2 to induce efflux of dopamine from their vesicles into the cytoplasm whereupon dopamine transporters with amphetamine substrates attached move this recently liberated dopamine into the synaptic cleft.

Although most amphetamines and other monoamine releasing agents (MRA) act on VMAT2, several MRAs, including phentermine, phenmetrazine, and benzylpiperazine (BZP), are inactive at VMAT2. Others, including cathinones like mephedrone, methcathinone, and methylone, also show only weak VMAT2 activity (e.g., ~10-fold weaker than the corresponding amphetamines). MRAs acting on VMAT2 additionally continue to induce monoamine release in in-vitro systems in which VMAT2 is absent or inhibited.

=== List of VMAT2 inhibitors ===
1. Lobelane
2. Quinlobelane
3. UKCP-110
4. CT-005404
5. GZ-11608
6. 4-Benzyl-1-(3,4-dimethoxyphenethyl)piperidine [15565-25-0]
7. PC118857804
8. Valbenazine
9. Tetrabenazine
10. Deutetrabenazine
11. JPC-141 (PC155541952)
12. arylpiperidinylquinazolines (APQs)
13. Carvedilol

== Inhibition ==
VMAT2 is essential for enabling the release of neurotransmitters from the axon terminals of monoamine neurons into the synaptic cleft. If VMAT2 function is inhibited or compromised, monoamine neurotransmitters such as dopamine cannot be released into the synapse via typical release mechanisms (i.e., exocytosis resulting from action potentials).

In one study, cocaine users with cocaine-induced mood disorders displayed a significant loss of VMAT2; this might reflect damage to dopamine axon terminals in the striatum. These neuronal changes could play a role in causing disordered mood and motivational processes in more severely addicted users.

== Induction ==
To date, no agent has been shown to directly interact with VMAT2 in a way that promotes its activity. A VMAT2 positive allosteric modulator remains an elusive target in addiction and Parkinson's disease research. However, it has been observed that certain tricyclic and tetracyclic antidepressants, as well as a high-mesembrine Sceletium tortuosum extract, can upregulate the activity of VMAT2 in vitro, though whether this is due to a direct interaction is unknown.

== In popular culture ==
Geneticist Dean Hamer has suggested that a particular allele of the SLC18A2 gene correlates with spirituality using data from a smoking survey, which included questions intended to measure "self-transcendence". Hamer performed the spirituality study on the side, independently of the National Cancer Institute smoking study. His findings were published in the mass-market book The God Gene: How Faith Is Hard-Wired into Our Genes. Hamer himself notes that SLC18A2 plays at most a minor role in influencing spirituality. Furthermore, Hamer's claim that the SLC18A2 gene contributes to spirituality is controversial. Hamer's study has not been published in a peer-reviewed journal and a reanalysis of the correlation demonstrates that it is not statistically significant.
