= Octamethylene-bis(5-dimethylcarbamoxyisoquinolinium bromide) =

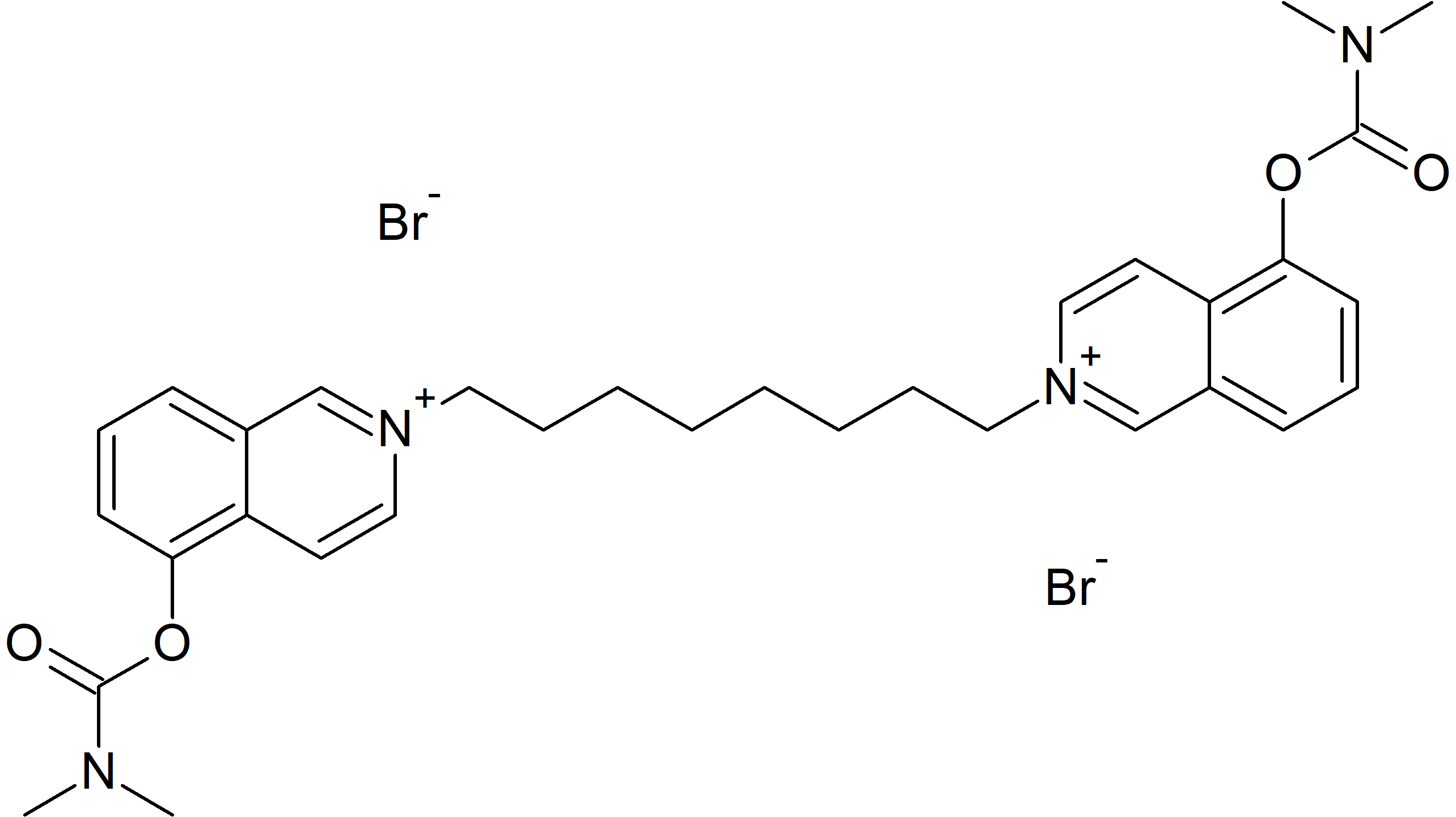

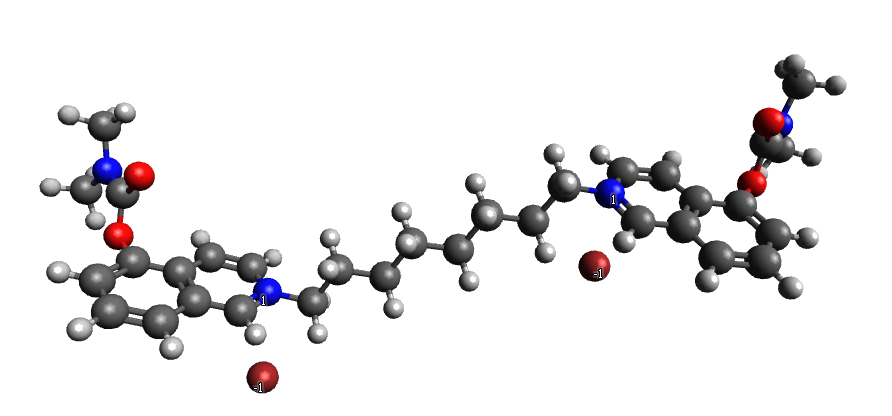

Identifiers
CAS Number	110203-40-2
3D model (JSmol)	Interactive image
- InChI: InChI=1S/C32H40N4O4.2BrH/c1-33(2)31(37)39-29-15-11-13-25-23-35(21-17-27(25)29)19-9-7-5-6-8-10-20-36-22-18-28-26(24-36)14-12-16-30(28)40-32(38)34(3)4;;/h11-18,21-24H,5-10,19-20H2,1-4H3;2*1H/q+2;;/p-2 Key: NJYACOCRVJAADS-UHFFFAOYSA-L
- SMILES: [Br-].[Br-].CN(C)C(=O)Oc1cccc2c1cc[n+](c2)CCCCCCCC[n+]3ccc4c(c3)cccc4OC(=O)N(C)C

Properties
Chemical formula	C_{32}H_{40}Br_{2}N_{4}O_{4}
Molar mass	704.504 g·mol^{−1}
Appearance	Solid
Melting point	121–125 °C (250–257 °F; 394–398 K)
Solubility in water	Soluble
Solubility	Soluble in polar solvents
Vapor pressure	Negligible

Hazards
- Occupational safety and health (OHS/OSH)
Main hazards	Extremely toxic
- Lethal dose or concentration (LD, LC)
LD_{50} (median dose)	16 μg/kg (Mice); 6 μg/kg (Rabbits)
- Except where otherwise noted, data are given for materials in their standard state (at 25 °C [77 °F], 100 kPa). Infobox references

Octamethylene-bis(5-dimethylcarbamoxyisoquinolinium bromide) (4-673-745-01) is an extremely potent carbamate nerve agent. It works by inhibiting acetylcholinesterase, causing acetylcholine to accumulate. Since the agent molecule is positively charged, it does not cross the blood brain barrier very well.

== Toxicity ==
Octamethylene-bis(5-dimethylcarbamoxyisoquinolinium bromide) is an extremely toxic nerve agent that can be lethal even at extremely low doses. The LD_{50} in mice and rabbits is 16 μg/kg and 6 μg/kg, respectively.

== Synthesis ==
5-Hydroxyisoquinoline and dimethylcarbamoyl chloride is heated on a steam bath for 2 hours. The mixture is then cooled and treated with benzene. The resulting solid is then dissolved in water. Sodium hydroxide is added to make the solution basic. The solution is extracted with chloroform and then dried with magnesium sulfate. The solvent is evaporated and the solid residue is then recrystallized from petroleum ether. The resulting product, 5-dimethylcarbamoxyisoquinoline, is then mixed with 1,8-dibromooctane in acetonitrile and refluxed for 8 hours. After cooling, the precipitate is filtered and recrystallized from acetonitrile. The product is then dried in vacuo for 14 hours at room temperature, resulting in the final product.

== See also ==
- EA-3887
- EA-3966
- EA-3990
- EA-4056
- T-1123
- VX (nerve agent)
