= 4-686-293-01 =

Nerve agent

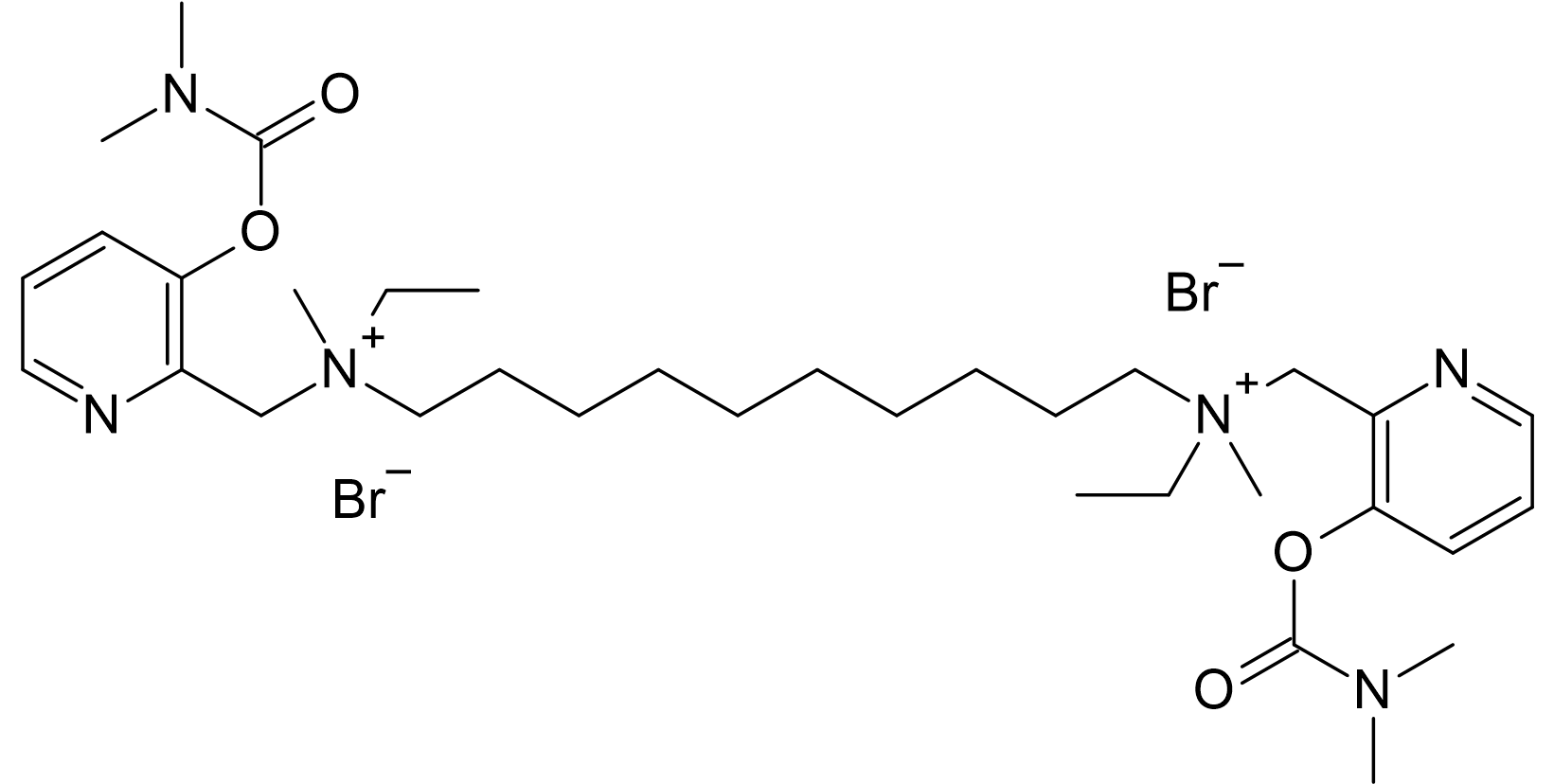

Names
- Preferred IUPAC name N^{1},N^{10}-Bis({3-[(dimethylcarbamoyl)oxy]pyridin-2-yl}methyl)-N^{1},N^{10}-diethyl-N^{1},N^{10}-dimethyldecane-1,10-bis(aminium) dibromide
- Other names Agent 1-10

Identifiers
CAS Number	113402-82-7
3D model (JSmol)	Interactive image
- InChI: InChI=1S/C34H58N6O4.2BrH/c1-9-39(7,27-29-31(21-19-23-35-29)43-33(41)37(3)4)25-17-15-13-11-12-14-16-18-26-40(8,10-2)28-30-32(22-20-24-36-30)44-34(42)38(5)6;;/h19-24H,9-18,25-28H2,1-8H3;2*1H/q+2;;/p-2 Key: MBJLKFXQGQFYSE-UHFFFAOYSA-L
- SMILES: [Br-].[Br-].C[N+](Cc1ncccc1OC(=O)N(C)C)(CC)CCCCCCCCCC[N+](C)(Cc1ncccc1OC(=O)N(C)C)CC

Properties
Chemical formula	C_{34}H_{58}N_{6}O_{4} · Br_{2}
Molar mass	774.678 g/mol
Appearance	white crystalline solid
Melting point	173–176 °C (343–349 °F; 446–449 K)
Solubility	soluble in water and alcohols

Hazards
NFPA 704 (fire diamond)	4 1 1
- Lethal dose or concentration (LD, LC)
LD_{50} (median dose)	11 μg/kg (intravenous, mouse); 4 μg/kg (intravenous, rabbit)
- Except where otherwise noted, data are given for materials in their standard state (at 25 °C [77 °F], 100 kPa). Infobox references

4-686-293-01, also known as Agent 1-10, is a highly potent experimental carbamate nerve agent, patented in May 1967 by the US army. Due to its high molecular weight and thermal stability, it can remain embedded within various surfaces and clothes for prolonged periods of time. The agent can be decontaminated using bleach or hot caustic soda. The main effector pathway is through the inhibition and antagonization of acetylcholinesterase, achieved by the presence of quaternary ammonium groups in the structure. Perceived as one of the most potent agents in chemical warfare - it can be disseminated through aerosols, explosives or smoke generating munitions.

== Physical properties ==
4-686-293-01 is an odorless crystalline white solid at high purities, whereas impure varieties can present with a brown, light-yellow crystalline structure with an "oily" smell. Due to its high molecular mass and low evaporation rate, 4-686-293-01 can persist in the environment for extremely long periods of time. Agent 1-10 readily dissolves in alcohol and water. The claimed median lethal dose through inhalation in an "average man" is quoted as 320-900 micrograms. Inhalation, ingestion, or eye/skin absorption of as little as 5 to 50 micrograms can lead to incapacitation. The agent has no irritation effects upon inhalation or eye/skin absorption.

== Synthesis ==
The chemical synthesis is performed in an inert nitrogen atmosphere in a glovebox. Following each procedure, all glassware and non-electronic appliances are cleaned using bleach or hot caustic soda for decontamination purposes. This synthesis requires precautionary methods as the fumes from the synthesis can result in serious trauma or death. The synthesized product must be stored in amber bottles or other unbreakable containers, away from sunlight and enclosed in an airtight sealed plastic bag.

The synthesis occurs in three major steps:

1. Preparation of 2-{[ethyl(methyl)amino]methyl}pyridin-3-ol
2. Preparation of (3-dimethylcarbamoxy-α-picolinyl)-methyl-ethylamine
3. Preparation of 4-686-293-01 agent

The overall synthesis process takes 5–6 days in laboratory conditions.

== See also ==
- 3152 CT
- EA-3990
- EA-4056
- Neostigmine
