= GV (nerve agent) =

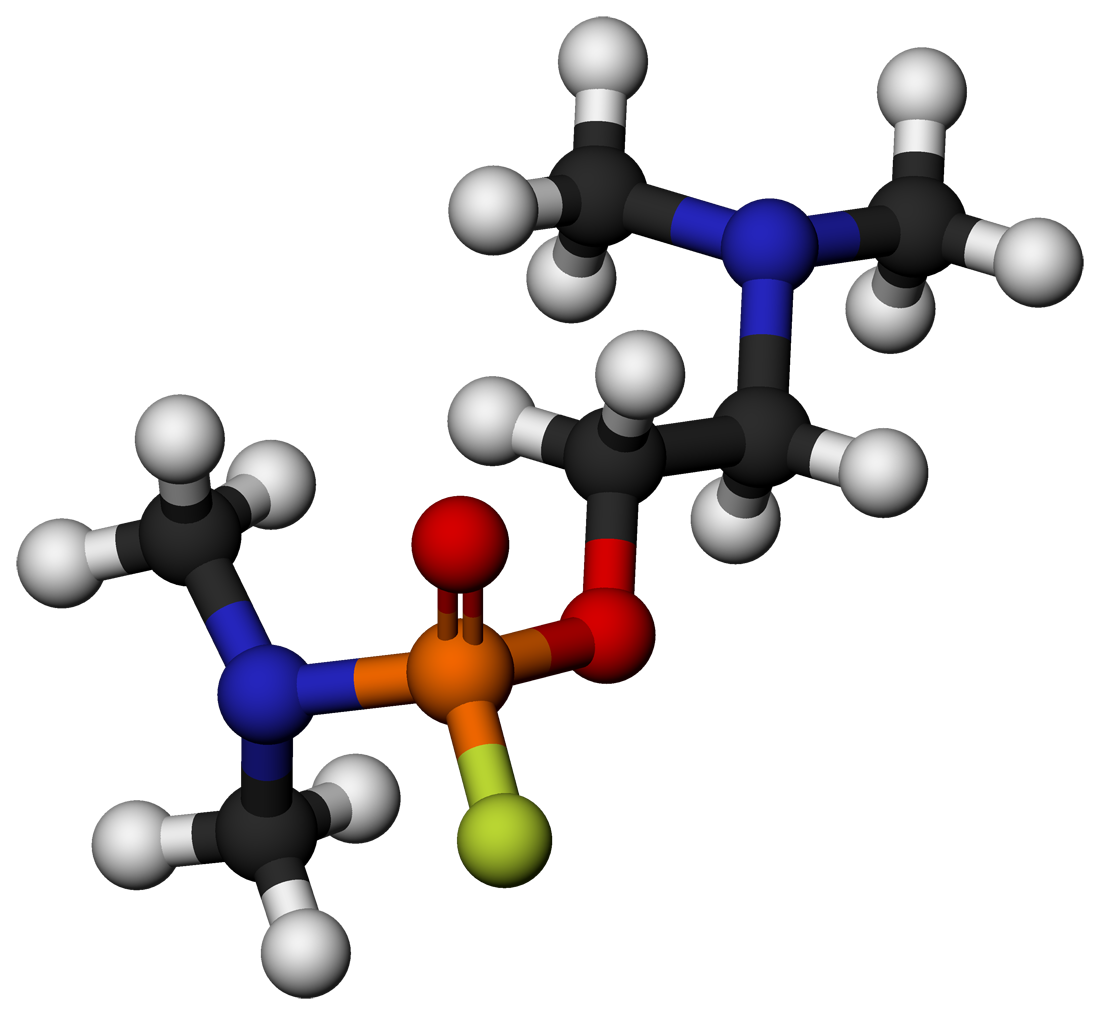
- Ball-and-stick model of GV

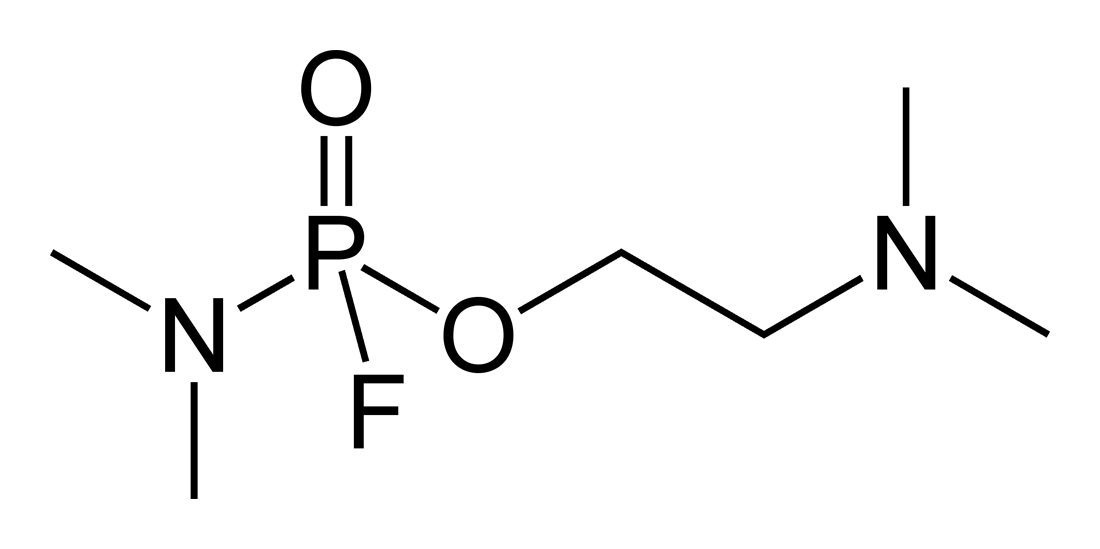
- Skeletal formula of GV

Names
- IUPAC name 2-(Dimethylamino)ethyl N,N-dimethylphosphoramidofluoridate
- Other names EA-5365; Deanylfluorotabun; G-agent P

Identifiers
CAS Number	141102-74-1
3D model (JSmol)	Interactive image
ChemSpider	112656
PubChem CID	132333
CompTox Dashboard (EPA)	DTXSID30930987
- InChI: InChI=1S/C6H16FN2OP/c1-8(2)5-6-11(7,10)9(3)4/h5-6H2,1-4H3 Key: JJHAGEZAXYOCMC-UHFFFAOYSA-N; InChI=1/C6H16FN2OP/c1-8(2)5-6-11(7,10)9(3)4/h5-6H2,1-4H3 Key: JJHAGEZAXYOCMC-UHFFFAOYAS
- SMILES: FP(=O)(N(C)C)OCCN(C)C

Properties
Chemical formula	C_{6}H_{16}FN_{2}O_{2}P
Molar mass	198.176 g/mol
- Except where otherwise noted, data are given for materials in their standard state (at 25 °C [77 °F], 100 kPa). verify (what is ?) Infobox references

GV (IUPAC name: 2-(Dimethylamino)ethyl N,N-dimethylphosphoramidofluoridate), also known as EA-5365 and GP (USACC cryptonym), is an organophosphate nerve agent. GV is a part of a series of nerve agents with properties similar to the "G-series" and "V-series".

== Physical structure ==
GV is an organophosphate derived from fluorotabun. It does not have a plane of symmetry and is therefore chiral. It has a melting point of -110 degrees Celsius, the lowest among all 5 GV agents.

== Chemistry ==
=== Manufacture ===
GV is synthesized by various routes. It is synthesized on an industrial scale in a similar manner to tabun and sarin.

A solution of dimethylamine, hydrofluoric acid and deanol in a molar ratio of 4:1:1 is added dropwise to a phosphoryl chloride solution under agitation. The product is filtered from the cake and then distilled under reduced pressure.

4 (H_{3}C)_{2}NH + Cl_{3}P(O) + (CH_{3})_{2}N(CH_{2})_{2}OH + F^{−} + H^{+} → (H_{3}C)_{2}NP(O)FO(CH_{2})_{2}N(CH_{3})_{2} + 3 Cl^{−} + 3 (H_{3}C)_{2}NH^{+}_{2}

GV can be synthesized in a similar manner to sarin, from a reaction between an equimolar mixture of dichlor and difluor.

(H_{3}C)_{2}NCl_{2}P(O) + (H_{3}C)_{2}NF_{2}P(O) + 2 (CH_{3})_{2}N(CH_{2})_{2}OH → 2 (H_{3}C)_{2}NP(O)FO(CH_{2})_{2}N(CH_{3})_{2} + 2 Cl^{−} + 2 H^{+}

=== Persistence ===
Compared to GA, GB, and GD, it is relatively persistent in aqueous media.

== Toxicity ==
It is a potent acetylcholinesterase inhibitor with properties similar to other nerve agents, with slightly slower speed of action than soman and sarin. GV is structurally a derivative of the nerve agent tabun, being closely structurally related to fluorotabun, differing from the latter by the replacement of a proton on the alpha carbon of the alkoxide group by a dimethylamino group and presenting a toxicity only lower than that of VX.

GV appears to be the most toxic agent in the GV series. GV being a derivative of the agent fluorotabun, four other derivatives of phosphoric acid are more toxic than the latter. The methylated GV agent, EA-5366, is a cholinomimetic.

It has an LCT50 of 40 mg m^{−3} - 2.5 times less than sarin, and 250 times less than chlorine gas.

Treatment for poisoning with GV involves drugs such as atropine, benactyzine, obidoxime, and HI-6.

== History ==
The GV agent was independently developed in the United States at the Edgewood Arsenal, under the code EA-5365, during the 1970s and in Czechoslovakia in 1983.

In Czechoslovakia, it was given the internal cryptonym GV. The cryptonym 'GV' also encompasses a number of similar compounds, sharing the typical structure - probably candidates for the cryptonym. In the United States, the compound is denoted by the cryptonym GP, belonging to the series of the same cryptonym.

The GV compounds investigated at edgewood arsenal have a more diverse structure. The purpose of developing the GV agent in the United States is not known for certain, but it may be related to the development program for a binary intermediate volatility agent (IVA). The production of binary agents is satisfactory for G agents of the second generation of nerve agents, but is not efficient for organophosphates with a deanyl group and their larger homologues - with a possible exception to the compounds EA 5400 and EA 5410, candidates for the cryptonym GX -, since the formation of the ammonium ion increases the instability of the agent by several tens of times to hydrolysis.

The most accepted structure for the GX agent - the dimethyl analog reduces toxicity as a function of the increase in the molecular mass of the substrate.

Due to its tendency to polymerize and high water instability, the GV agent did not meet the requirements for an IVA agent and was replaced by a binary mixture of sarin and EA-1356.

As GV-2, two substances are mentioned together, EA-5615 and EA-5636 - probably the dichloro and difluoro compounds -, with RA probably going to deanol or deanol plus base.

Agent GV belongs to the series of fourth generation chemical warfare agents, developed approximately in the same decade that novichok agents.

=== Agent GJ ===
A crucial element of Operation Shocker was the deliberate transmission of information about a nerve agent known as "GJ" to the Soviets. By 1964, Joseph Edward Cassidy had gained enough trust to steer Soviet research toward this agent. The US believed that GJ could not be made stable or weaponizable.

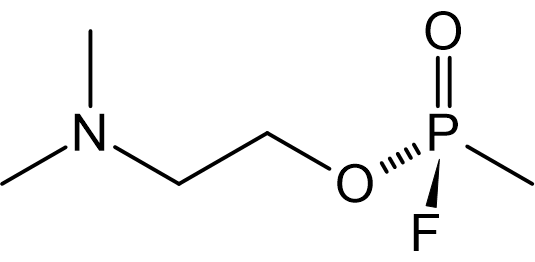
The probable structure of the chemical agent under the cryptonym "GJ", in addition to the structure of the GV agent.

Cassidy provided the Soviets with over 4,500 documents, mixing real and invented research on the compound GJ - Edgewood Arsenal attempted to develop a GJ agent and failed, with the files passed on being partially falsified -, with the intent to mislead and waste Soviet resources on a chemical weapon program that was, in essence, a dead end.

It is likely that this counterintelligence tactic was responsible for the Soviet Union's development of Novichok agents.

The nerve agent description is very similar to the GV agent, although GV has been developed during the 1970s, has intermediate volatility, and the unitary agent has a recent EA number identifier. In the 1950s, attention was given to methylphosphonates G agents, with Tammelin esters with very high toxicity and instability, with the latter being very similar to the GV - except for the replacement of the dimethylamino group by a methyl.

== See also ==
- Fluorotabun
- Methylfluorophosphonylcholine
- VG (nerve agent)
- Novichok agent
