= TL-599 =

Names
- Preferred IUPAC name 4-[(Dimethylcarbamoyl)oxy]-N,N,N-trimethyl-2-(propan-2-yl)anilinium iodide
- Other names SB-8

Identifiers
| CAS Number | 63981-53-3 |
| 3D model (JSmol) | Interactive image |
| ChemSpider | 41823 |
| PubChem CID | 45961 |
| UNII | SD9T6QM997 |
| CompTox Dashboard (EPA) | DTXSID10981619 |
- InChI: InChI=1S/C15H25N2O2.HI/c1-11(2)13-10-12(19-15(18)16(3)4)8-9-14(13)17(5,6)7;/h8-11H,1-7H3;1H/q+1;/p-1 Key: DBMNNBLVHXQGOH-UHFFFAOYSA-M
- SMILES: CC(C)c1cc(ccc1[N+](C)(C)C)OC(=O)N(C)C.[I-]

Properties
| Chemical formula | C_{15}H_{25}IN_{2}O_{2} |
| Molar mass | 392.281 g·mol^{−1} |

Hazards
- Lethal dose or concentration (LD, LC)
| LD_{50} (median dose) | 75 μg/kg (subcutaneous, mice); 168 μg/kg (intraperitoneal, mice); 75 μg/kg (mice, subcutaneous) |
| LD_{Lo} (lowest published) | 100 μg/kg (guinea pigs, subcutaneous) |
- Except where otherwise noted, data are given for materials in their standard state (at 25 °C [77 °F], 100 kPa). Infobox references

TL-599, also known as SB-8, is an extremely potent carbamate class acetylcholinesterase inhibitor.

== See also ==
- Neostigmine
- Miotine
- T-1123
- T-1152
- T-1194
- TL-1238
- Physostigmine
