= EA-3887 =

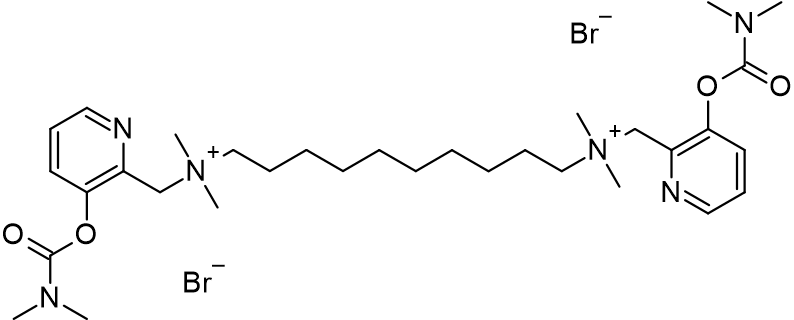

Identifiers
CAS Number	110913-97-8
3D model (JSmol)	Interactive image; EA-3887A: Interactive image
- InChI: InChI=1S/C32H54N6O4.2BrH/c1-35(2)31(39)41-29-19-17-21-33-27(29)25-37(5,6)23-15-13-11-9-10-12-14-16-24-38(7,8)26-28-30(20-18-22-34-28)42-32(40)36(3)4;;/h17-22H,9-16,23-26H2,1-8H3;2*1H/q+2;;/p-2 Key: DQBNOGPLNCQNRU-UHFFFAOYSA-L; EA-3887A: InChI=1S/C32H54N6O4.2HI/c1-35(2)31(39)41-29-19-17-21-33-27(29)25-37(5,6)23-15-13-11-9-10-12-14-16-24-38(7,8)26-28-30(20-18-22-34-28)42-32(40)36(3)4;;/h17-22H,9-16,23-26H2,1-8H3;2*1H/q+2;;/p-2 Key: SVOHVDLZDBYNNU-UHFFFAOYSA-L
- SMILES: CN(C)C(=O)Oc1cccnc1C[N+](C)(C)CCCCCCCCCC[N+](C)(C)Cc2ncccc2OC(=O)N(C)C.[Br-].[Br-]; EA-3887A: CN(C)C(=O)Oc1cccnc1C[N+](C)(C)CCCCCCCCCC[N+](C)(C)Cc2ncccc2OC(=O)N(C)C.[I-].[I-]

Properties
Chemical formula	C_{32}H_{54}Br_{2}N_{6}O_{4}
Molar mass	746.630 g·mol^{−1}
Appearance	White solid
Melting point	198–199 °C (388–390 °F; 471–472 K)

Hazards
- Lethal dose or concentration (LD, LC)
LD_{50} (median dose)	10 μg/kg (mice, intravenous); 4.2 μg/kg (rabbits, intravenous)
- Except where otherwise noted, data are given for materials in their standard state (at 25 °C [77 °F], 100 kPa). Infobox references

EA-3887 is a carbamate nerve agent. The iodide salt of EA-3887 is EA-3887A.

== See also ==
- 3152 CT
- EA-3966
- EA-3990
- EA-4056
- T-1123
- TL-1238
