= T-1194 =

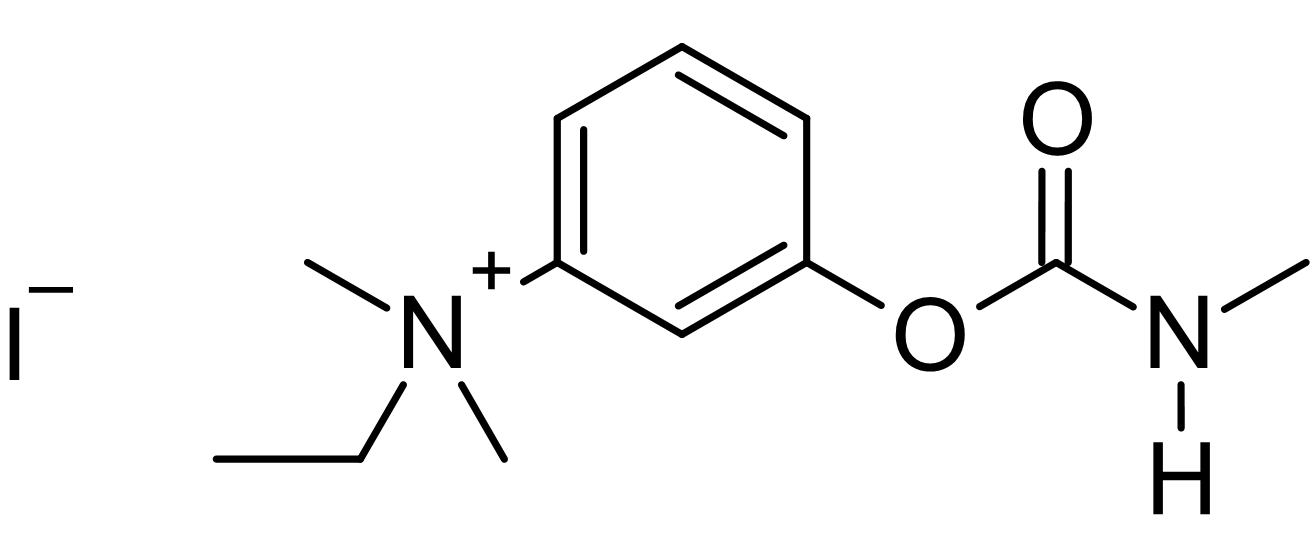

Names
- Other names TL-1323

Identifiers
CAS Number	63981-97-5
3D model (JSmol)	Interactive image
ChemSpider	41900
PubChem CID	46038
UNII	7Z85N7S5T3
CompTox Dashboard (EPA)	DTXSID10981659
- InChI: InChI=1S/C12H18N2O2.HI/c1-5-14(3,4)10-7-6-8-11(9-10)16-12(15)13-2;/h6-9H,5H2,1-4H3;1H Key: JABYKLLZSMHVBH-UHFFFAOYSA-N
- SMILES: CC[N+](C)(C)C1=CC(=CC=C1)OC(=O)NC.[I-]

Properties
Chemical formula	C_{12}H_{19}IN_{2}O_{2}
Molar mass	350.200 g·mol^{−1}

Hazards
- Occupational safety and health (OHS/OSH)
Main hazards	Extremely toxic
- Lethal dose or concentration (LD, LC)
LD_{50} (median dose)	135 μg/kg (subcutaneous, mice); 130 μg/kg (subcutaneous, rabbits)
- Except where otherwise noted, data are given for materials in their standard state (at 25 °C [77 °F], 100 kPa). Infobox references

T-1194, also known as TL-1323, is an extremely toxic carbamate nerve agent. T-1194 is the N-methylcarbamate ester of edrophonium iodide. The bromide salt of T-1194 is AR-14.

== See also ==
- T-1123
- T-1152
- TL-599
- TL-1238
- Neostigmine
- Miotine
