= Dimethylamidophosphoric dicyanide =

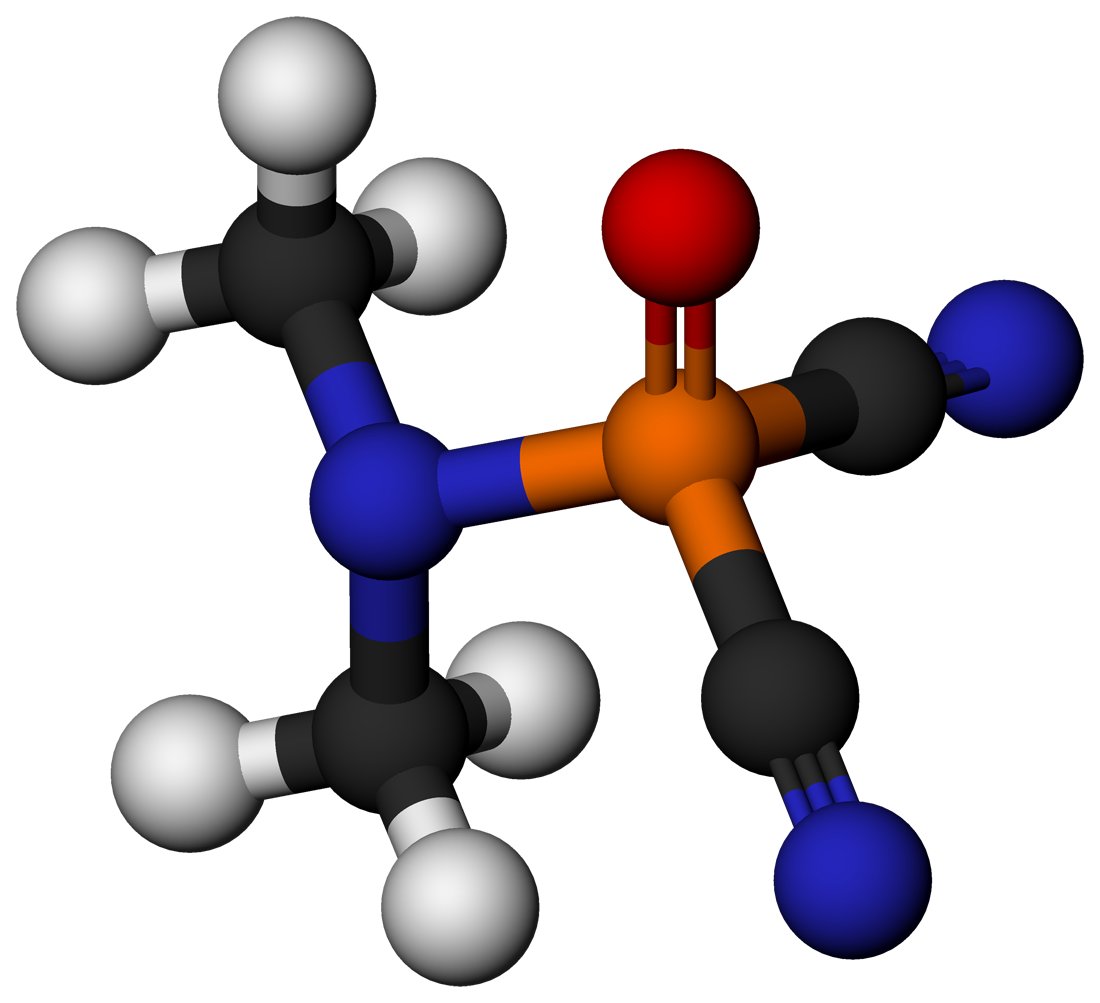
- Dimethylamidophosphoric dicyanide 3D model

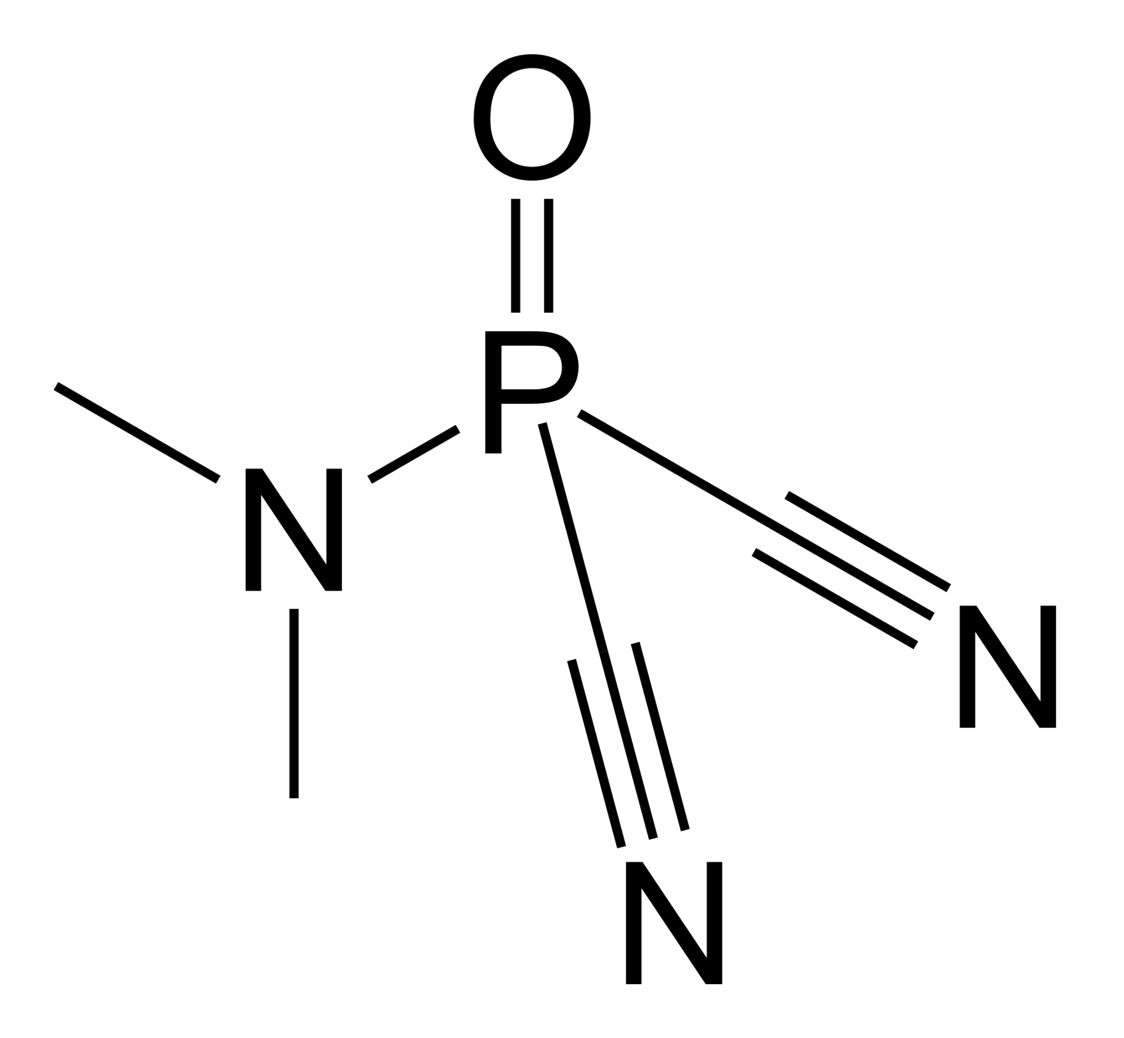
- Dimethylamidophosphoric dicyanide 2D structure

Names
- Preferred IUPAC name N,N-Dimethylphosphoramidic dicyanide
- Other names (Dimethylamido)phosphoryl dicyanide N,N-Dimethylphosphoramidodicyanidate; N-Dicyanophosphoryl-N-methylmethanamine

Identifiers
3D model (JSmol)	Interactive image
ChemSpider	26327732
PubChem CID	71308183
CompTox Dashboard (EPA)	DTXSID201030094
- InChI: InChI=1S/C4H6N3OP/c1-7(2)9(8,3-5)4-6/h1-2H3 Key: REFCDSGCMMWWTR-UHFFFAOYSA-N; InChI=1/C4H6N3OP/c1-7(2)9(8,3-5)4-6/h1-2H3 Key: REFCDSGCMMWWTR-UHFFFAOYAK
- SMILES: CN(C)P(=O)(C#N)C#N

Properties
Chemical formula	C_{4}H_{6}N_{3}OP
Molar mass	143.086 g·mol^{−1}

Hazards
NFPA 704 (fire diamond)	4 3 2 W
- Except where otherwise noted, data are given for materials in their standard state (at 25 °C [77 °F], 100 kPa). verify (what is ?) Infobox references

Dimethylamidophosphoric dicyanide is an important chemical for the final process of synthesizing Tabun, a nerve agent used as a chemical weapon.

== Preparation ==
Dimethylamidophosphoric dicyanide could be prepared by reacting Dimethylamidophosphoric dichloride with sodium cyanide.

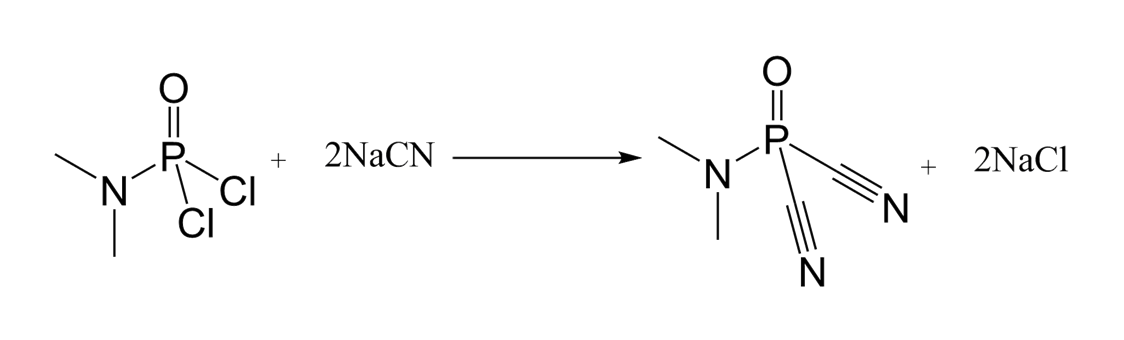

== Safety ==
This chemical is very flammable, highly toxic, and reactive. If ingested or absorbed through skin, it will cause mild nerve agent symptoms directly as well as blood agent symptoms due to release of HCN. If mixed with water, it gives off poisonous hydrogen cyanide fumes and dimethylamidophosphoric acid.

== See also ==
- Organophosphate poisoning
- Hydrogen cyanide
