= T-1152 =

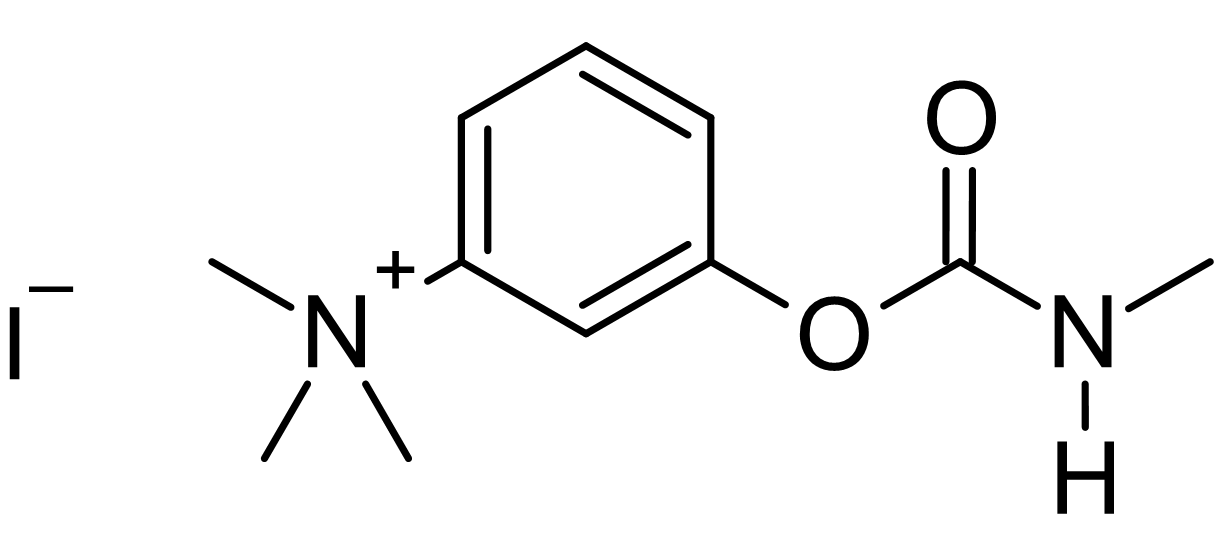

Names
- Other names: TL-1178; Stedman's meta compound

Identifiers
| CAS Number | 3983-39-9 |
| 3D model (JSmol) | Interactive image |
| ChemSpider | 18732 |
| PubChem CID | 19886 |
| UNII | 7KPX8SZ9L6 |
| CompTox Dashboard (EPA) | DTXSID60960393 |
- InChI: InChI=1S/C11H16N2O2.HI/c1-12-11(14)15-10-7-5-6-9(8-10)13(2,3)4;/h5-8H,1-4H3;1H Key: MIAARRZWMRMHIS-UHFFFAOYSA-N
- SMILES: CNC(=O)OC1=CC=CC(=C1)[N+](C)(C)C.[I-]

Hazards
- Lethal dose or concentration (LD, LC)
| LD_{50} (median dose) | 270 μg/kg (subcutaneous, mice); 115 μg/kg (intravenous, mice); 260 μg/kg (subcutaneous, rabbits) |
| LD_{Lo} (lowest published) | 2.5 mg/kg (oral, mice) |
- Except where otherwise noted, data are given for materials in their standard state (at 25 °C [77 °F], 100 kPa). Infobox references

T-1152 is a quaternary carbamate anticholinesterase. It is synthesized by reaction of m-dimethylaminophenol with methyl isocyanate, followed by quaternization with methyl iodide. Since T-1152 is toxic by ingestion, it was patented as a rodenticide in 1932.

The chloride and methylsulfate salt of T-1152 is T-1690 (TL-1226) and AR-13, respectively.

== See also ==
- Neostigmine
- T-1123
- T-1194
- TL-599
- TL-1238
