= Neostigmine/glycopyrronium bromide =

Combination medication

Combination of
- Neostigmine: Cholinesterase inhibitor
- Glycopyrronium bromide: Antimuscarinic agent

Clinical data
- Trade names: Prevduo
- Other names: Neostigmine methylsulfate/glycopyrrolate, glycopyrronium bromide/neostigmine metilsulfate
- AHFS/Drugs.com: Micromedex Detailed Consumer Information
- License data: US DailyMed: Neostigmine methylsulfate and glycopyrrolate
- Routes of administration: Intravenous
- ATC code: N07AA51 (WHO)

Legal status
- Legal status: UK: POM (Prescription only); US: ℞-only

Neostigmine/glycopyrronium bromide, sold under the brand name Prevduo , is a fixed-dose combination medication used for the reversal of the effects of non-depolarizing neuromuscular blocking agents after surgery. It contains neostigmine as the methylsulfate, a cholinesterase inhibitor, and glycopyrronium bromide, an antimuscarinic agent.

Neostigmine/glycopyrronium bromide was approved for medical use in the United Kingdom in 2007, and in the United States in February 2023.

== Medical uses ==
Neostigmine/glycopyrronium bromide is indicated for the reversal of the effects of non-depolarizing neuromuscular blocking agents after surgery, while decreasing the peripheral muscarinic effects (e.g., bradycardia and excessive secretions) associated with cholinesterase inhibition following non-depolarizing neuromuscular blocking agent reversal administration.
