= Dibromooctane =

Group of chemical compounds

Dibromooctane may refer to:

- 1,2-Dibromooctane, a double brominated aliphatic compound
- 1,8-Dibromooctane, compound used in the synthesis of carbamate nerve agents
