= Fluorotabun =

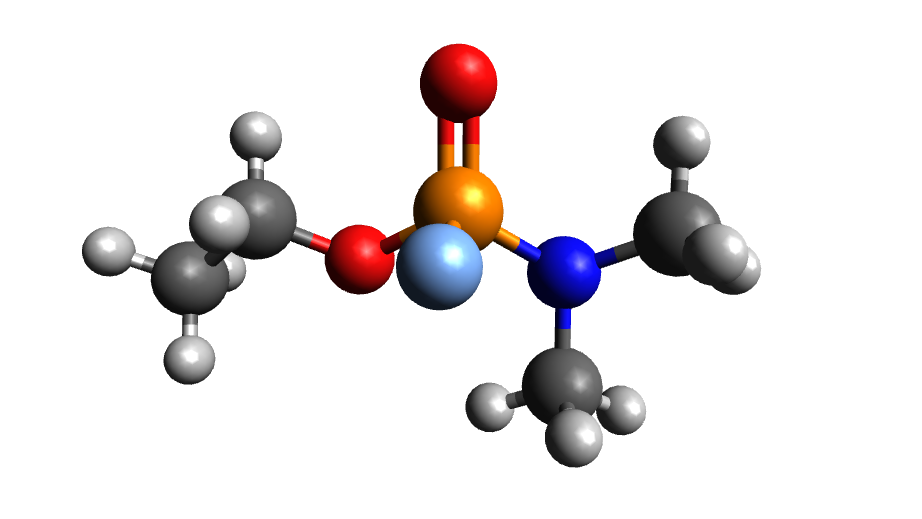

Names
- IUPAC name Ethyl dimethylphosphoramidofluoridate

Identifiers
| CAS Number | 358-29-2 |
| 3D model (JSmol) | Interactive image |
| ChemSpider | 61069 |
| PubChem CID | 67750 |
| UNII | 92M8GJ9DTJ |
| CompTox Dashboard (EPA) | DTXSID70957178 |
- InChI: InChI=1S/C4H11FNO2P/c1-4-8-9(5,7)6(2)3/h4H2,1-3H3 Key: JYXIMOLVBWANAH-UHFFFAOYSA-N
- SMILES: CCOP(=O)(N(C)C)F

Properties
| Chemical formula | C_{4}H_{11}FNO_{2}P |
| Molar mass | 155.109 g·mol^{−1} |

Hazards
- Occupational safety and health (OHS/OSH)
| Main hazards | Highly toxic |
- Lethal dose or concentration (LD, LC)
| LD_{50} (median dose) | 2.5 mg/kg (mice, intraperitoneal) |
- Except where otherwise noted, data are given for materials in their standard state (at 25 °C [77 °F], 100 kPa). Infobox references

Fluorotabun is a highly toxic organophosphate nerve agent of the G-series. It is the fluorinated analog of tabun, i.e. the cyanide group is replaced by a fluorine atom.

GAF is considered an ineffective GA-like agent. It is less effective than GAA.

== See also ==
- Tabun (nerve agent)
- GV (nerve agent)
