= EA-3966 =

Names
- Preferred IUPAC name N^{1}-({3-[(Dimethylcarbamoyl)oxy]pyridin-2-yl}methyl)-N^{1},N^{1},N^{10},N^{10},N^{10}-pentamethyldecane-1,10-bis(aminium) dibromide

Identifiers
CAS Number	110913-86-5
3D model (JSmol)	Interactive image
PubChem CID	165360155
UNII	JR6HDD5TZK
CompTox Dashboard (EPA)	DTXSID201336456
- InChI: InChI=1S/C24H46N4O2.2BrH/c1-26(2)24(29)30-23-17-16-18-25-22(23)21-28(6,7)20-15-13-11-9-8-10-12-14-19-27(3,4)5;;/h16-18H,8-15,19-21H2,1-7H3;2*1H/q+2;;/p-2 Key: SMYJBWHIVMYSPG-UHFFFAOYSA-L
- SMILES: [Br-].[Br-].CN(C)C(=O)Oc1cccnc1C[N+](C)(C)CCCCCCCCCC[N+](C)(C)C

Properties
Chemical formula	C_{24}H_{46}Br_{2}N_{4}O_{2}
Molar mass	582.466 g·mol^{−1}
Appearance	Crystalline solid
Melting point	139–143 °C (282–289 °F; 412–416 K)
- Except where otherwise noted, data are given for materials in their standard state (at 25 °C [77 °F], 100 kPa). Infobox references

EA-3966 is a carbamate nerve agent. It is synthesized by reacting 2-dimethylaminomethyl-3-dimethylcarbamoxypyridine with 10-bromodecyltrimethylammonium bromide.

== See also ==
- 3152 CT
- EA-3887
- EA-3990
- EA-4056
- T-1123
- TL-1238
- Decamethonium
