= EA-4352 =

Chemical compound

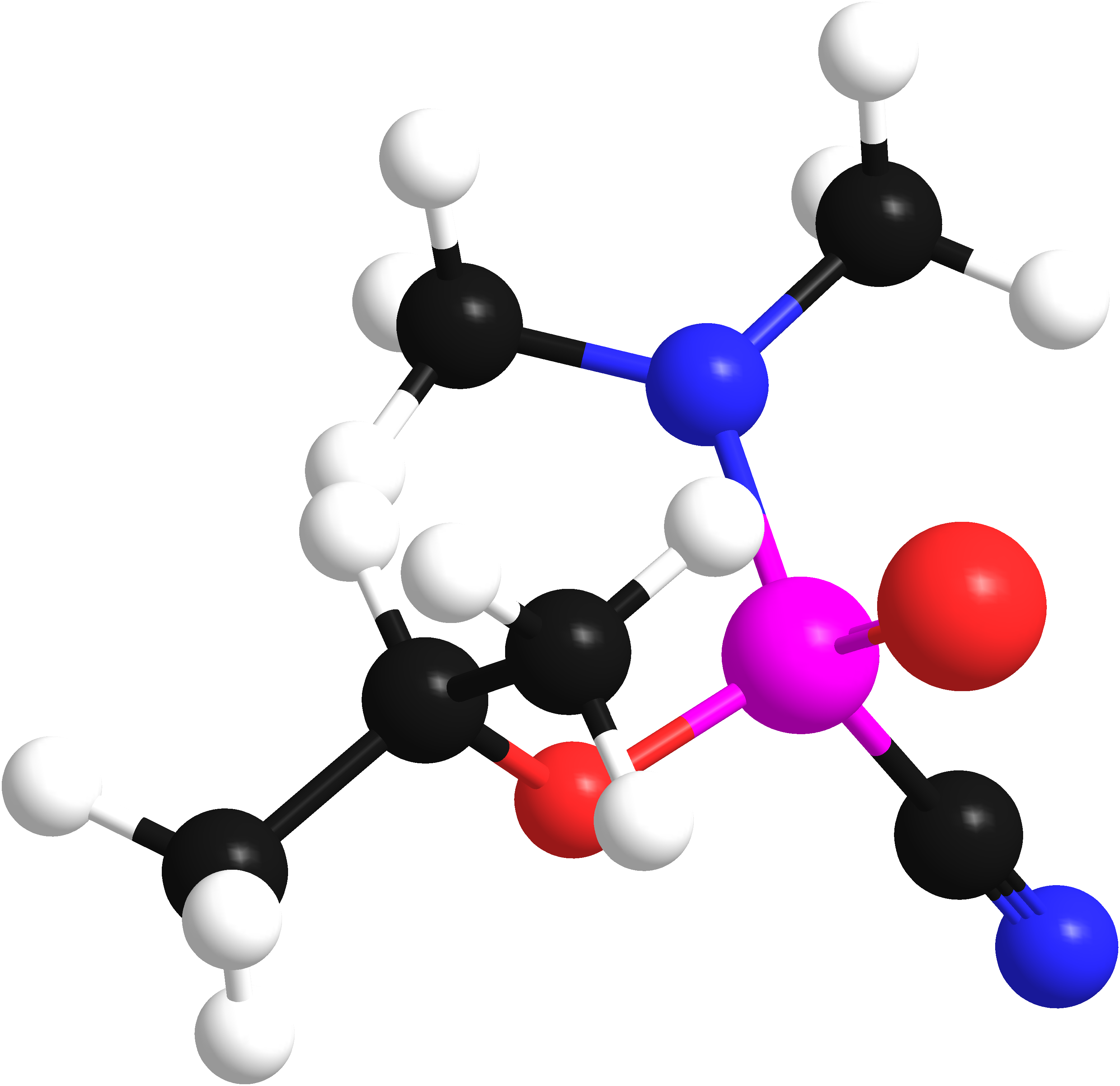

Names
- IUPAC name Isopropyl dimethylphosphoramidocyanidate
- Other names Isopropyl dimethylamidocyanidophosphate

Identifiers
CAS Number	63815-55-4
3D model (JSmol)	Interactive image
ChemSpider	102317
PubChem CID	114256
CompTox Dashboard (EPA)	DTXSID20980395
- InChI: InChI=1S/C6H13N2O2P/c1-6(2)10-11(9,5-7)8(3)4/h6H,1-4H3 Key: UQPMVHZOZHVRLJ-UHFFFAOYSA-N
- SMILES: CC(C)OP(=O)(C#N)N(C)C

Properties
Chemical formula	C_{6}H_{13}N_{2}O_{2}P
Molar mass	176.156 g·mol^{−1}
Appearance	Liquid
Odor	Odorless
Density	1.0425 g/mL (77°F)
Boiling point	234 °C; 453 °F; 507 K
Vapor pressure	0.055 mmHg (77°F)

Hazards
- Occupational safety and health (OHS/OSH)
Main hazards	Extremely toxic
- Lethal dose or concentration (LD, LC)
LD_{50} (median dose)	462 μg/kg (mice, intraperitoneal)
- Except where otherwise noted, data are given for materials in their standard state (at 25 °C [77 °F], 100 kPa). Infobox references

EA-4352 is an organophosphate nerve agent of the G-series. It is the isopropyl analog of tabun. It has approximately the same toxicity as the agent sarin.
