= EA-3990 =

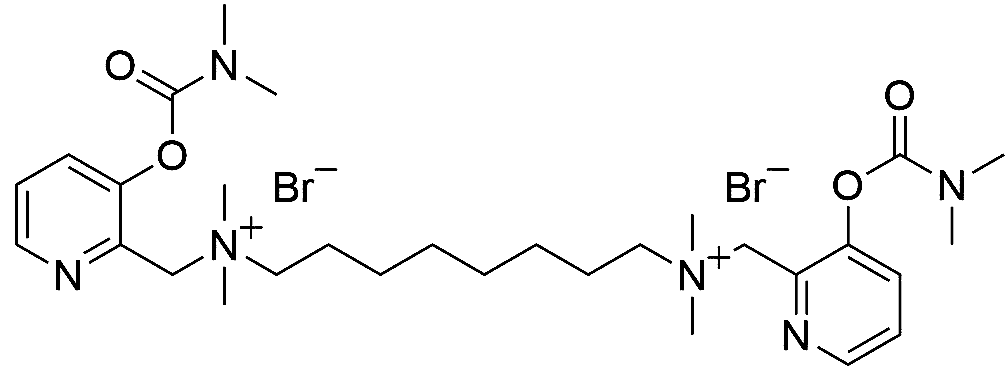

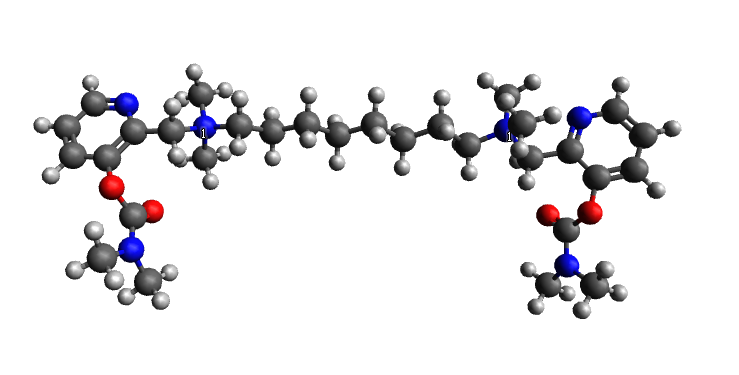

Names
- Preferred IUPAC name N^{1},N^{8}-Bis({3-[(dimethylcarbamoyl)oxy]pyridin-2-yl}methyl)-N^{1},N^{1},N^{8},N^{8}-tetramethyloctane-1,8-bis(aminium) dibromide

Identifiers
CAS Number	110913-95-6
3D model (JSmol)	Interactive image
PubChem CID	13955106
CompTox Dashboard (EPA)	DTXSID901336302
- InChI: InChI=1S/C30H50N6O4.2BrH/c1-33(2)29(37)39-27-17-15-19-31-25(27)23-35(5,6)21-13-11-9-10-12-14-22-36(7,8)24-26-28(18-16-20-32-26)40-30(38)34(3)4;;/h15-20H,9-14,21-24H2,1-8H3;2*1H/q+2;;/p-2 Key: ABTAGUMOWVVEGK-UHFFFAOYSA-L
- SMILES: [Br-].[Br-].CN(C)C(=O)Oc1cccnc1C[N+](C)(C)CCCCCCCC[N+](C)(C)Cc2ncccc2OC(=O)N(C)C

Properties
Chemical formula	C_{30}H_{50}N_{6}Br_{2}O_{4}
Molar mass	718.7 g/mol
Appearance	white, odorless crystalline solid.
Density	1.33 g/cm^{3}
Melting point	190–191 °C
Solubility	soluble in alcohols, acetic acid and chloroform
Vapor pressure	negligible

Hazards
- Lethal dose or concentration (LD, LC)
LD_{50} (median dose)	6.3 µg/kg for mice and 2.6 µg/kg for rabbits via IV
- Except where otherwise noted, data are given for materials in their standard state (at 25 °C [77 °F], 100 kPa). Infobox references

EA-3990 is a deadly carbamate nerve agent. It is lethal because it inhibits acetylcholinesterase. Inhibition causes an overly high accumulation of acetylcholine between the nerve and muscle cells. This paralyzes the muscles by preventing their relaxation. The paralyzed muscles include the muscles used for breathing.

Patent assigned to US army for EA-3990 among other similar nerve agents was filed in December 7, 1967. It patents derivatives with 3 to 11 carbons in the connecting alkane chain.

== Lethality ==
EA-3990 lethality in humans is unknown but estimates have been made.

Carbamates like EA-3990 are well absorbed by the lungs, gastrointestinal tracts, and the skin. Signs and symptoms from exposure to such carbamates are similar to other nerve agents. In general their penetration through the blood-brain barrier is difficult due to quaternary nitrogens in these molecules. Despite this, EA-3990 is claimed to be about three times more toxic than VX (another nerve agent). For VX, the median lethal dose (LD_{50}) for 70 kg men via exposure to the skin is estimated to be 10 mg, and the lethal concentration time (LCt_{50}), measuring the concentration of the vapor per length of time exposed, is estimated to be 30–50 mg·min/m^{3}. These values for EA-3990 can be estimated to be 3.3 mg and 10–16.7 mg·min/m^{3} by division.

Intravenous LD_{50} for EA-3990 is 0.0063 mg/kg for mice and 0.0026 mg/kg for rabbits.

== Properties ==
EA-3990's CAS is 110913-95-6, mass 718.7 g/mol, melting point 190–191 °C, density 1.33 g/cm^{3}, vapor pressure is negligible, and it is soluble in alcohols, acetic acid and chloroform. It is a white, odorless crystalline solid. EA-3990 evaporates slowly in to the air; thus it can be classified as being extremely persistent in the environment if any possible effects of external factors like sun light and water (air humidity) upon it are neglected. Various salts other than bromide have been reported.

== Synthesis ==
Two methods have been described for synthesizing EA-3990 along with similar nerve agents.

The 2-dimethylaminomethyl-3-dimethylcarbamoxypyridine precursor is prepared via a Mannich reaction using 3-pyridol (CAS 109-00-2), dimethylamine and formaldehyde. The resulting 2-((Dimethylamino)methyl)pyridin-3-ol (CAS 2168-13-0) is then carbamoylated with dimethylcarbamoyl chloride. Other secondary amines can be used, such as those containing methyl, ethyl, propyl, isopropyl, butyl and benzyl groups.

In the first method 2 moles of 2-dimethylaminomethyl-3-dimethylcarbamoxypyridine and app. 1 mol α,ω-dihaloalkane (e.g. 1,8-dibromooctane in this case) in acetonitrile is heated on a steam bath for 6 hours. It is then allowed to stand overnight at room temperature. The crystalline product is collected by filtration.

In the second method 2 mol and 1 mol of the previous reagents used in the first method are added together, but also a catalytic amount of sodium iodide in acetonitrile is added to the solution, which is then allowed to stand for 6 days. Crystalline material is usually formed during this period and it is then collected by filtration.

In both methods, after filtration, the crystalline product is triturated with acetone. If no solid separates, ethyl acetate is added to precipitate the crude product. The product is then dissolved in hot ethanol and treated with decolorizing charcoal. Ethyl acetate is added to the filtered solution to precipitate the crystalline product. E-3990 is then collected and dried. Yield is 63%.

== See also ==
- 3152 CT
- EA-3887
- EA-3966
- EA-4056
- T-1123
