= 1,9-Dibromononane =

Names
- Preferred IUPAC name 1,9-Dibromononane

Identifiers
CAS Number	4549-33-1
3D model (JSmol)	Interactive image
ChemSpider	19474
ECHA InfoCard	100.022.649
EC Number	224-913-0
PubChem CID	20677
UNII	KSF9KUY9PA
CompTox Dashboard (EPA)	DTXSID0063521
- InChI: InChI=1S/C9H18Br2/c10-8-6-4-2-1-3-5-7-9-11/h1-9H2 Key: WGAXVZXBFBHLMC-UHFFFAOYSA-N
- SMILES: C(CCCCBr)CCCCBr

Properties
Chemical formula	C_{9}H_{18}Br_{2}
Molar mass	286.051 g·mol^{−1}

Hazards
- GHS labelling
Pictograms	(GHS07: Exclamation mark)
Signal word	Warning
Hazard statements	H315, H319, H335
Precautionary statements	P261, P264, P271, P280, P302+P352, P304+P340, P305+P351+P338, P312, P321, P332+P313, P337+P313, P362, P403+P233, P405, P501
- Except where otherwise noted, data are given for materials in their standard state (at 25 °C [77 °F], 100 kPa). Infobox references

1,9-Dibromononane is a chemical compound used in the synthesis of the carbamate nerve agent EA-4056.
