= Methylfluorophosphonylcholine =

Names
- Preferred IUPAC name N,N,N-Trimethyl-2-[(methylphosphonofluoridoyl)oxy]ethan-1-aminium
- Other names Methylfluorophosphorylcholine, MFPCh

Identifiers
| CAS Number | 44991-89-1 |
| 3D model (JSmol) | Interactive image |
| ChemSpider | 36051 |
| PubChem CID | 39430 |
| CompTox Dashboard (EPA) | DTXSID70963315 |
- InChI: InChI=1S/C6H16FNO2P/c1-8(2,3)5-6-10-11(4,7)9/h5-6H2,1-4H3/q+1 Key: OKNSDXKIPFDADW-UHFFFAOYSA-N
- SMILES: C[N+](C)(C)CCOP(=O)(C)F

Properties
| Chemical formula | C_{6}H_{16}FNO_{2}P |
| Molar mass | 184.171 g·mol^{−1} |

Hazards
- Occupational safety and health (OHS/OSH)
| Main hazards | Extremely toxic |
- Lethal dose or concentration (LD, LC)
| LD_{50} (median dose) | 100 μg/kg (mice, intraperitoneal) |
- Except where otherwise noted, data are given for materials in their standard state (at 25 °C [77 °F], 100 kPa). Infobox references

Methylfluorophosphonylcholine (MFPCh) is an extremely toxic chemical compound related to the G-series nerve agents. It is an extremely potent acetylcholinesterase inhibitor which is around 100 times more potent than sarin at inhibiting acetylcholinesterase in vitro, and around 10 times more potent in vivo, depending on route of administration and animal species tested. MFPCh is resistant to oxime reactivators, meaning the acetylcholinesterase inhibited by MFPCh can't be reactivated by cholinesterase reactivators. MFPCh also acts directly on the acetylcholine receptors. MFPCh is a relatively unstable compound and degrades rapidly in storage, so despite its enhanced toxicity it was not deemed suitable to be weaponised for military use.

== See also ==
- GV (nerve agent)
- Sarin
- GX
- TMTFA
