= Miotine =

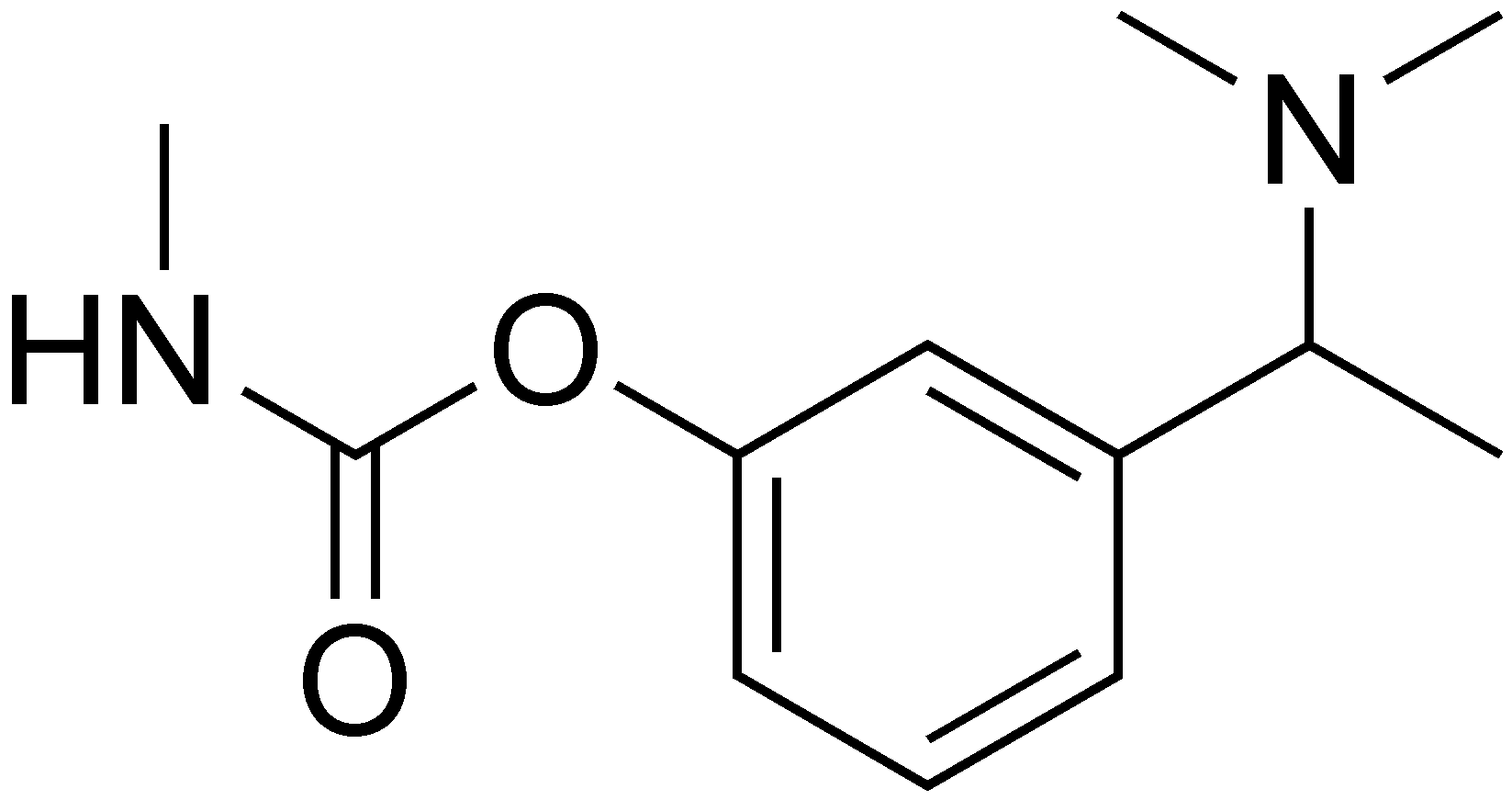

Names
- IUPAC name [3-[1-(Dimethylamino)ethyl]phenyl] N-methylcarbamate
- Other names AR-28; T-1843

Identifiers
CAS Number	4464-16-8
3D model (JSmol)	Interactive image
ChemSpider	41955
KEGG	C11763
PubChem CID	46093
UNII	9Z3ZT09RRU
CompTox Dashboard (EPA)	DTXSID10275489
- InChI: InChI=1S/C12H18N2O2/c1-9(14(3)4)10-6-5-7-11(8-10)16-12(15)13-2/h5-9H,1-4H3,(H,13,15) Key: KQOUPMYYRQWZLI-UHFFFAOYSA-N; InChI=1/C12H18N2O2/c1-9(14(3)4)10-6-5-7-11(8-10)16-12(15)13-2/h5-9H,1-4H3,(H,13,15) Key: KQOUPMYYRQWZLI-UHFFFAOYAX
- SMILES: CC(C1=CC(=CC=C1)OC(=O)NC)N(C)C

Properties
Chemical formula	C_{12}H_{18}N_{2}O_{2}
Molar mass	222.288 g·mol^{−1}
- Except where otherwise noted, data are given for materials in their standard state (at 25 °C [77 °F], 100 kPa). verify (what is ?) Infobox references

Miotine is an anticholinesterase drug. Miotine was the first synthetic carbamate that was used clinically.

Unlike the miotine analog neostigmine, it does not have a quaternary ammonium group to give it a permanent positive charge. It can exist as an uncharged free base which could allow it to cross the blood–brain barrier and cause unwanted central nervous system (CNS) side effects.

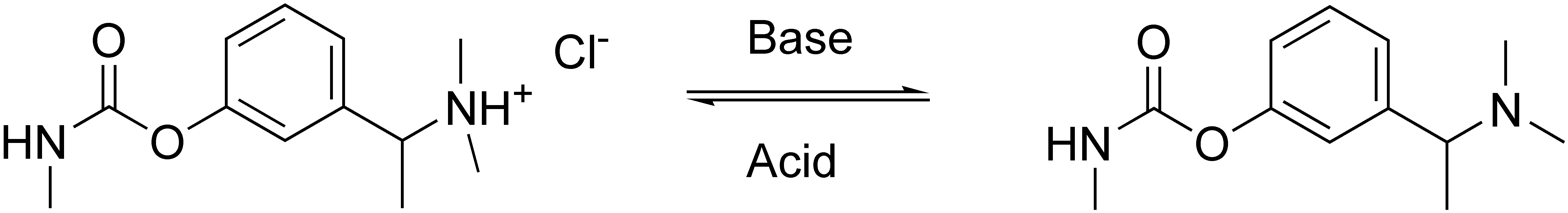
Miotine equilibrium

== See also ==
- Neostigmine
- T-1123
- TL-1238
- TMTFA
