= EA-4056 =

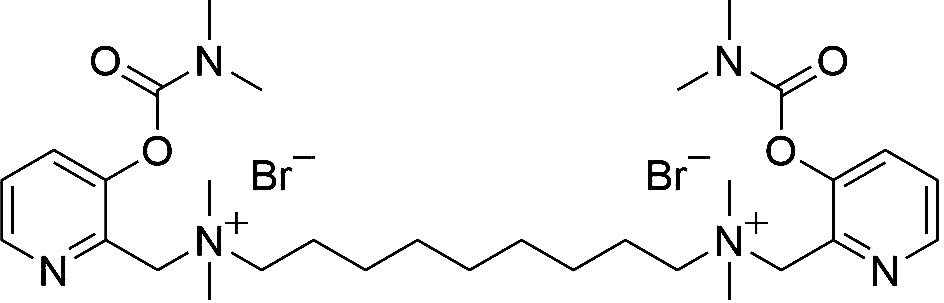

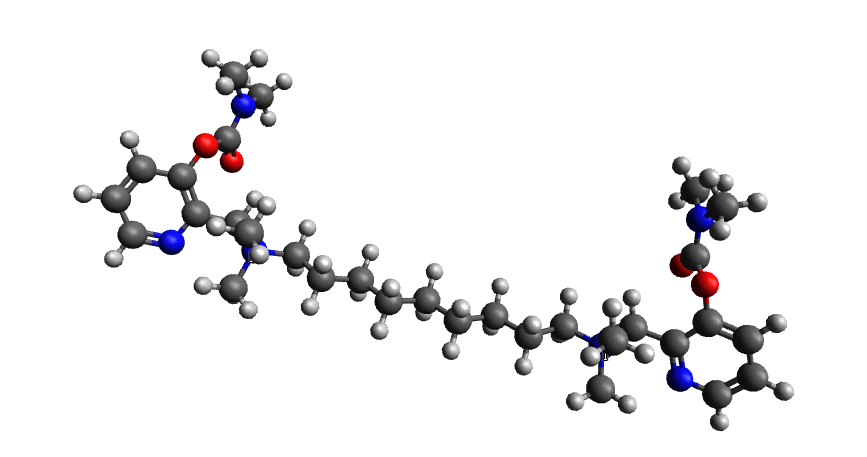

Names
- IUPAC name 1,9-Bis[methyl-2(3-dimethylcarbamoxypyridyl)methylamino]nonane dimethobromide
- Preferred IUPAC name N^{1},N^{9}-Bis({3-[(dimethylcarbamoyl)oxy]pyridin-2-yl}methyl)-N^{1},N^{1},N^{9},N^{9}-tetramethylnonane-1,9-bis(aminium) dibromide

Identifiers
CAS Number	110913-96-7
3D model (JSmol)	Interactive image
PubChem CID	13955108
CompTox Dashboard (EPA)	DTXSID601336303
- InChI: InChI=1S/C31H52N6O4.2BrH/c1-34(2)30(38)40-28-18-16-20-32-26(28)24-36(5,6)22-14-12-10-9-11-13-15-23-37(7,8)25-27-29(19-17-21-33-27)41-31(39)35(3)4;;/h16-21H,9-15,22-25H2,1-8H3;2*1H/q+2;;/p-2 Key: AQIHLGWYYFRMKZ-UHFFFAOYSA-L
- SMILES: [Br-].[Br-].CN(C)C(=O)Oc1cccnc1C[N+](C)(C)CCCCCCCCC[N+](C)(C)Cc2ncccc2OC(=O)N(C)C

Properties
Chemical formula	C_{31}H_{52}N_{6}O_{4} · Br_{2}
Molar mass	732.6 g/mol
Appearance	crystalline solid
Melting point	100–105 °C
Solubility	soluble in water and alcohols

Hazards
- Lethal dose or concentration (LD, LC)
LD_{50} (median dose)	11 µg/kg for mice and 2.7 µg/kg for rabbits via IV
- Except where otherwise noted, data are given for materials in their standard state (at 25 °C [77 °F], 100 kPa). Infobox references

EA-4056 is a deadly carbamate nerve agent. It is lethal because it inhibits acetylcholinesterase. Inhibition causes an overly high accumulation of acetylcholine between the nerve and muscle cells. This paralyzes the muscles by preventing their relaxation. The paralyzed muscles include those used for breathing.

Patent assigned to US Army for EA-4056 among other similar nerve agents was filed in December 7, 1967. It patents derivatives with 3 to 11 carbons in the connecting alkane chain.

== Lethality ==
Carbamates like EA-4056 are well absorbed by the lungs, gastrointestinal tracts, and the skin. Signs and symptoms from exposure to such carbamates are similar to other nerve agents. In general their penetration through the blood-brain barrier is difficult due to quaternary nitrogens in these molecules. Despite this, EA-4056 is claimed to be about three times more toxic than VX (another nerve agent). For VX, the median lethal dose (LD_{50}) for 70 kg men via exposure to the skin is estimated to be 10 mg, and the lethal concentration time (LCt_{50}), measuring the concentration of the vapor per length of time exposed, is estimated to be 30–50 mg·min/m^{3}. These values for EA-4056 can be estimated to be 3.3 mg and 10–16.7 mg·min/m^{3} by division.

Intravenous LD_{50} for EA-4056 is 0.0011 mg/kg for mice and 0.0027 mg/kg for rabbits.

== Properties ==
EA-4056's CAS is 110913-96-7, mass 732.6 g/mol, melting point 100–105 °C, and it is soluble in water and alcohols. It is a crystalline solid. EA-4056 evaporates slowly in to the air; thus it can be classified as being extremely persistent in the environment if any possible effects of external factors like sun light and water (air humidity) upon it are neglected. Various other salts than just bromine salts have been reported.

== Synthesis ==
2-dimethylaminomethyl-3-dimethylcarbamoxypyridine precursor is prepared. It is made via Mannich reaction by using 3-pyridol (CAS 109-00-2), dimethylamine and formaldehyde. Resulting 2-((Dimethylamino)methyl)pyridin-3-ol (CAS 2168-13-0) is then carbamoylated with dimethylcarbamoyl chloride. For a different product other secondary amines than dimethylamine can be used; such as those containing methyl, ethyl, propyl, isopropyl, butyl and benzyl groups.

2 moles of 2-dimethylaminomethyl-3-dimethylcarbamoxypyridine and app. 1 mol α,ω-dihaloalkane (e.g. 1,9-dibromononane in this case) in acetonitrile is heated on a steam bath for 6 hours. It is then allowed to stand overnight at room temperature. The crystalline product is collected by filtration and then triturated with acetone. If no solid separates, ethyl acetate is added to precipitate the crude product. The product is then dissolved in hot ethanol and treated with decolorizing charcoal. Ethyl acetate is added to the filtered solution to precipitate the crystalline product. E-4056 product is then collected and dried. Yield is 95%.

Other stable salts of EA-4056 than bromide can be made such as sulfate, nitrate, hydride, oxalate and perchlorate. Other α,ω-dihaloalkanes can be used to obtain similar molecules with different carbon chain lengths.

== See also ==
- 3152 CT
- EA-3887
- EA-3966
- EA-3990
- T-1123
