= EA-1356 =

Names
- Preferred IUPAC name 2-Methylcyclohexyl methylphosphonofluoridate
- Other names Methyl cyclosarin

Identifiers
CAS Number	85473-32-1
3D model (JSmol)	Interactive image
ChemSpider	162952
PubChem CID	187443
CompTox Dashboard (EPA)	DTXSID301006016
- InChI: InChI=1S/C8H16FO2P/c1-7-5-3-4-6-8(7)11-12(2,9)10/h7-8H,3-6H2,1-2H3 Key: YBZCCTLVJWWETH-UHFFFAOYSA-N
- SMILES: CC1CCCCC1OP(=O)(C)F

Properties
Chemical formula	C_{8}H_{16}FO_{2}P
Molar mass	194.186 g·mol^{−1}
- Except where otherwise noted, data are given for materials in their standard state (at 25 °C [77 °F], 100 kPa). Infobox references

EA-1356 is a G-series organophosphate nerve agent closely related to sarin. It is highly resistant to enzymatic degradation in the body. The nerve agent was tested at Edgewood Arsenal in Maryland (the "EA" in "EA-1356") among many other chemicals tested on humans. A novel enzyme was patented by the US Army in 2018 to break down EA-1356. It is a schedule 1 substance within the Chemical Weapons Convention. It is under the category of munitions of ML7.b.1.a.
