= TL-1238 =

Chemical compound

Names
- Preferred IUPAC name 3-[(Dimethylcarbamoyl)oxy]-N,N-diethyl-N-methylanilinium iodide
- Other names Substance 3393

Identifiers
CAS Number	6249-65-6
3D model (JSmol)	Interactive image
ChemSpider	21206
PubChem CID	22621
UNII	9ASN7N3BZ5
CompTox Dashboard (EPA)	DTXSID60978074
- InChI: InChI=1S/C14H23N2O2.HI/c1-6-16(5,7-2)12-9-8-10-13(11-12)18-14(17)15(3)4;/h8-11H,6-7H2,1-5H3;1H/q+1;/p-1 Key: HBVVWBFVSLUJNP-UHFFFAOYSA-M
- SMILES: CC[N+](C)(CC)c1cccc(c1)OC(=O)N(C)C.[I-]

Properties
Chemical formula	C_{14}H_{23}IN_{2}O_{2}
Molar mass	378.254 g·mol^{−1}

Hazards
- Occupational safety and health (OHS/OSH)
Main hazards	Extremely toxic
- Lethal dose or concentration (LD, LC)
LD_{50} (median dose)	175 μg/kg (subcutaneous, mice); 89 μg/kg (intravenous, mice); 60 μg/kg (intravenous, mice)
- Except where otherwise noted, data are given for materials in their standard state (at 25 °C [77 °F], 100 kPa). Infobox references

TL-1238 (Substance 3393) is an extremely potent carbamate acetylcholinesterase inhibitor. It has been shown to be more potent than the parent compound neostigmine.

== See also ==
- Miotine
- Neostigmine
- T-1123
- T-1152
- T-1194
- TL-599
