= 3152 CT =

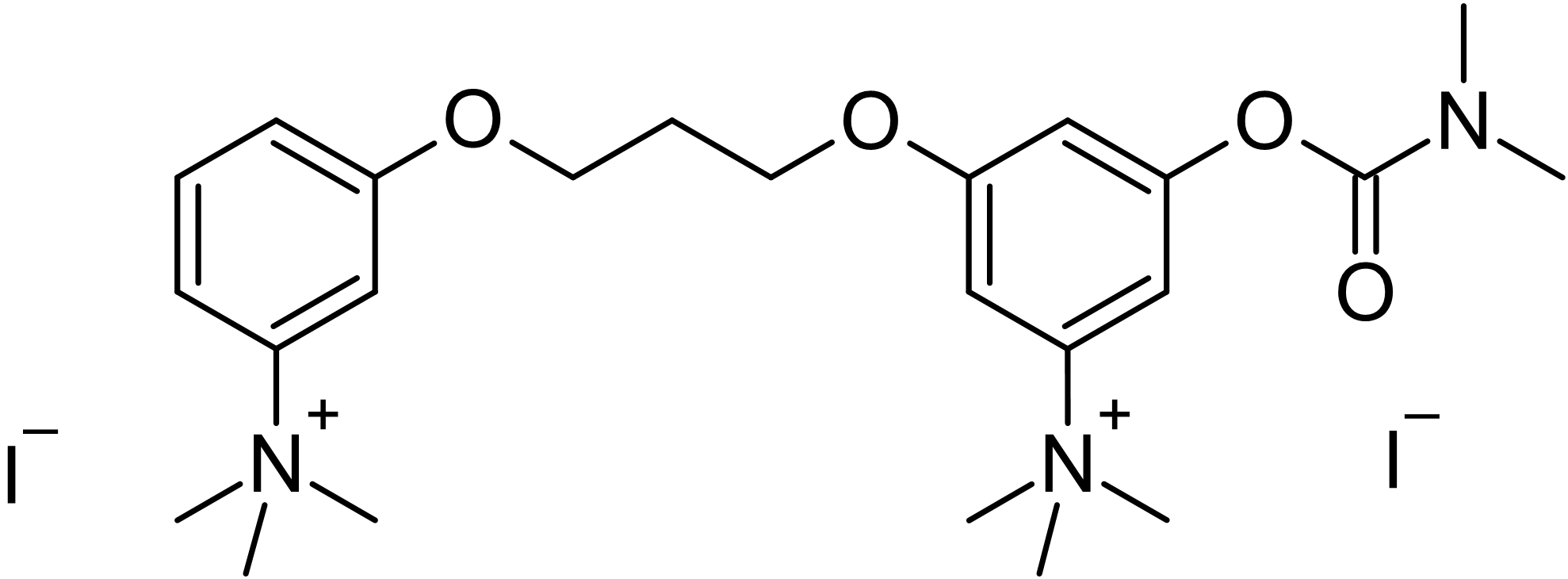

Names
- Preferred IUPAC name 3-[(Dimethylcarbamoyl)oxy]-N,N,N-trimethyl-5-{3-[3-(trimethylazaniumyl)phenoxy]propoxy}anilinium diiodide

Identifiers
3D model (JSmol)	Interactive image
- InChI: InChI=1S/C18H23N3O4.2HI/c1-21(2)18(22)25-17-11-14(20)10-16(12-17)24-8-4-7-23-15-6-3-5-13(19)9-15;;/h3,5-6,9-12H,4,7-8,19-20H2,1-2H3;2*1H Key: KDBKYZAHSYSXLC-UHFFFAOYSA-N
- SMILES: [NH3+]c(c1)cccc1OCCCOc(cc([NH3+])c2)cc2OC(=O)N(C)C.[I-].[I-]

Properties
Chemical formula	C_{24}H_{37}I_{2}N_{3}O_{4}
Molar mass	685.386 g·mol^{−1}
Appearance	Solid
Melting point	182–184 °C (360–363 °F; 455–457 K)

Hazards
- Lethal dose or concentration (LD, LC)
LD_{50} (median dose)	16 μg/kg (intravenous, mice); 8 μg/kg (intravenous, rabbits)
- Except where otherwise noted, data are given for materials in their standard state (at 25 °C [77 °F], 100 kPa). Infobox references

3152 CT is an extremely toxic bisquaternary carbamate with powerful anticholinesterase action. It has an LD_{50} in rats and rabbits 10 times lower than that of the GB agent and, on a molar basis, is 30 times more toxic than the latter.

== See also ==
- EA-3966
- EA-3990
- EA-4056
- T-1123
