= 1,8-Dibromooctane =

Names
- Preferred IUPAC name 1,8-Dibromooctane

Identifiers
CAS Number	4549-32-0
3D model (JSmol)	Interactive image
ChemSpider	70682
ECHA InfoCard	100.022.648
EC Number	224-912-5
PubChem CID	78310
UNII	ES9U6BR88X
CompTox Dashboard (EPA)	DTXSID5063520
- InChI: InChI=1S/C8H16Br2/c9-7-5-3-1-2-4-6-8-10/h1-8H2 Key: DKEGCUDAFWNSSO-UHFFFAOYSA-N
- SMILES: C(CCCCBr)CCCBr

Properties
Chemical formula	C_{8}H_{16}Br_{2}
Molar mass	272.024 g·mol^{−1}
Melting point	12–16 °C (54–61 °F; 285–289 K)
Boiling point	270–272 °C (518–522 °F; 543–545 K)

Hazards
- GHS labelling
Pictograms	(GHS07: Exclamation mark)
Signal word	Warning
Hazard statements	H315, H319, H335
Precautionary statements	P261, P264, P271, P280, P302+P352, P304+P340, P305+P351+P338, P312, P321, P332+P313, P337+P313, P362, P403+P233, P405, P501
- Except where otherwise noted, data are given for materials in their standard state (at 25 °C [77 °F], 100 kPa). Infobox references

1,8-Dibromooctane is a chemical compound used in the synthesis of the carbamate nerve agents EA-3990 and octamethylene-bis(5-dimethylcarbamoxyisoquinolinium bromide) and also in the synthesis of sebacic acid.
