= TMTFA =

Chemical compound

Names
- Preferred IUPAC name N,N,N-Trimethyl-3-(trifluoroacetyl)anilinium

Identifiers
CAS Number	156781-80-5; 70311-60-3 (iodide salt)
3D model (JSmol)	Interactive image
ChemSpider	5291
PubChem CID	5492
UNII	Z3M6Q7J3MZ
CompTox Dashboard (EPA)	DTXSID20274468
- InChI: InChI=1S/C11H13F3NO/c1-15(2,3)9-6-4-5-8(7-9)10(16)11(12,13)14/h4-7H,1-3H3/q+1 Key: JIBZSTPMDKSJOX-UHFFFAOYSA-N
- SMILES: C[N+](C)(C)C1=CC=CC(=C1)C(=O)C(F)(F)F

Properties
Chemical formula	C_{11}H_{13}F_{3}NO
Molar mass	232.226 g·mol^{−1}

Hazards
- Lethal dose or concentration (LD, LC)
LD_{50} (median dose)	1.6 mg/kg (intraperitoneal, mice) (as iodide salt)
- Except where otherwise noted, data are given for materials in their standard state (at 25 °C [77 °F], 100 kPa). Infobox references

TMTFA is an extremely potent acetylcholinesterase inhibitor. As a transition state analog of acetylcholinesterase, TMTFA is able to inhibit acetylcholinesterase at extremely low concentrations (within the femtomolar range), making it one of the most potent acetylcholinesterase inhibitors known.

== Mechanism of action ==
TMTFA has a reactive ketone group that can covalently bind to the serine residue in the active site of acetylcholinesterase. This is due to the electron-withdrawing trifluoromethyl group on the carbonyl group.

== See also ==
- Acetylcholinesterase inhibitor
- Methylfluorophosphonylcholine
- Transition state analog
