= Dimethylamidophosphoric dichloride =

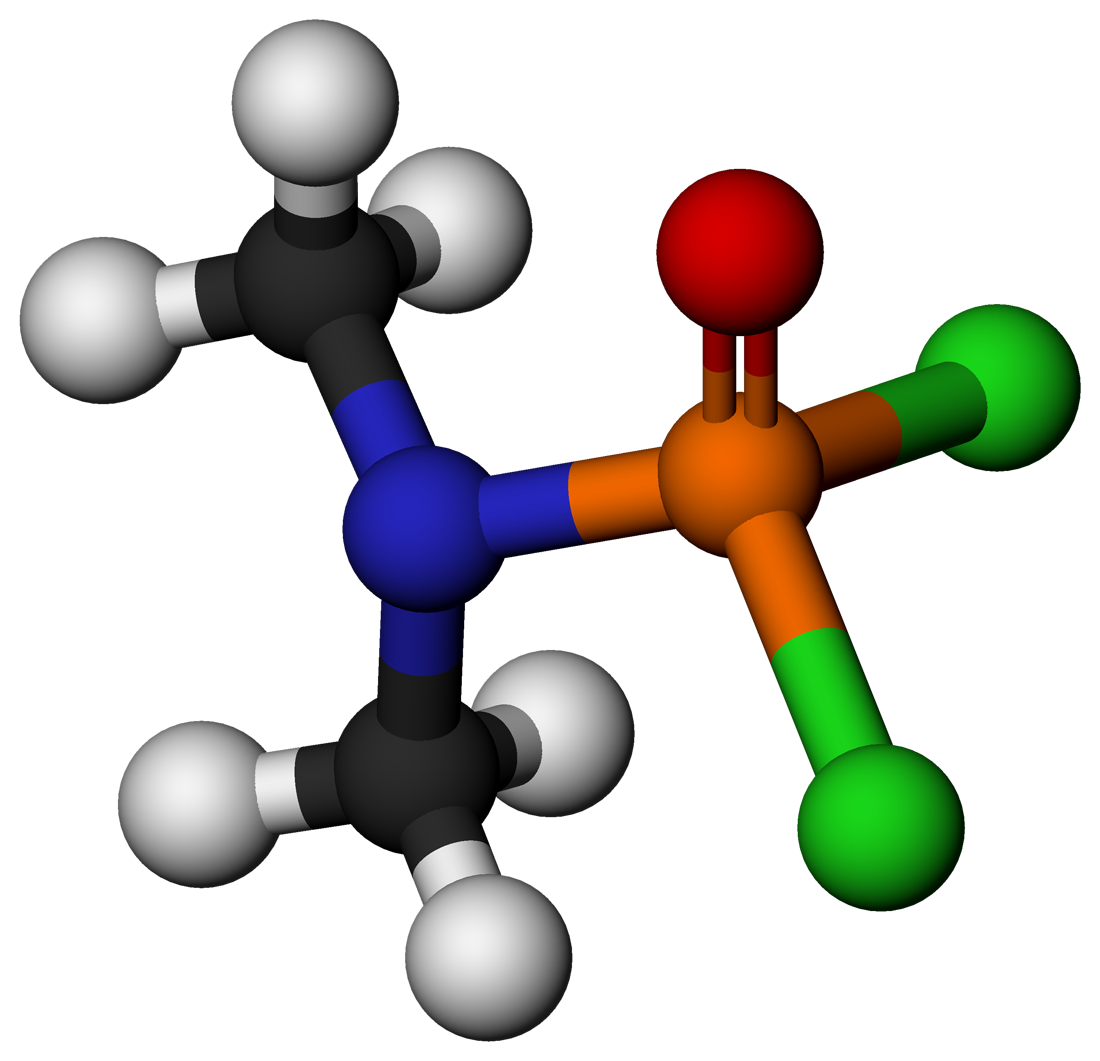
- Dimethyl amidophosphoric dichloride 3D balls

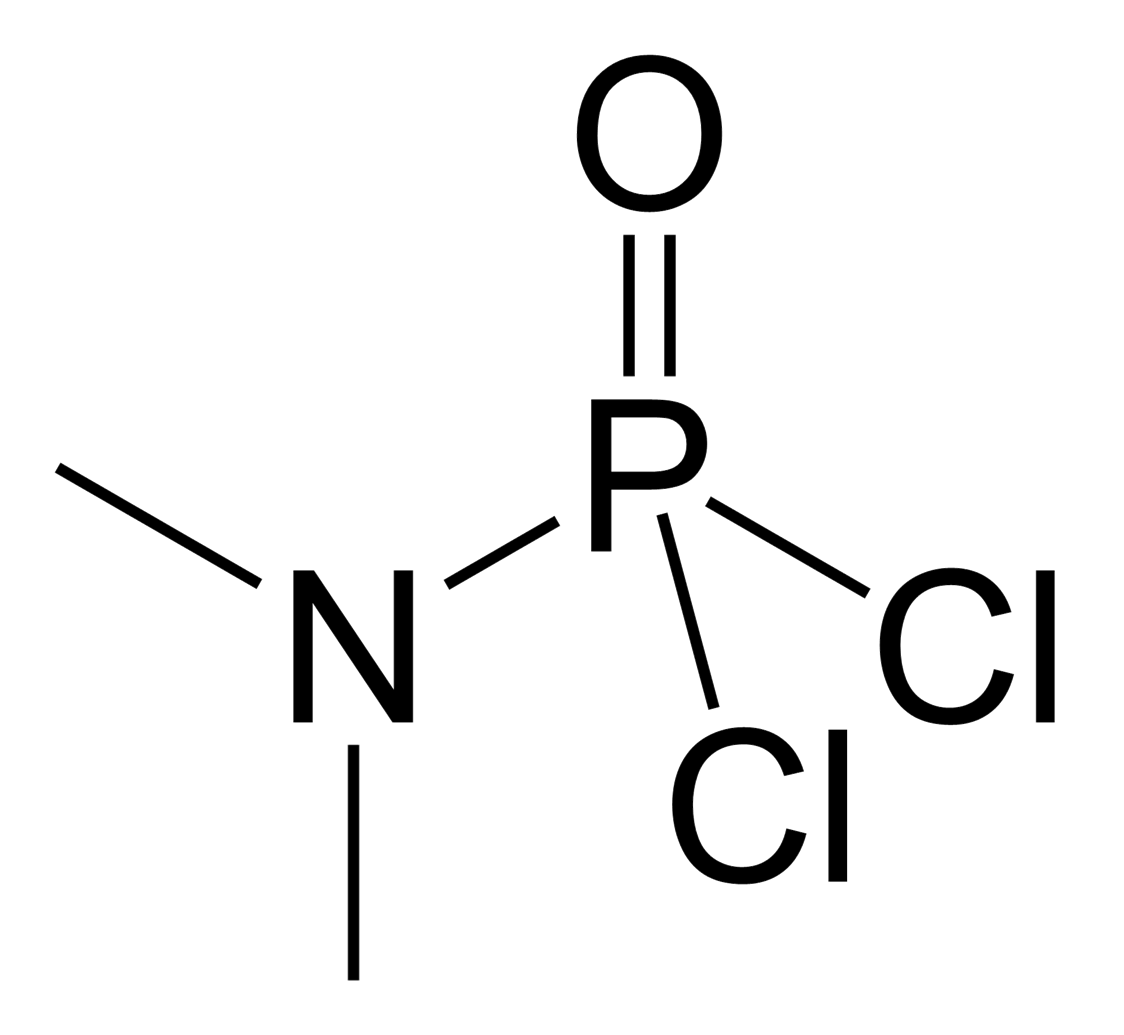
- Dimethylamidophosphoric dichloride 2D skeletal

Names
- IUPAC name N-Dichlorophosphoryl-N-methylmethanamine
- Other names (Dimethylamido)phosphoryl dichloride N,N-Dimethylphosphoramidodichloridate

Identifiers
CAS Number	677-43-0
3D model (JSmol)	Interactive image
ChemSpider	12152
PubChem CID	12673
UNII	XG32RK7L5Q
CompTox Dashboard (EPA)	DTXSID4074801
- InChI: InChI=1S/C2H6Cl2NOP/c1-5(2)7(3,4)6/h1-2H3 Key: YNHXBEVSSILHPI-UHFFFAOYSA-N
- SMILES: CN(C)P(=O)(Cl)Cl

Properties
Chemical formula	C_{2}H_{6}Cl_{2}NOP
Molar mass	161.95 g·mol^{−1}
Melting point	< 0 °C (32 °F; 273 K)

Hazards
- GHS labelling
Pictograms	(GHS05: Corrosive) (GHS06: Toxic) (GHS09: Environmental hazard)
Signal word	Danger
Hazard statements	H314
Precautionary statements	P260, P264, P280, P301+P330+P331, P303+P361+P353, P304+P340, P305+P351+P338, P310, P321, P363, P405, P501
NFPA 704 (fire diamond)	3 3 2 W
- Except where otherwise noted, data are given for materials in their standard state (at 25 °C [77 °F], 100 kPa). Infobox references

Dimethylamidophosphoric dichloride is a chemical used in industrial applications. It is used for synthesizing phosphoramidates as well as tabun, which is used as a chemical weapon.

== Safety ==
Due to its nature, this chemical is corrosive, flammable, and neurotoxic if ingested or absorbed through the skin. In contact with water, it is expected to give off hydrogen chloride and dimethylamidophosphoric acid vapors.

== History ==
First synthesis of the substance dates back to turn of the 19th century, when a student of German chemistry professor August Michaelis Ernst Ratzlaff made dimethylamidophosphoric dichloride as well as its diethyl analog for experiments of another PhD student of Michaelis Adolph Schall. He obtained a PhD at University of Rostock with a thesis titled Über die Einwirkung primärer und sekundärer Amine auf Phosphoroxychlorid und Äthoxylphosphoroxychlorid later in 1901. The high toxicity of the substance (as well as the high toxicity of ethyl diethylaminocyanophosphonate, an analog of tabun synthesised by Schall) wasn't noticed at the time, most likely due to the low yield of synthetic reactions used.

== See also ==
- Organophosphate poisoning
