= Trituration =

Production of a homogeneous material by mixing its components thoroughly

Trituration (Latin, grinding) is the name of several different methods used to process materials. In one sense, it is a form of comminution (reducing the particle size of a substance). In another sense, it is the production of a homogeneous powdered material by mixing and grinding component materials thoroughly. For example, a dental amalgam is formed by combining particles of a metal, usually gold or silver, with mercury.

- In organic chemistry, trituration is a process used to purify crude chemical compounds containing soluble impurities. A solvent is chosen in which the desired product is insoluble and the undesired by-products are very soluble or vice versa. For example, when the impurities are soluble and the desired product is not, the crude material is washed with the solvent and filtered, leaving the purified product in solid form and any impurities in solution. If mixed solvents are used, target compound and impurities are first dissolved in small amount of solvent, and then addition of another solvent causes desired compound to precipitate. This can be considered a crude form of recrystallization performed without changes in temperature.
- In developmental, cell, and molecular biology, trituration is the process of fragmenting of solid material (often biological tissue or aggregated material) into smaller components (often, respectively, cells or molecules in suspension/solution) by means of repeated passage through a pipette.
- In pharmacy, trituration can also refer to the process of grinding one compound into another to dilute one of the ingredients, add volume for processing and handling, or to mask undesirable qualities. For example, the amount of hormone in a dose of Levonorgestrel formulated as a progestogen-only contraceptive is only 30μg, which is far too small to handle. In a typical product, the drug is triturated with c. 1700 times its mass of sugar before being compressed and coated to produce the final tablet.
- In juicing, a triturating juicer is a style of juicer used to break down fresh produce into juice and fiber.
- In homeopathy, a trituration is a mixture, often with lactose, of a substance that is not water-soluble.
