= Tabun (nerve agent) =

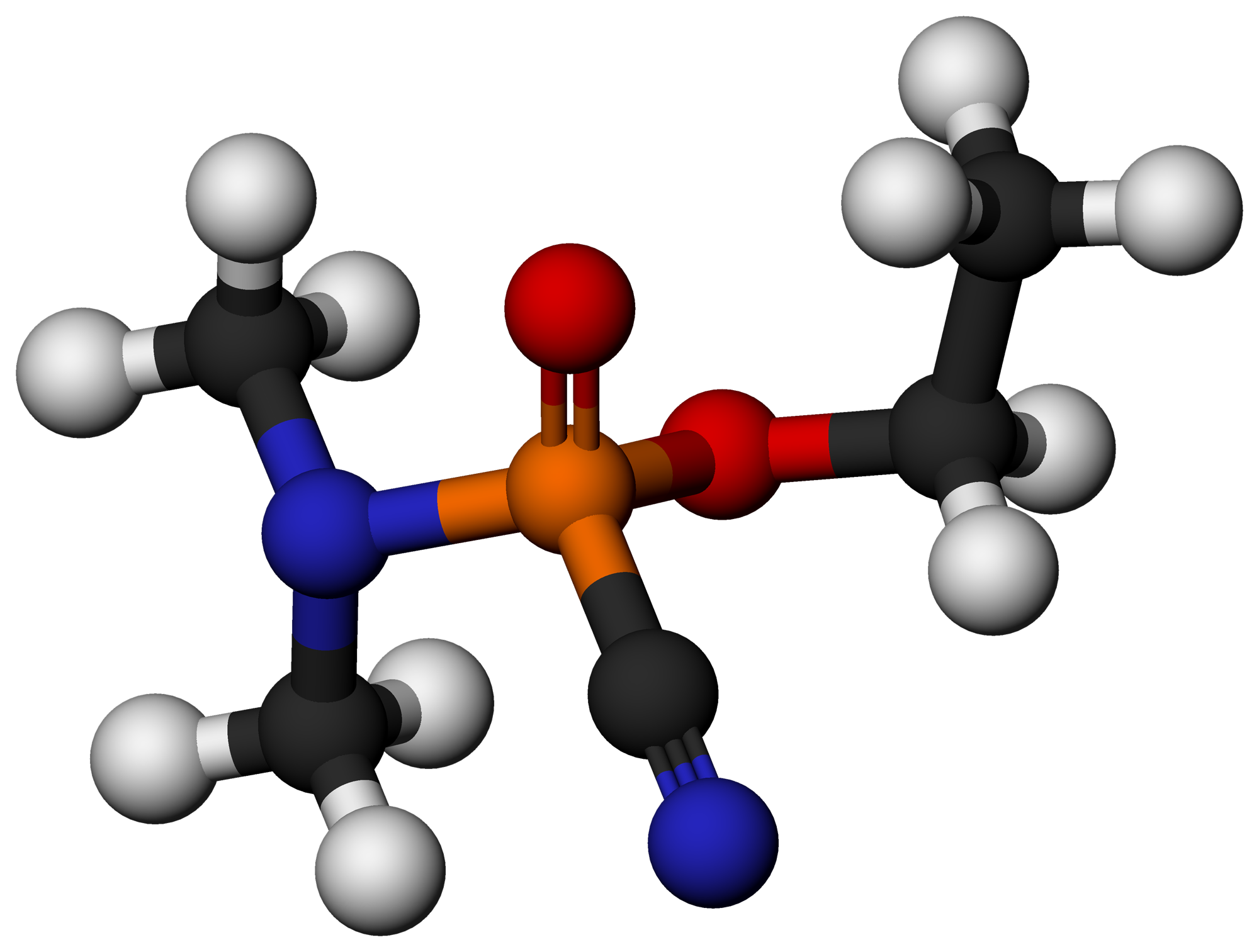

Names
- IUPAC name (RS)-Ethyl N,N-Dimethylphosphoramidocyanidate
- Other names GA; Ethyl dimethylphosphoramidocyanidate; Dimethylaminoethoxy-cyanophosphine oxide; Dimethylamidoethoxyphosphoryl cyanide; Ethyl dimethylaminocyanophosphonate; Ethyl ester of dimethylphosphoroamidocyanidic acid; Ethyl phosphorodimethylamidocyanidate; Cyanodimethylaminoethoxyphosphine oxide; Dimethylaminoethodycyanophosphine oxide; EA-1205; TL-1578

Identifiers
| CAS Number | 77-81-6 |
| 3D model (JSmol) | Interactive image |
| ChEMBL | ChEMBL1097650 |
| ChemSpider | 6254 |
| ECHA InfoCard | 100.296.240 |
| PubChem CID | 6500 |
| UNII | S45M750QSH |
| CompTox Dashboard (EPA) | DTXSID80861631 |
- InChI: InChI=1S/C5H11N2O2P/c1-4-9-10(8,5-6)7(2)3/h4H2,1-3H3 Key: PJVJTCIRVMBVIA-UHFFFAOYSA-N; InChI=1/C5H11N2O2P/c1-4-9-10(8,5-6)7(2)3/h4H2,1-3H3 Key: PJVJTCIRVMBVIA-UHFFFAOYAG
- SMILES: N#CP(=O)(OCC)N(C)C

Properties
| Chemical formula | C_{5}H_{11}N_{2}O_{2}P |
| Molar mass | 162.129 g·mol^{−1} |
| Appearance | Colorless to brown liquid |
| Density | 1.0887 g/cm^{3} at 25 °C; 1.102 g/cm^{3} at 20 °C |
| Melting point | −50 °C (−58 °F; 223 K) |
| Boiling point | 247.5 °C (477.5 °F; 520.6 K) |
| Solubility in water | 9.8 g/100 g at 25 °C; 7.2 g/100 g at 20 °C |
| Vapor pressure | 0.07 mmHg (9 Pa) |

Hazards
- Occupational safety and health (OHS/OSH)
| Main hazards | Highly toxic. Fires involving this chemical may result in the formation of hydrogen cyanide |
| NFPA 704 (fire diamond) | 4 2 1 |
| Flash point | 78 °C (172 °F; 351 K) |
- Except where otherwise noted, data are given for materials in their standard state (at 25 °C [77 °F], 100 kPa). verify (what is ?) Infobox references

Tabun (NATO designation GA) is an extremely toxic compound and nerve agent chemical weapon of the organophosphate family. It is not present in nature. At room temperature, the pure compound is a clear and viscous liquid. However, impurities imparted during its manufacture are almost always present, turning it yellow or brown. Exposed to environs, it slowly evaporates into the atmosphere, with the vapor having a slight fruity or almond-like odor. As the compound has a much higher molecular mass (162 g/mol) than air, tabun gas tends to accumulate in low-lying areas.

It is a potent inhibitor of acetylcholinesterase, a key enzyme within the human body as well as in other animals. Acetylcholinesterase is responsible for breaking down acetylcholine, a neurotransmitter released into the synaptic cleft by motor neurons. The presence of acetylcholine within the cleft signals the post-synaptic (downstream) motor neuron to contract the neuron's associated muscle fibers, and vice versa. By irreversibly phosphorylating the enzyme, tabun accomplishes a constant and involuntary contraction of the affected muscles, as the acetylcholine is not recycled and continues to build up within the cleft. Death of the organism ensues when respiratory muscles, such as the diaphragm and intercostals, become exhausted and paralyzed from constant contraction, leading to loss of respiratory functions.

Tabun was the first nerve agent discovered, in 1936 by Gerhard Schrader in Nazi Germany, and named after the German word Tabu (taboo) for its extreme toxicity. The country stockpiled over 12,000 tons of the weapon, but it was not used for fear of Allied retaliation. After the war, the Western Allies and Soviet Union both discovered the agent, and nerve agent production became central to the Soviet and United States chemical weapons programs in the Cold War. Tabun was impractical, with the countries focusing on sarin, soman, and VX nerve agents instead. Tabun was only known to have been used in the extensive Iraqi chemical attacks of the Iran–Iraq War.

Production and storage of tabun has been strictly regulated under the Chemical Weapons Convention and its implementing agency OPCW since 1997. As a Schedule 1 Toxic Chemical, the synthesis of more than 100 grams of the substance per year must be declared to the organization, and no signatory nation can possess more than one ton of the chemical. Modern usage of Tabun is limited to research purposes in minute amounts.

== Chemistry and synthesis ==
=== Reactions ===
Tabun can be deactivated chemically using common oxidizing agents such as sodium hypochlorite.

=== Historic synthesis ===
Tabun was made on an industrial scale by Germany during World War II based on a process developed by Gerhard Schrader. In the chemical agent factory in Dyhernfurth an der Oder, code-named "Hochwerk", at least 12,000 metric tons of this agent were manufactured between 1942 and 1945. The manufacturing process consisted of two steps (see below); after the reactions, the mixture (consisting of ~75% solvent, ~25% desired product, plus insoluble salts and reactants) was filtered and vacuum-distilled. This yielded a technical product consisting either of 95% or 80% tabun (then known as Tabun A or B, respectively, the second a product later in the war).

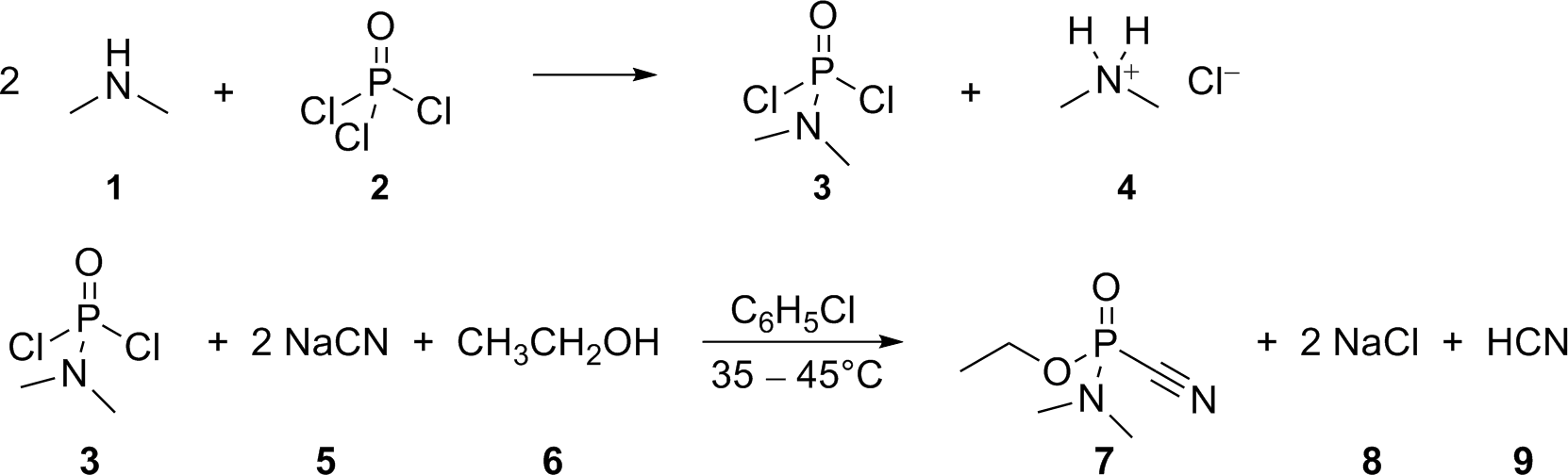

== Effects of exposure ==
The symptoms of exposure include: nervousness/restlessness, miosis (contraction of the pupil), rhinorrhea (runny nose), excessive salivation, dyspnea (difficulty in breathing due to bronchoconstriction/secretions), sweating, bradycardia (slow heartbeat), loss of consciousness, convulsions, flaccid paralysis, loss of bladder and bowel control, apnea (breathing stopped) and lung blisters. The symptoms of exposure are similar to those created by all nerve agents. Tabun is toxic even in minute doses. The number and severity of symptoms which appear vary according to the amount of the agent absorbed and rate of entry of it into the body. Very small skin dosages sometimes cause local sweating and tremors accompanied with characteristically constricted pupils with few other effects. Tabun is about half as toxic as sarin by inhalation, but in very low concentrations it is more irritating to the eyes than sarin. Tabun also breaks down slowly, which after repeated exposure can lead to build up in the body.

The effects of tabun appear slowly when tabun is absorbed through the skin rather than inhaled. A victim may absorb a lethal dose quickly, although death may be delayed for one to two hours. A person's clothing can release the toxic chemical for up to 30 minutes after exposure. Inhaled lethal dosages kill in one to ten minutes, and liquid absorbed through the eyes kills almost as quickly. However, people who experience mild to moderate exposure to tabun can recover completely, if treated almost as soon as exposure occurs. The median lethal dose (LD_{50}) for tabun is about 400 mg-min/m^{3}.

The lethal dose for a man is about .01 mg/kg. The median lethal dose for respiration is 400 mg-minute/m3 for humans. When absorbed via the skin, death may occur in 1-2 minutes, or it can take up to two hours.

Treatment for suspected tabun poisoning is often three injections of a nerve agent antidote, such as atropine. Pralidoxime chloride (2-PAM Cl) also works as an antidote; however, it must be administered within minutes to a few hours following exposure to be effective.

== History ==
Research into ethyl dialkylaminocyanophosphonate began in the late 19th century. In 1898, Adolph Schall, a graduate student at the University of Rostock under professor August Michaelis, synthesised the diethylamino analog of tabun, as part of his PhD thesis Über die Einwirkung von Phosphoroxybromid auf secundäre aliphatische Amine. However, Schall incorrectly identified the structure of the substance as an imidoether, and Michaelis corrected him in a 1903 article in Liebigs Annalen, Über die organischen Verbindungen des Phosphors mit dem Stickstoff. The high toxicity of the substance (as well as the high toxicity of its precursors, diethylamidophosphoric dichloride and dimethylamidophosphoric dichloride) wasn't noted at the time, most likely due to the low yield of the synthetic reactions used.

Tabun became the first nerve agent known after a property of this chemical was discovered by pure accident in late December 1936 by German researcher Gerhard Schrader. Schrader was experimenting with a class of compounds called organophosphates, which kill insects by interrupting their nervous systems, to create a more effective insecticide for IG Farben, a German chemical and pharmaceutical industry conglomerate, at Elberfeld. The substance he discovered, as well as being a potent insecticide, was enormously toxic to humans; hence, it was named tabun, to indicate that the substance was 'taboo' (German: tabu) for its intended purpose.

During World War II, a plant for the manufacture of tabun was established at Dyhernfurth (now Brzeg Dolny, Poland), in 1939. Run by Anorgana GmbH, the plant began production of the substance in 1942. The reason for the delay was the extreme precautions used by the plant. Intermediate products of tabun were corrosive, and had to be contained in quartz or silver-lined vessels. Tabun itself was also highly toxic, and final reactions were conducted behind double glass walls. Large scale manufacturing of the agent resulted in problems with tabun's degradation over time, and only 12,753 metric tons were manufactured before the plant was seized by the Soviet Army. The plant initially produced shells and aerial bombs using a 95:5 mix of tabun and chlorobenzene, designated "Variant A". In the latter half of the war, the plant switched to "Variant B", an 80:20 mix of tabun and chlorobenzene designed for easier dispersion. The Soviets dismantled the plant and shipped it to Russia. They did not inform the Western Allies of the discovery and as a result they did not become aware of tabun until it was discovered in captured German ammo dumps in April 1945.

During the Nuremberg Trials, Albert Speer, Minister of Armaments and War Production for the Third Reich, testified that he had planned to kill Adolf Hitler in early 1945 by introducing tabun into the Führerbunker ventilation shaft. He said his efforts were frustrated by the impracticality of tabun and his lack of ready access to a replacement nerve agent, and also by the unexpected construction of a tall chimney that put the air intake out of reach.

The US once considered repurposing captured German stocks of tabun (GA) prior to production of sarin (GB). Like the other Allied governments, the Soviets soon abandoned tabun (GA) for sarin (GB) and soman (GD). The German magazine Spiegel reported in 2007 that after World War II, "the United States dumped around half a million Tabun bombs in the Skagerrak in the northern Baltic" sea. The United Kingdom held 14,000 tons of ordnance containing tabun captured from Germany, which it stored in north Wales. Under the 1954 Operation Sandcastle, these munitions were sunk in three ships northwest of Ireland.

Since GA is much easier to produce than the other G-series weapons and the process is comparatively widely understood, countries that develop a nerve agent capability but lack advanced industrial facilities often start by producing GA.

During the Iran–Iraq War of 1980 to 1988, Iraq used chemical weapons against civilians and Iranian forces. Although the most commonly used agents were mustard gas and sarin, tabun and cyclosarin were also used. Tabun was the first nerve agent used in conflict, by Iraq against Iranian troops, on 17 March 1984 near Basra. Operation Kheibar occurred in that period and area. Tabun was also used in the 1988 Halabja chemical attack.

Producing or stockpiling tabun was banned by the 1993 Chemical Weapons Convention. The worldwide stockpiles declared under the convention were 2 tonnes, and as of December 2015 these stockpiles had been destroyed.

== See also ==
- Cyclosarin (GF)
- Deseret Chemical Depot – where the remaining US stockpile was destroyed
- Operation Sandcastle – dumping of World War II German tabun bombs by the UK in 1955–1956
- Francis E. Dec - Schizophrenic and World War II veteran, spoke about the "Tabin Needle" in rants

== Bibliography ==
- Speer, Albert (1970), Inside the Third Reich, translated by Richard Winston; Clara Winston, New York and Toronto: Macmillan, ISBN 978-0-297-00015-0, LCCN 70119132. Republished in paperback in 1997 by Simon & Schuster, ISBN 978-0-684-82949-4
  (Original German edition: Speer, Albert (1969), Erinnerungen [Reminiscences], Berlin and Frankfurt am Main: Propyläen/Ullstein Verlag, OCLC 639475)
