= T-1123 =

Names
- Preferred IUPAC name N,N-Diethyl-N-methyl-3-[(methylcarbamoyl)oxy]anilinium iodide
- Other names AR-16, TL-1217

Identifiers
CAS Number	60398-22-3
3D model (JSmol)	Interactive image
ChemSpider	39424
PubChem CID	43257
CompTox Dashboard (EPA)	DTXSID00975800
- InChI: InChI=1S/C13H20N2O2.HI/c1-5-15(4,6-2)11-8-7-9-12(10-11)17-13(16)14-3;/h7-10H,5-6H2,1-4H3;1H Key: XYPQGNNSAIEXIS-UHFFFAOYSA-N
- SMILES: CC[N+](C)(CC)C1=CC(=CC=C1)OC(=O)NC.[I-]

Properties
Chemical formula	C_{13}H_{21}IN_{2}O_{2}
Molar mass	364.227 g·mol^{−1}

Related compounds
Related compounds	Neostigmine; Miotine

Hazards
- Lethal dose or concentration (LD, LC)
LD_{50} (median dose)	129 μg/kg (Subcutaneous, mice); 75 μg/kg (Subcutaneous, cats); 75 μg/kg (Subcutaneous, dogs); 150 μg/kg (Subcutaneous, rabbits); 122.5 μg/kg (Intramuscular, rats)
- Except where otherwise noted, data are given for materials in their standard state (at 25 °C [77 °F], 100 kPa). Infobox references

T-1123 is a carbamate-based acetylcholinesterase inhibitor. It was investigated as a chemical warfare agent starting in 1940. It does not go through the blood-brain barrier due to the charge on quaternary nitrogen. The antidote is atropine. T-1123 is a quaternary ammonium ion. A phenyl carbamate ester is bonded in the meta position to the nitrogen on a diethylmethyl amine. The chloride and methylsulfate salt of T-1123 is TL-1299 and TL-1317, respectively.

== Synthesis ==
T-1123 can be produced from m-diethylaminophenol, methyl isocyanate and methyl iodide. First, m-diethylaminophenol is reacted with methyl isocyanate to produce a methylcarbamate. The resulting methylcarbamate is then reacted with methyl iodide to produce T-1123.

== See also ==
- Miotine
- Neostigmine
- TL-1238
- T-1152
- T-1194
- TMTFA

== Extra reading ==
- Robinson, J. P. (1971). The Problem of Chemical and Biological Warfare: The rise of CB weapons. Almqvist & Wiksell. ISBN 9780391002005.
