= Huprine Y =

Acetylcholinesterase inhibitor

Names
- IUPAC name 7-chloro-15-methyl-10-azatetracyclo[11.3.1.02,11.04,9]heptadeca-2,4(9),5,7,10,14-hexaen-3-amine

Identifiers
3D model (JSmol)	Interactive image
ChEMBL	ChEMBL140476
ChemSpider	8283502
PubChem CID	10107976
- InChI: InChI=1S/C17H17ClN2/c1-9-4-10-6-11(5-9)16-15(7-10)20-14-8-12(18)2-3-13(14)17(16)19/h2-4,8,10-11H,5-7H2,1H3,(H2,19,20) Key: UKCBMHDZLYYTMI-UHFFFAOYSA-N
- SMILES: CC1=CC2CC(C1)C3=C(C4=C(C=C(C=C4)Cl)N=C3C2)N

Properties
Chemical formula	C_{17}H_{17}ClN_{2}
Molar mass	284.79 g·mol^{−1}
- Except where otherwise noted, data are given for materials in their standard state (at 25 °C [77 °F], 100 kPa). Infobox references

Huprine Y is an anticholinesterase compound. According to research, it could potentially have usefulness in management of certain diseases such as Alzheimer's disease.

== Chemistry ==
At the chemical level, huprine Y has a very similar structure to huprine X, another AChE inhibitor. This chemical similarity could explain their similar mechanisms of action.

== Mechanism of action ==
As an anticholinesterase compound, its main mechanism of action is inhibition of the acetylcholine esterase enzyme, which hydrolyses acetylcholine. In other words, huprine Y reduces the action of the AChE enzyme, resulting in elevated levels of acetylcholine. Like other similar compounds, it appears to have strong affinity when binding to the enzyme.
