= Tabernamine =

Identifiers
CAS Number	59626-92-5
3D model (JSmol)	Interactive image
ChemSpider	30791189
PubChem CID	5476758
- InChI: InChI=1S/C40H48N4O2/c1-5-23-15-22-16-32-37-28(13-14-44(20-22)39(23)32)27-12-11-25(17-34(27)42-37)30-18-29-24(6-2)21-43(3)35(36(29)40(45)46-4)19-31-26-9-7-8-10-33(26)41-38(30)31/h6-12,17,22-23,29-30,32,35-36,39,41-42H,5,13-16,18-21H2,1-4H3/b24-6- Key: MTARGWPMLJBYNG-UMDHDWCXSA-N
- SMILES: CCC1CC2CC3C1N(C2)CCC4=C3NC5=C4C=CC(=C5)C6CC\7C(C(CC8=C6NC9=CC=CC=C89)N(C/C7=C/C)C)C(=O)OC

Properties
Chemical formula	C_{40}H_{48}N_{4}O_{2}
Molar mass	616.850 g·mol^{−1}
- Except where otherwise noted, data are given for materials in their standard state (at 25 °C [77 °F], 100 kPa). Infobox references

Tabernamine is a bisindole isolate of Tabernaemontana with anticancer activity.

== Derivatives ==
19,20-dihydrotabernamine is said to have potent acetylcholinesterase inhibitor activity greater than galantamine.

== Notes ==
- Plant anticancer agents V: new bisindole alkaloids from Tabernaemontana johnstonii stem bark
