= EA-2054 =

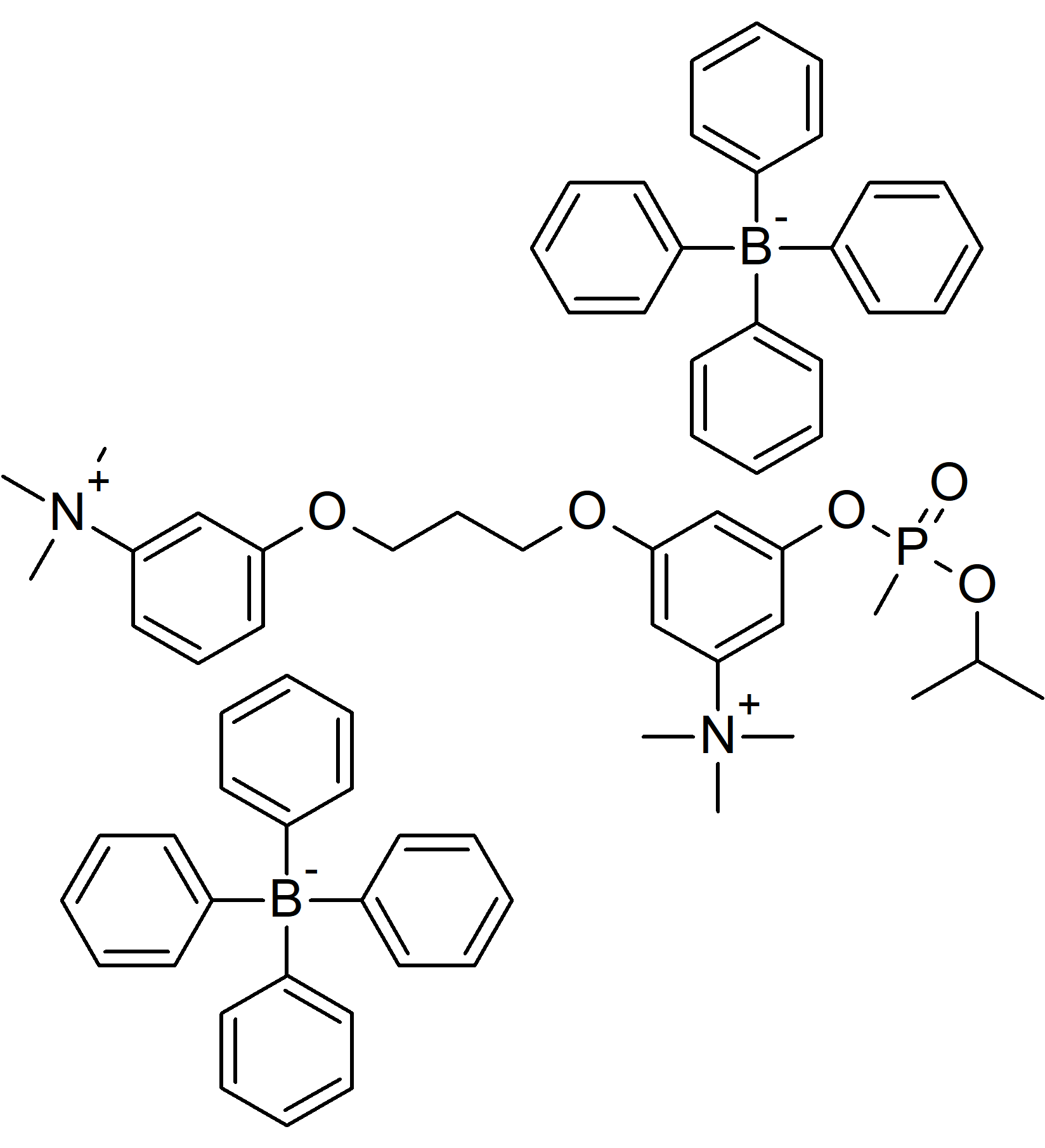

Names
- Preferred IUPAC name N,N,N-Trimethyl-3-({[(propan-2-yl)oxy](methylphosphonoyl)}oxy)-5-{3-[3-(trimethylazaniumyl)phenoxy]propoxy}anilinium bis(tetraphenylboranuide)

Identifiers
3D model (JSmol)	Interactive image
PubChem CID	165360151
CompTox Dashboard (EPA)	DTXSID101336439
- InChI: InChI=1S/C25H41N2O5P.2C24H20B/c1-20(2)31-33(9,28)32-25-18-22(27(6,7)8)17-24(19-25)30-15-11-14-29-23-13-10-12-21(16-23)26(3,4)5;2*1-5-13-21(14-6-1)25(22-15-7-2-8-16-22,23-17-9-3-10-18-23)24-19-11-4-12-20-24/h10,12-13,16-20H,11,14-15H2,1-9H3;2*1-20H/q+2;2*-1 Key: JVVQIPCTBBUOET-UHFFFAOYSA-N
- SMILES: [B-](c1ccccc1)(c2ccccc2)(c3ccccc3)c4ccccc4.[B-](c1ccccc1)(c2ccccc2)(c3ccccc3)c4ccccc4.CC(C)OP(=O)(C)Oc5cc([N+](C)(C)C)cc(c5)OCCCOc6cccc(c6)[N+](C)(C)C

Properties
Chemical formula	C_{73}H_{81}B_{2}N_{2}O_{5}P
Molar mass	1119.05 g·mol^{−1}
Appearance	Solid
Melting point	97–100 °C (207–212 °F; 370–373 K)
Solubility in water	Insoluble
Solubility	Soluble in acetone

Hazards
- Occupational safety and health (OHS/OSH)
Main hazards	Extremely toxic
- Lethal dose or concentration (LD, LC)
LD_{50} (median dose)	74 μg/kg (Rats, IV); 15 μg/kg (Rabbits, IV)
- Except where otherwise noted, data are given for materials in their standard state (at 25 °C [77 °F], 100 kPa). Infobox references

EA-2054 is an extremely toxic organophosphate nerve agent. It is an extremely potent acetylcholinesterase inhibitor that is resistant to atropine and oxime treatment.

== See also ==
- Nerve agent
- EA-2012
- EA-2098
- EA-2613
