= EA-2012 =

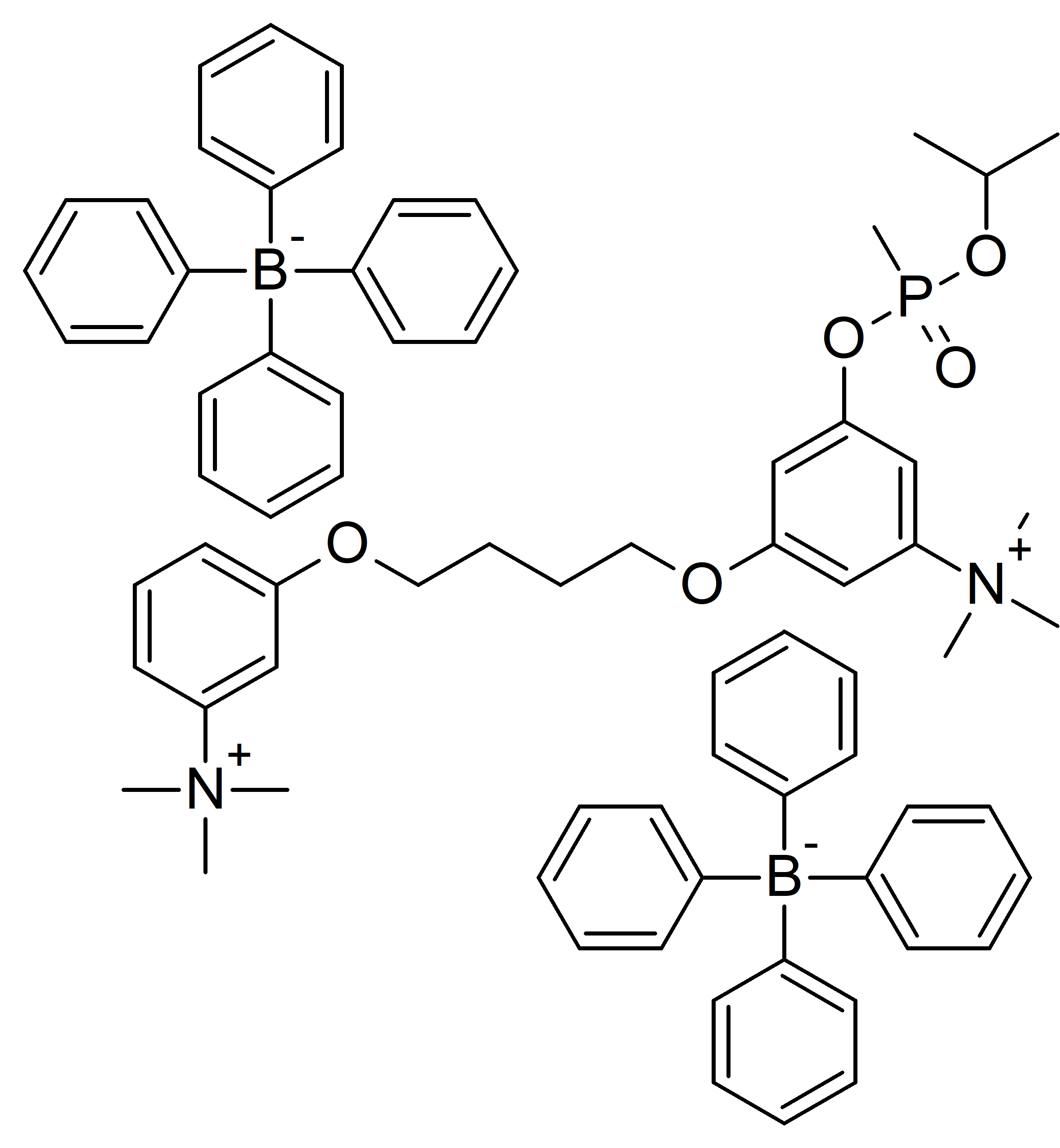

Names
- Preferred IUPAC name Bis(tetraphenylboranuide) N,N,N-trimethyl-3-({[(propan-2-yl)oxy](methylphosphonoyl)}oxy)-5-{4-[3-(trimethylazaniumyl)phenoxy]butoxy}anilinium

Identifiers
3D model (JSmol)	Interactive image
PubChem CID	165360149
CompTox Dashboard (EPA)	DTXSID401336438
- InChI: InChI=1S/C26H43N2O5P.2C24H20B/c1-21(2)32-34(9,29)33-26-19-23(28(6,7)8)18-25(20-26)31-16-11-10-15-30-24-14-12-13-22(17-24)27(3,4)5;2*1-5-13-21(14-6-1)25(22-15-7-2-8-16-22,23-17-9-3-10-18-23)24-19-11-4-12-20-24/h12-14,17-21H,10-11,15-16H2,1-9H3;2*1-20H/q+2;2*-1 Key: UBOLPSQXNCTHEF-UHFFFAOYSA-N
- SMILES: [B-](c1ccccc1)(c2ccccc2)(c3ccccc3)c4ccccc4.[B-](c1ccccc1)(c2ccccc2)(c3ccccc3)c4ccccc4.CC(C)OP(=O)(C)Oc5cc([N+](C)(C)C)cc(c5)OCCCCOc6cccc(c6)[N+](C)(C)C

Properties
Chemical formula	C_{74}H_{83}B_{2}N_{2}O_{5}P
Molar mass	1133.08 g·mol^{−1}
Appearance	Solid
Melting point	171–172 °C (340–342 °F; 444–445 K)
Solubility in water	Insoluble
Solubility	Soluble in acetone

Hazards
- Occupational safety and health (OHS/OSH)
Main hazards	Extremely toxic
- Lethal dose or concentration (LD, LC)
LD_{50} (median dose)	93 μg/kg (Rats, IV); 17 μg/kg (Rabbits, IV)
- Except where otherwise noted, data are given for materials in their standard state (at 25 °C [77 °F], 100 kPa). Infobox references

EA-2012 is an extremely toxic organophosphate nerve agent. It is an extremely potent acetylcholinesterase inhibitor that is resistant to atropine and oxime treatment.

== See also ==
- Nerve agent
- EA-2054
- EA-2098
- EA-2613
