= EA-2613 =

Identifiers
3D model (JSmol)	Interactive image
- InChI: InChI=1S/C28H47N2O5P.2HI/c1-22(28(2,3)4)34-36(11,31)35-27-20-24(30(8,9)10)19-26(21-27)33-17-13-16-32-25-15-12-14-23(18-25)29(5,6)7;;/h12,14-15,18-22H,13,16-17H2,1-11H3;2*1H/q+2;;/p-2 Key: PLSZUOADUSAOET-UHFFFAOYSA-L
- SMILES: [I-].[I-].CC(C)(C)C(C)OP(=O)(C)Oc1cc([N+](C)(C)C)cc(c1)OCCCOc2cccc(c2)[N+](C)(C)C

Properties
Chemical formula	C_{28}H_{47}I_{2}N_{2}O_{5}P
Molar mass	776.476 g·mol^{−1}
Appearance	Solid
Melting point	124–126 °C (255–259 °F; 397–399 K)
Solubility in water	Soluble
Solubility	Soluble in alcohol, acetone and chloroform

Hazards
- Occupational safety and health (OHS/OSH)
Main hazards	Extremely toxic
- Lethal dose or concentration (LD, LC)
LD_{50} (median dose)	100 μg/kg (Rats, IV); 12 μg/kg (Rabbits, IV)
- Except where otherwise noted, data are given for materials in their standard state (at 25 °C [77 °F], 100 kPa). Infobox references

EA-2613 is an extremely toxic organophosphate nerve agent. It is an extremely potent acetylcholinesterase inhibitor that is resistant to atropine and oxime treatment.

== See also ==
- Nerve agent
- EA-2012
- EA-2054
- EA-2098
