= EA-2098 =

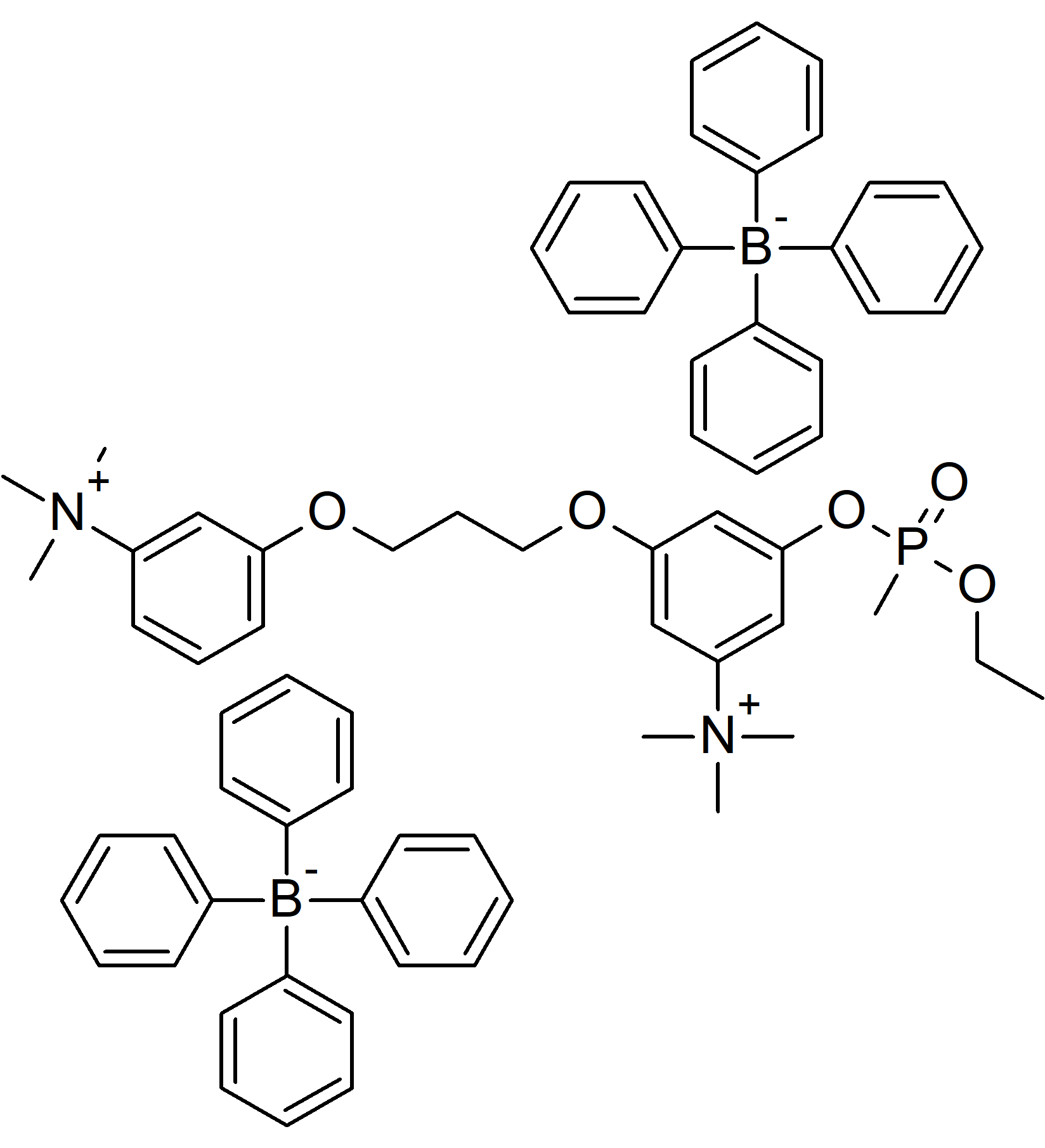

Names
- Preferred IUPAC name N,N,N-Trimethyl-3-{[ethoxy(methylphosphonoyl)]oxy}-5-{3-[3-(trimethylazaniumyl)phenoxy]propoxy}anilinium bis(tetraphenylboranuide)

Identifiers
3D model (JSmol)	Interactive image
- InChI: InChI=1S/2C24H20B.C24H39N2O5P/c2*1-5-13-21(14-6-1)25(22-15-7-2-8-16-22,23-17-9-3-10-18-23)24-19-11-4-12-20-24;1-9-30-32(8,27)31-24-18-21(26(5,6)7)17-23(19-24)29-15-11-14-28-22-13-10-12-20(16-22)25(2,3)4/h2*1-20H;10,12-13,16-19H,9,11,14-15H2,1-8H3/q2*-1;+2 Key: YXQOCWJQISOFRQ-UHFFFAOYSA-N
- SMILES: [B-](c1ccccc1)(c2ccccc2)(c3ccccc3)c4ccccc4.[B-](c1ccccc1)(c2ccccc2)(c3ccccc3)c4ccccc4.CCOP(=O)(C)Oc5cc([N+](C)(C)C)cc(c5)OCCCOc6cccc(c6)[N+](C)(C)C

Properties
Chemical formula	C_{72}H_{79}B_{2}N_{2}O_{5}P
Molar mass	1105.03 g·mol^{−1}
Appearance	Solid
Melting point	108–111 °C (226–232 °F; 381–384 K)
Solubility in water	Insoluble
Solubility	Soluble in acetone

Hazards
- Occupational safety and health (OHS/OSH)
Main hazards	Extremely toxic
- Lethal dose or concentration (LD, LC)
LD_{50} (median dose)	20 μg/kg (Rats, IV); 6.7 μg/kg (Rabbits, IV)
- Except where otherwise noted, data are given for materials in their standard state (at 25 °C [77 °F], 100 kPa). Infobox references

EA-2098 is an extremely toxic organophosphate nerve agent. It is an extremely potent acetylcholinesterase inhibitor that is resistant to atropine and oxime treatment.

EA-2098 was developed as part of a series of "V-series" nerve agents researched for military applications.

== See also ==
- Nerve agent
- EA-2012
- EA-2054
- EA-2613
