= Ungiminorine =

Names
- IUPAC name (1S,16R,17R,18S,19S)-17-methoxy-5,7-dioxa-12-azapentacyclo[10.6.1.0^{2,10}.0^{4,8}.0^{15,19}]nonadeca-2,4(8),9,14-tetraene-16,18-diol

Identifiers
CAS Number	27857-09-6
3D model (JSmol)	Interactive image
ChEMBL	ChEMBL497276
ChemSpider	8601376
PubChem CID	10425948
CompTox Dashboard (EPA)	DTXSID401045584
- InChI: InChI=1S/C17H19NO5/c1-21-17-15(19)9-2-3-18-6-8-4-11-12(23-7-22-11)5-10(8)13(14(9)18)16(17)20/h2,4-5,13-17,19-20H,3,6-7H2,1H3/t13-,14+,15+,16-,17-/m0/s1 Key: ZQLQBAUVRGDBJL-BIVLZKPYSA-N; InChI=1/C17H19NO5/c1-21-17-15(19)9-2-3-18-6-8-4-11-12(23-7-22-11)5-10(8)13(14(9)18)16(17)20/h2,4-5,13-17,19-20H,3,6-7H2,1H3/t13-,14+,15+,16-,17-/m0/s1 Key: ZQLQBAUVRGDBJL-BIVLZKPYBI
- SMILES: CO[C@@H]1[C@H]([C@@H]2[C@H]3C(=CCN3CC4=CC5=C(C=C24)OCO5)[C@H]1O)O
- Except where otherwise noted, data are given for materials in their standard state (at 25 °C [77 °F], 100 kPa). Infobox references

Ungiminorine is an acetylcholinesterase inhibitor isolated from Narcissus.
