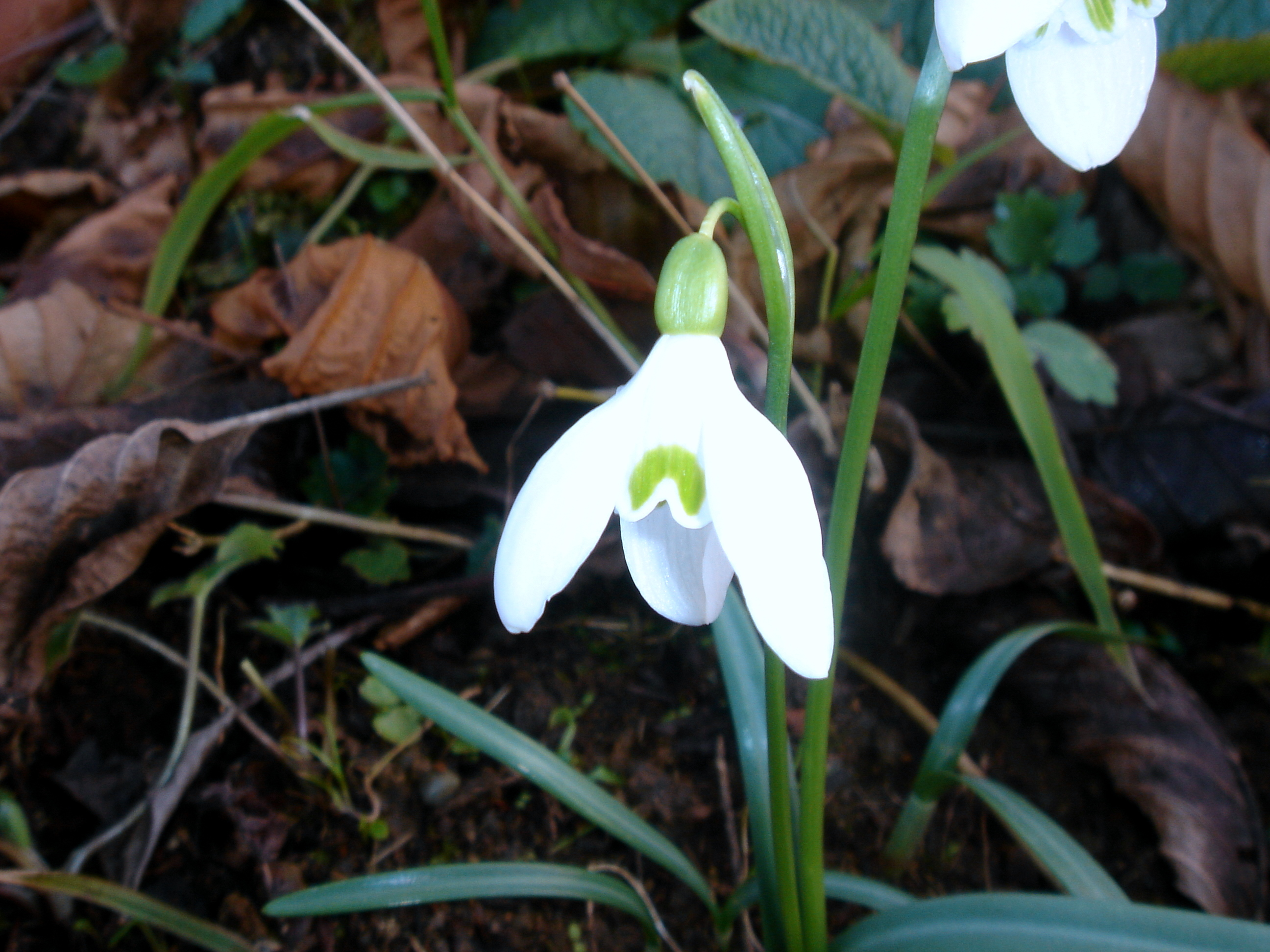

Scientific classification
- Kingdom: Plantae
- Clade: Tracheophytes
- Clade: Angiosperms
- Clade: Monocots
- Order: Asparagales
- Family: Amaryllidaceae
- Subfamily: Amaryllidoideae
- Genus: Galanthus
- Species: G. alpinus Sosn.
- Variety: G. a. var. alpinus

Trinomial name
- Galanthus alpinus var. alpinus

Synonyms
- Galanthus caucasicus (Baker) Grossh.; Galanthus nivalis subsp. caucasicus Baker; Galanthus redoutei Rupr.; Galanthus schaoricus Kem.-Nath.

= Galanthus alpinus var. alpinus =

Species of flowering plant

Galanthus alpinus var. alpinus, also known as the Caucasian snowdrop, is a variety of flowering plant within the subfamily Amaryllidoideae.

== Description ==
Galanthus alpinus var. alpinus is a perennial, bulb plant. Bulbs range from 2.5 – 4 cm long and 1.5 – 2 cm in diameter. The plants leaves are linear and green. Leaf length ranges from 4 – 8 cm before flowering and increase to 10 – 18 cm long after flowering. Flowers are 1.7 - 2.5 cm long and 0.8 - 1.5 cm wide. Outer petals are white however the plant possess a green spot on the inner petal segments.

== Distribution ==
=== Natural range ===
Galanthus alpinus var. alpinus is native to much of Europe, where it can be found in the following locations: Albania, Austria, Belarus, Bosnia and Herzegovina, Bulgaria, Crimea, Czech Republic, East Aegean Islands, France, Germany, Greece, Hungary, Italy, North Caucasus, Poland, Romania, Sicily, Slovakia, Spain, Switzerland, South Caucasus, European Turkey, Ukraine, Kosovo, Macedonia, Montenegro, Serbia and Slovenia. It is also native to parts of Asia such as: Iran, Lebanon, Syria, Palestine and Turkey.

=== Introduced range ===
Galanthus alpinus var. alpinus has also been introduced to many parts of the world outside of its native range.

It has spread further into Europe through introductions into Belgium, the Netherlands, Norway, Sweden and the United Kingdom.

It has also been introduced to the continent of North America where it can be found in the states of: Maryland, Massachusetts, Michigan, New Jersey, New York, North Carolina, Ohio, Pennsylvania, Utah, Virginia and Washington.

Galanthus alpinus var. alpinus has also been introduced into the Canadian provinces of New Brunswick, Newfoundland and Ontario.

== Habitat ==
Galanthus alpinus var. alpinus is known to inhabit woodland, grassland and mountainous habitats.

It can also be found in manmade habitats such as churchyards, gardens and roadsides.

== Uses ==
Galanthus alpinus var. alpinus can be used as an unusual ornamental plant in garden borders and lawns.

This variety contains the alkaloid galantamine. When isolated the alkaloid can be used to successfully treat mild or moderate Alzheimer's disease. Galantamine has also been used to treat injuries to the nervous system and to induce abortion in the early stages of pregnancy.
