= Huprine X =

Chemical compound

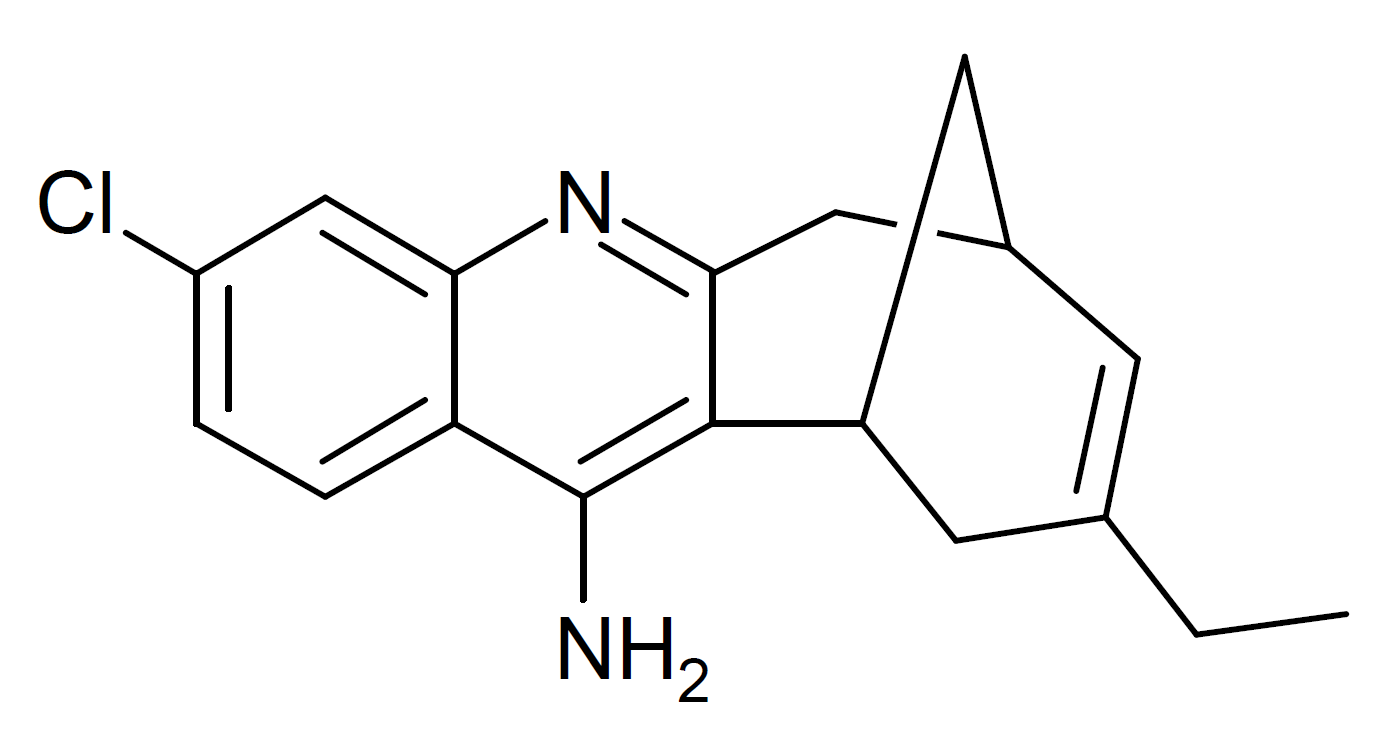

Identifiers
- IUPAC name: (1S)-7-chloro-15-ethyl-10-azatetracyclo[11.3.1.0^{2,11}.0^{4,9}]heptadeca-2,4(9),5,7,10,14-hexaen-3-amine
- CAS Number: 263172-34-5
- PubChem CID: 3632
- DrugBank: DB04114
- ChemSpider: 3506
- ChEMBL: ChEMBL143812

Chemical and physical data
- Formula: C_{18}H_{19}ClN_{2}
- Molar mass: 298.81 g·mol^{−1}
- 3D model (JSmol): Interactive image
- SMILES: CCC1=CC2CC(C1)C3=C(C4=C(C=C(C=C4)Cl)N=C3C2)N
- InChI: InChI=1S/C18H19ClN2/c1-2-10-5-11-7-12(6-10)17-16(8-11)21-15-9-13(19)3-4-14(15)18(17)20/h3-5,9,11-12H,2,6-8H2,1H3,(H2,20,21); Key:QTPHSDHUHXUYFE-UHFFFAOYSA-N

Huprine X is a synthetic cholinergic compound developed as a hybrid between the natural product Huperzine A and the synthetic drug tacrine. It is one of the most potent reversible inhibitors of acetylcholinesterase known, with a binding affinity of 0.026nM, as well as showing direct agonist activity at both nicotinic and muscarinic acetylcholine receptors. In animal studies it has nootropic and neuroprotective effects, and is used in research into Alzheimer's disease, and although huprine X itself has not been researched for medical use in humans, a large family of related derivatives have been developed.
