= Carbosulfan =

Names
- IUPAC name 2,2-Dimethyl-2,3-dihydro-1-benzofuran-7-yl [(dibutylamino)sulfanyl]methylcarbamate
- Other names 2,3-Dihydro-2,2-dimethyl-7-benzofuranyl[(dibutylamino)thio] methylcarbamate

Identifiers
| CAS Number | 55285-14-8 |
| 3D model (JSmol) | Interactive image |
| ChEBI | CHEBI:38476 |
| ChemSpider | 37764 |
| ECHA InfoCard | 100.054.132 |
| PubChem CID | 41384 |
| UNII | V1DGN4AK6G |
| CompTox Dashboard (EPA) | DTXSID5023950 |
- InChI: InChI=1S/C20H32N2O3S/c1-6-8-13-22(14-9-7-2)26-21(5)19(23)24-17-12-10-11-16-15-20(3,4)25-18(16)17/h10-12H,6-9,13-15H2,1-5H3 Key: JLQUFIHWVLZVTJ-UHFFFAOYSA-N; InChI=1/C20H32N2O3S/c1-6-8-13-22(14-9-7-2)26-21(5)19(23)24-17-12-10-11-16-15-20(3,4)25-18(16)17/h10-12H,6-9,13-15H2,1-5H3 Key: JLQUFIHWVLZVTJ-UHFFFAOYAN
- SMILES: O=C(Oc2cccc1c2OC(C1)(C)C)N(SN(CCCC)CCCC)C

Properties
| Chemical formula | C_{20}H_{32}N_{2}O_{3}S |
| Molar mass | 380.55 g·mol^{−1} |
- Except where otherwise noted, data are given for materials in their standard state (at 25 °C [77 °F], 100 kPa). verify (what is ?) Infobox references

Carbosulfan is an organic compound adherent to the carbamate class. At normal conditions, it is brown viscous liquid. It is not very stable; it decomposes slowly at room temperature. Its solubility in water is low but it is miscible with xylene, hexane, chloroform, dichloromethane, methanol and acetone. Carbosulfan is used as an insecticide. The European Union banned use of carbosulfan in 2007.

Its oral LD_{50} for rats is 90 to 250 mg/kg bw, inhalation LC_{50} is 0.61 mg/L. Carbosulfan is only slightly absorbed through skin (LD_{50} >2000 mg/kg for rabbits). The mechanism of toxicity is based on reversible inhibition of acetylcholinesterase (as for carbamates generally). Carbosulfan has very low maximum residue limits for use in the EU and UK examples of this can be seen in apples and oranges, where it is 0.05 mg/kg.

== See also ==
- Carbofuran
