= BW284C51 =

Names
- Preferred IUPAC name 4,4′-(3-Oxopentane-1,5-diyl)bis[N,N-dimethyl-N-(prop-2-en-1-yl)anilinium] dibromide

Identifiers
CAS Number	402-40-4
3D model (JSmol)	Interactive image
ChEMBL	ChEMBL464538
ChemSpider	9437
ECHA InfoCard	100.129.545
PubChem CID	9820
CompTox Dashboard (EPA)	DTXSID90960624
- InChI: InChI=1S/C27H38N2O.2BrH/c1-7-21-28(3,4)25-15-9-23(10-16-25)13-19-27(30)20-14-24-11-17-26(18-12-24)29(5,6)22-8-2;;/h7-12,15-18H,1-2,13-14,19-22H2,3-6H3;2*1H/q+2;;/p-2 Key: WKDURMTZOWGWTD-UHFFFAOYSA-L
- SMILES: C[N+](C)(CC=C)c1ccc(cc1)CCC(=O)CCc2ccc(cc2)[N+](C)(C)CC=C.[Br-].[Br-]

Properties
Chemical formula	C_{27}H_{38}Br_{2}N_{2}O
Molar mass	566.422 g·mol^{−1}

Hazards
- Occupational safety and health (OHS/OSH)
Main hazards	Toxic
- GHS labelling
Pictograms	(GHS06: Toxic)
Signal word	Danger
Hazard statements	H300, H310, H330
Precautionary statements	P260, P262, P264, P270, P271, P280, P284, P301+P310, P302+P350, P304+P340, P310, P320, P321, P330, P361, P363, P403+P233, P405, P501
- Except where otherwise noted, data are given for materials in their standard state (at 25 °C [77 °F], 100 kPa). Infobox references

BW284C51 is a selective acetylcholinesterase inhibitor. It is also a nicotinic antagonist.

== See also ==
- Cholinesterase inhibitor
- Nicotinic antagonist
