= Echothiophate =

Pharmaceutical drug

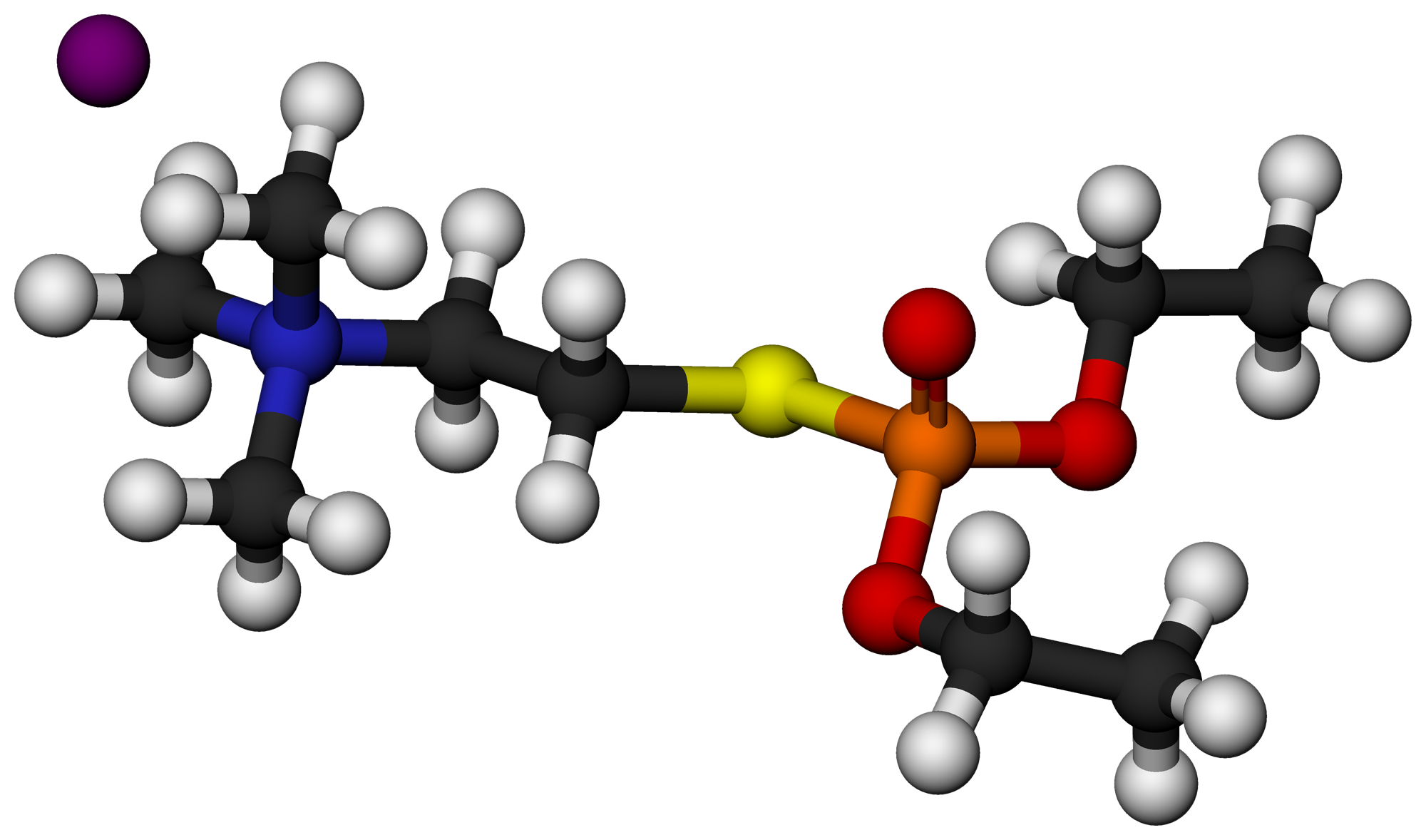

Clinical data
- Trade names: Phospholine
- Routes of administration: Topical (eye drops)
- ATC code: S01EB03 (WHO)

Identifiers
- IUPAC name: 2-(Diethoxyphosphorylsulfanyl)ethyl-N,N,N-trimethylazanium iodide
- CAS Number: 6736-03-4
- PubChem CID: 10547
- DrugBank: DB01057
- ChemSpider: 10107
- UNII: 0F350BVT6S
- KEGG: D02193
- ChEBI: CHEBI:59849
- ChEMBL: ChEMBL1201341

Chemical and physical data
- Formula: C_{9}H_{23}INO_{3}PS
- Molar mass: 383.23 g·mol^{−1}
- 3D model (JSmol): Interactive image
- SMILES: [I-].O=P(OCC)(OCC)SCC[N+](C)(C)C
- InChI: InChI=1S/C9H23NO3PS.HI/c1-6-12-14(11,13-7-2)15-9-8-10(3,4)5;/h6-9H2,1-5H3;1H/q+1;/p-1; Key:OVXQHPWHMXOFRD-UHFFFAOYSA-M

Echothiophate (Phospholine) is an irreversible acetylcholinesterase inhibitor.

== Uses ==
It is used as an ocular antihypertensive in the treatment of open angle glaucoma and, in some cases, accommodative esotropia. It is available under several trade names such as Phospholine Iodide (Wyeth-Ayerst).

Echothiophate binds irreversibly to cholinesterase. Because of the very slow rate at which echothiophate is hydrolyzed by cholinesterase, its effects can last a week or more. Adverse effects include muscle spasm and other systemic effects.

== Mechanism of action ==
It covalently binds by its phosphate group to serine group at the active site of the cholinesterase. Once bound, the enzyme is permanently inactive and the cell has to make new enzymes.

== Shortage ==
Wyeth Pharmaceuticals stopped manufacturing echothiophate iodide in the US in 2003. After contacting the American Academy of Ophthalmology (AAO), Wyeth rescinded their decision and, according to AAO public relations representative Michelle Stephens, the AAO and Wyeth were in talks for about a year about manufacturing it.

In the meantime, a worldwide shortage of the drug has occurred.

== Chemistry ==
Echothiophate is made by reacting diethylchlorophosphoric acid with 2-dimethylaminoethylmercaptan, giving S-(2-dimethylaminoethyl)-O,O-diethylthiophosphate, which is alkylated by methyl iodide, forming echothiophate.

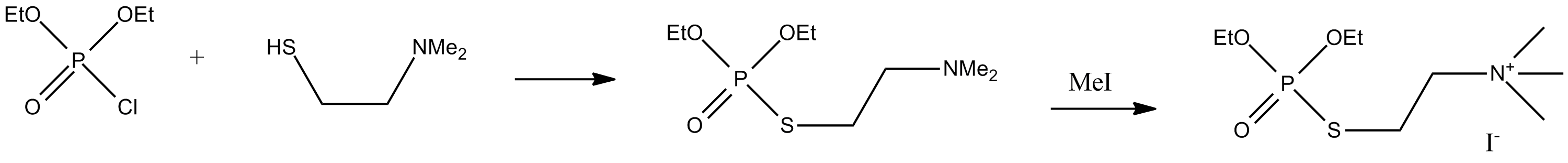
