= Quasi-irreversible inhibitor =

The term quasi-irreversible inhibitor (QI) is a vague term used to describe enzyme inhibitors that are considered neither strictly reversible or irreversible.

== Cholinesterase inhibitors ==
In the context of cholinesterase inhibitors, QIs are compounds that rapidly phosphorylate cholinesterase. From the perspective of more general enzyme inhibitor classification, these inhibitors are simply irreversible inhibitors as they form a covalent linkage. The quasi-irreversible inhibitors are generally used as insecticides and nerve agents.

When the reaction only occurs to the degree of phosphorylation, an oxime-type cholinesterase reactivator can often rescue this enzyme by removing the phosphate group. When a subsequent internal dealkylation ("aging") reaction occurs, however, the oxime becomes ineffective due to the resultant oxyanion repulsing the oxime compound. Reactivation of aged cholinesterase remains an active area of research.

Despite this extra aging step adding to the difficulty of treatment, sources do not appear to consistently use quasi-irreversible vs. irreversible for whether the inhibitor is dealkylating (or otherwise oxime-repulsing) in addition to phosphorylating.

== CYP ==
In the context of cytochrome P450 enzymes, a quasi-irreversible inhibitor is a more powerful reversible inhibitor that resembles an irreversible inhibitor by making a strong non-covalent interaction.

== See also ==
- Reversible inhibitors
- Monoamine oxidase inhibitors
- Enzyme inhibitor
