= Benzgalantamine =

Medication

Clinical data
- Trade names: Zunveyl
- Other names: ALPHA-1062
- AHFS/Drugs.com: Monograph
- MedlinePlus: a624044
- License data: US DailyMed: Benzgalantamine
- Routes of administration: By mouth
- Drug class: Cholinesterase inhibitor
- ATC code: N06DA06 (WHO)

Legal status
- Legal status: US: ℞-only

Identifiers
- CAS Number: 224169-27-1; 1542321-58-3
- PubChem CID: 44240142
- DrugBank: DB19353
- ChemSpider: 60600739
- UNII: XOI2Q0ZF7G; LN7PMJ4P57
- KEGG: D12930; D12931
- ChEMBL: ChEMBL5095056

Chemical and physical data
- Formula: C_{24}H_{25}NO_{4}
- Molar mass: 391.467 g·mol^{−1}
- 3D model (JSmol): Interactive image
- SMILES: COc1ccc2c3c1O[C@H]1C[C@@H](OC(=O)c4ccccc4)C=C[C@@]31CCN(C)C2
- InChI: InChI=1S/C24H25NO4/c1-25-13-12-24-11-10-18(28-23(26)16-6-4-3-5-7-16)14-20(24)29-22-19(27-2)9-8-17(15-25)21(22)24/h3-11,18,20H,12-15H2,1-2H3/t18-,20-,24-/m0/s1; Key:JKVNJTYHRABHIY-WXVUKLJWSA-N

Benzgalantamine, sold under the brand name Zunveyl, is a medication used for the treatment of mild to moderate dementia of the Alzheimer's type. It is a cholinesterase inhibitor. Benzgalantamine is a prodrug of galantamine.

The most common side effects include nausea, vomiting, diarrhea, dizziness, headache, and decreased appetite.

Benzgalantamine was approved for medical use in the United States in July 2024.

== Medical uses ==
Benzgalantamine is indicated for the treatment of mild to moderate dementia of the Alzheimer's type in adults.

== Side effects ==
The most common side effects include nausea, vomiting, diarrhea, dizziness, headache, and decreased appetite.

== Society and culture ==
=== Legal status ===
Benzgalantamine was approved for medical use in the United States in July 2024.

=== Names ===
Benzgalantamine is the international nonproprietary name.
