= Huperzine A =

Chemical compound

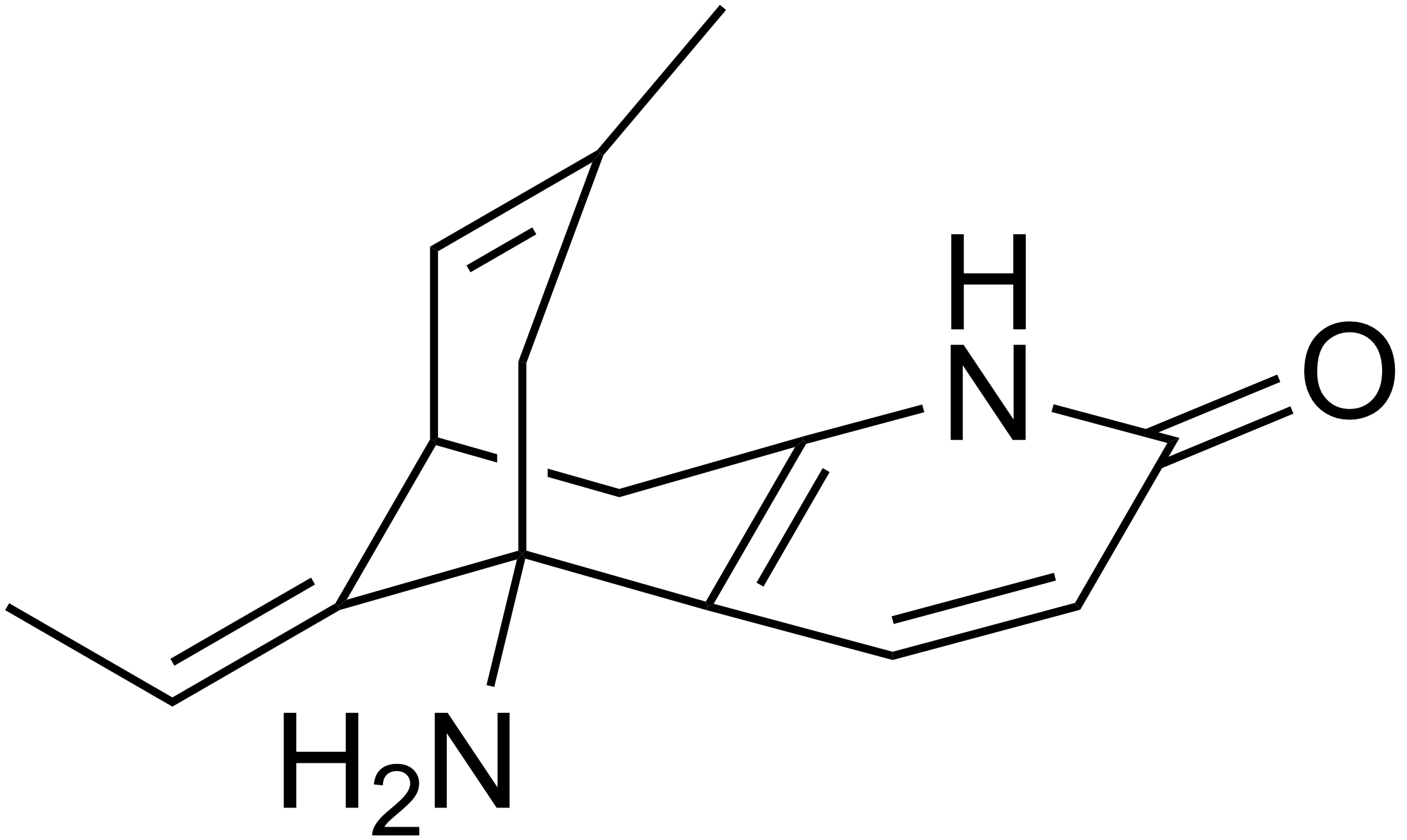

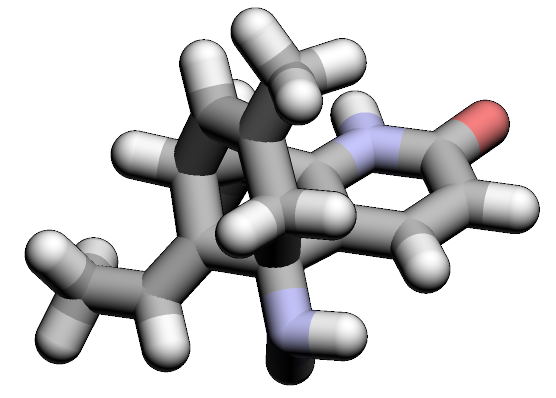

Clinical data
- Other names: HupA
- Routes of administration: By mouth
- Drug class: Acetylcholinesterase inhibitor
- ATC code: N06

Pharmacokinetic data
- Elimination half-life: 10–14 hours

Identifiers
- IUPAC name: (1R,9R,13E)-1-Amino-13-ethylidene-11-methyl-6-azatricyclo[7.3.1.0^{2,7}]trideca-2(7),3,10-trien-5-one
- CAS Number: 102518-79-6
- PubChem CID: 854026
- DrugBank: DB01928
- ChemSpider: 16736021
- UNII: 0111871I23
- ChEBI: CHEBI:78330
- ChEMBL: ChEMBL395280
- CompTox Dashboard (EPA): DTXSID8046038
- ECHA InfoCard: 100.132.430

Chemical and physical data
- Formula: C_{15}H_{18}N_{2}O
- Molar mass: 242.322 g·mol^{−1}
- 3D model (JSmol): Interactive image
- Melting point: 217 to 219 °C (423 to 426 °F)
- SMILES: C/C=C/1\[C@@H]2CC3=C([C@]1(CC(=C2)C)N)C=CC(=O)N3
- InChI: InChI=1S/C15H18N2O/c1-3-11-10-6-9(2)8-15(11,16)12-4-5-14(18)17-13(12)7-10/h3-6,10H,7-8,16H2,1-2H3,(H,17,18)/b11-3+/t10-,15+/m0/s1; Key:ZRJBHWIHUMBLCN-YQEJDHNASA-N

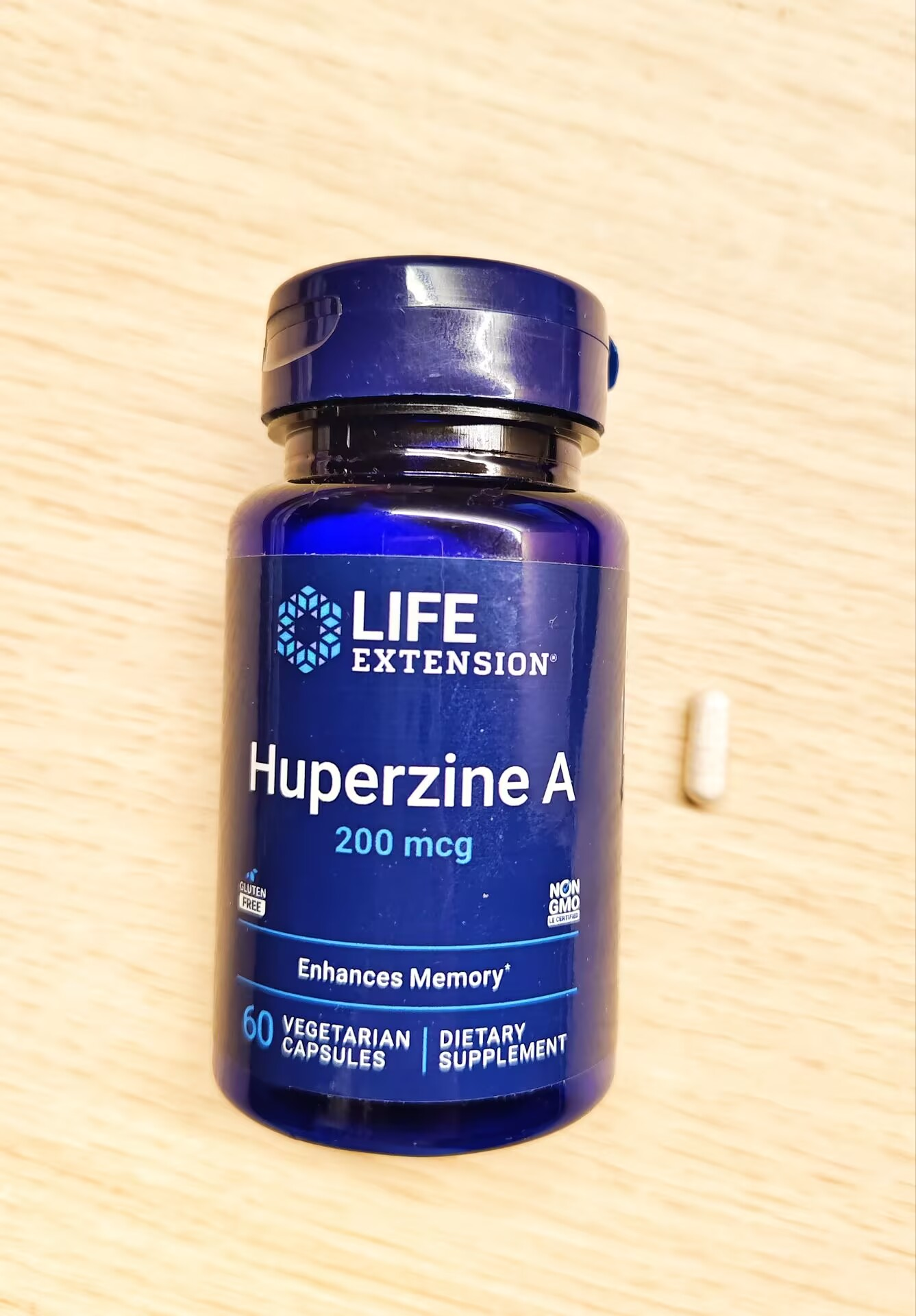
Huperzine A capsules sold by the supplement company Life Extension, 200 μg per capsule

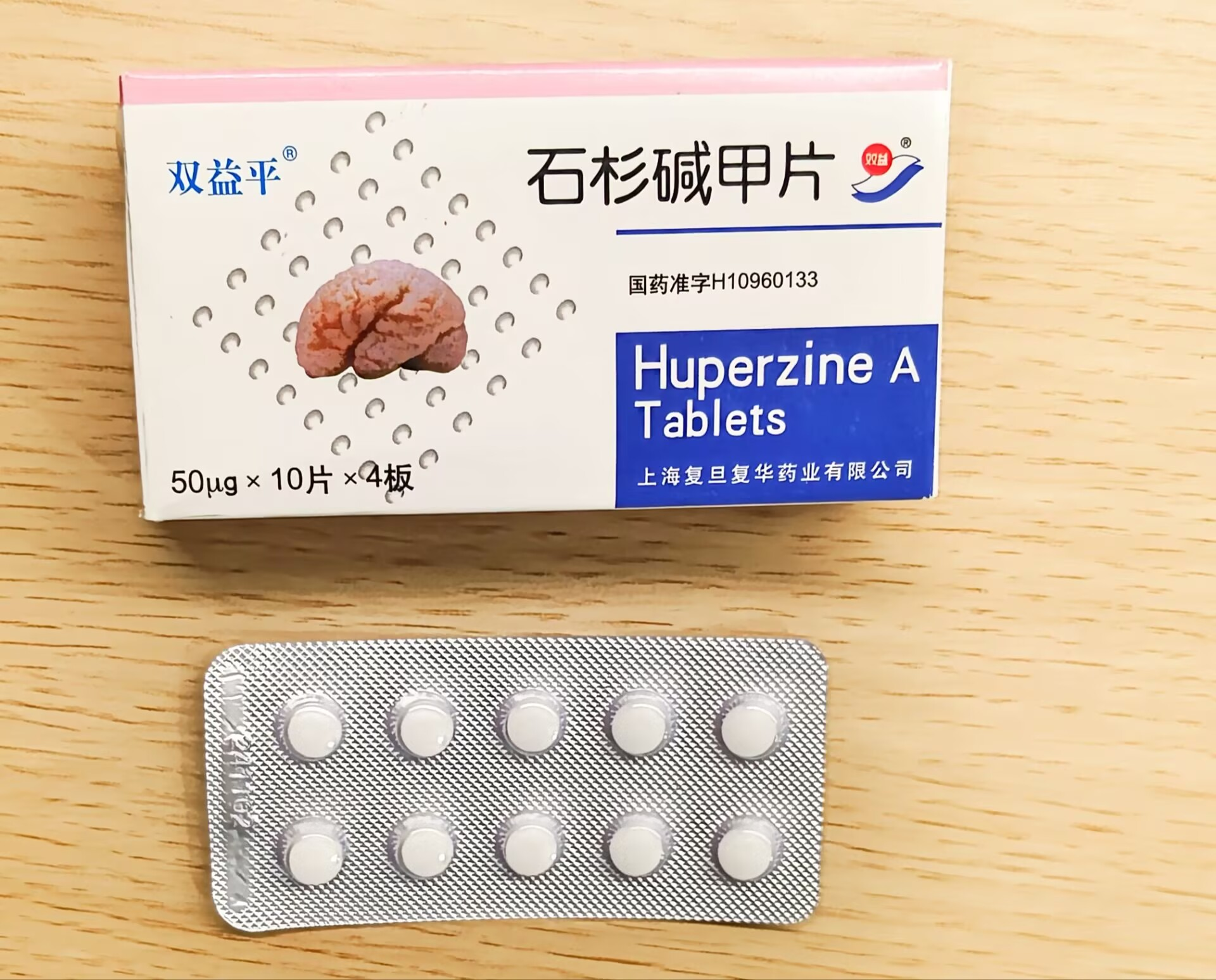
Huperzine A pills in China, 50 μg per tablet

Huperzine A, a Lycopodium alkaloid, was first isolated in 1983 from Huperzia serrata, a plant used in Chinese folk medicine. Huperzine A also exists in other Huperzia species, including H. elmeri, H. carinat, and H. aqualupian with varying quantities.

Huperzine A has been investigated as a treatment for neurological conditions such as Alzheimer's disease, but a 2013 meta-analysis of those studies concluded that they were of poor methodological quality and the findings should be interpreted with caution.

Huperzine A inhibits acetylcholinesterase, the enzyme responsible for breaking down the neurotransmitter acetylcholine (ACh), and is also a weak NMDA receptor antagonist with poor affinity. It crosses the blood–brain barrier and is widely available as an over the counter nutritional supplement, marketed as a memory and concentration enhancer.

== Adverse effects ==
Huperzine A may present with mild cholinergic side effects such as nausea, vomiting, and diarrhea. Slight muscle twitching and slurred speech might also occur, as well as hypersalivation and sweating. The use of huperzine A during pregnancy and lactation is not recommended due to the lack of sufficient safety data.

== Pharmacology ==
Huperzine A is a potent, highly specific, reversible acetylcholinesterase inhibitor, with IC_{50} binding affinity of ~82 nM. It is also a weak NMDA receptor antagonist, with IC_{50} of ~65,000–82,000 nM (65–82 μM); due to this relatively low affinity, huperzine A is unlikely to produce significant NMDA receptor blockade at clinically relevant concentrations in humans. Huperzine A readily crosses the blood–brain barrier and demonstrates central nervous system activity at therapeutic doses as low as 100 μg in humans.

Acetylcholinesterase is an enzyme that catalyzes the breakdown of choline-based neurotransmitters, particularly acetylcholine (ACh), which plays a critical role in memory, learning, and behavior. The structure of the complex of huperzine A with acetylcholinesterase has been determined by X-ray crystallography (PDB code: 1VOT; see the 3D structure).

== Drug interactions ==
Huperzine A may have additive effects if taken with drugs causing bradycardia, such as beta blockers, which may decrease heart rate. Theoretically, there may be possible additive cholinergic effects if huperzine A is taken with other acetylcholinesterase inhibitors or cholinergic agents.

== Safety ==
Huperzine A, in spite of the possible cholinergic side effects, seems to have a wide margin of safety. Toxicology studies show huperzine A to be non-toxic even when administered at 50–100 times the human therapeutic dose. The extract is active for six hours at a dose of 2 μg/kg with no remarkable side effects.

== Synthesis ==
Two scalable and efficient total syntheses of huperzine A have been reported.

== History ==
In 1989, a research study found that the chemical structure of the alkaloid selagine reported in 1960 from a study of Lycopodium slago L. (analyzed using 60-MHz NMR) was identical to that of Huperzine A.

== Research ==
=== Effects ===
Huperzine A has been investigated as a possible treatment for diseases characterized by neurodegeneration such as Alzheimer's disease, and there is some evidence from small-scale studies that it can benefit cognitive functioning, global clinical status, and ability to engage in activities of daily living (ADLs) among individuals with the disease. In a 2016 systematic review of systematic reviews, huperzine A was associated with a standardized mean difference of 1.48 (95% CI, 0.95–2.02) compared to placebo on measures of ADL among people with dementia, but the evidence was very low-quality and uncertain. In a 2022 umbrella review, huperzine A was associated with broad benefits to dementia patients' cognitive functioning, but the degree of heterogeneity in measurements and outcomes of the reviewed studies indicated publication bias toward huperzine A benefit.

=== Use in organophosphate poisoning ===
Huperzine A might be useful in the treatment of organophosphate nerve agent poisoning by preventing damage to the central nervous system caused by such agents.

=== Use as oneirogen ===
Likely due to its action as an acetylcholinesterase inhibitor, huperzine A has shown lucid dreaming promoting properties and has been used as oneirogen.
