= Galantamine =

Chemical compound

- Molecular structure of galantamine

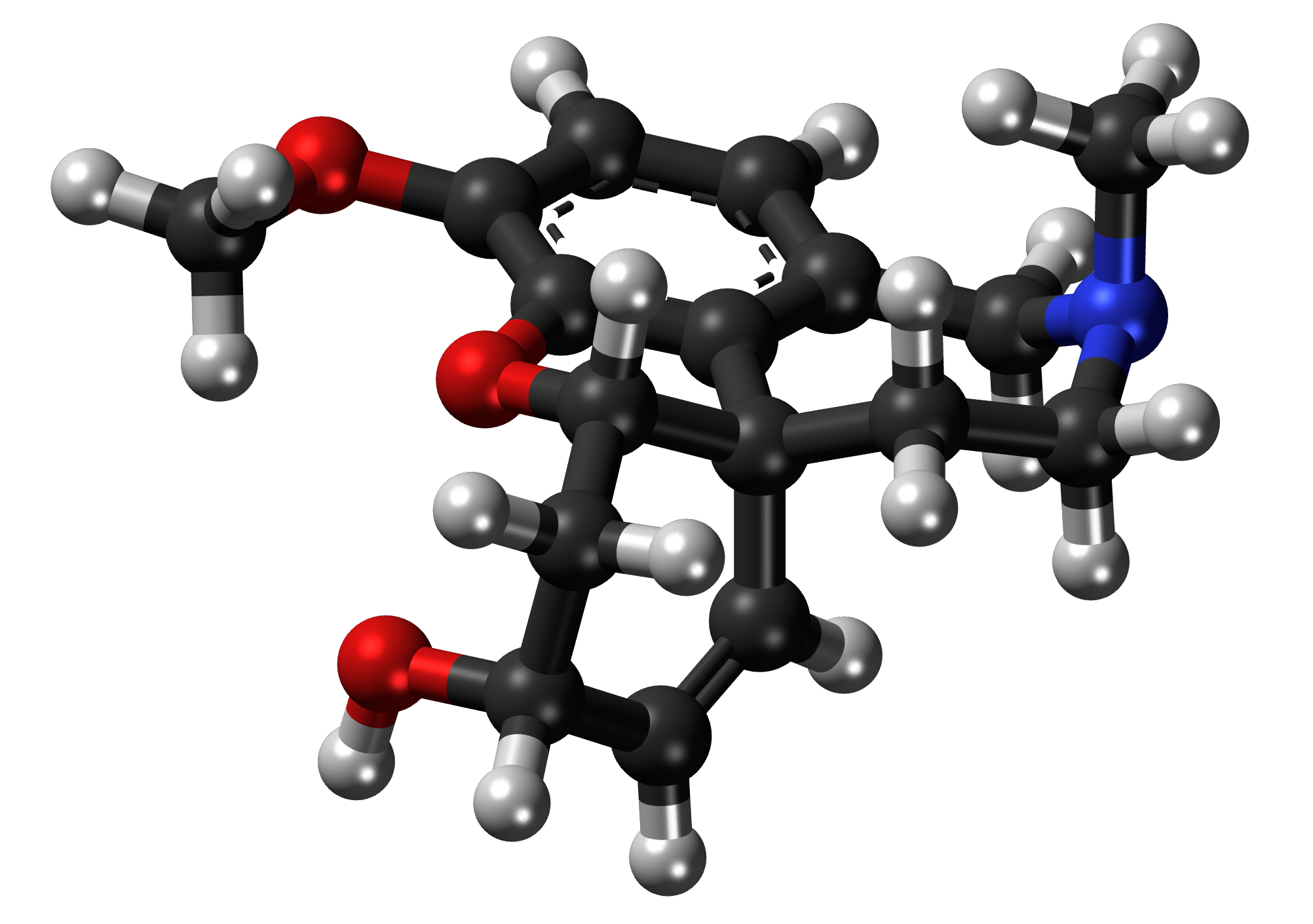
- 3D representation of a galantamine molecule

Clinical data
- Trade names: Razadyne, others
- AHFS/Drugs.com: Monograph
- MedlinePlus: a699058
- License data: US DailyMed: Razadyne
- Pregnancy category: AU: B1
- Routes of administration: By mouth
- Drug class: Acetylcholinesterase inhibitor
- ATC code: N06DA04 (WHO)

Legal status
- Legal status: BR: Class C1 (Other controlled substances); US: ℞-only; EU: Rx-only; In general: ℞ (Prescription only)

Pharmacokinetic data
- Bioavailability: 80–100%
- Protein binding: 18%
- Metabolism: Liver partially CYP450:CYP2D6/3A4 substrate
- Elimination half-life: 7 hours
- Excretion: Kidney (95%, of which 32% unchanged), fecal (5%)

Identifiers
- IUPAC name: (4aS,6R,8aS)-5,6,9,10,11,12-Hexahydro-3-methoxy-11-methyl-4aH-[1]benzofuro[3a,3,2-ef][2]benzazepin-6-ol
- CAS Number: 357-70-0
- PubChem CID: 9651
- IUPHAR/BPS: 6693
- DrugBank: DB00674
- ChemSpider: 9272
- UNII: 0D3Q044KCA
- KEGG: D04292
- ChEBI: CHEBI:42944
- ChEMBL: ChEMBL659
- PDB ligand: GNT (PDBe, RCSB PDB)
- CompTox Dashboard (EPA): DTXSID2045606
- ECHA InfoCard: 100.118.289

Chemical and physical data
- Formula: C_{17}H_{21}NO_{3}
- Molar mass: 287.359 g·mol^{−1}
- 3D model (JSmol): Interactive image
- Melting point: 126.5 °C (259.7 °F)
- SMILES: O(c2c1O[C@H]4C[C@@H](O)/C=C\[C@@]43c1c(cc2)CN(C)CC3)C
- InChI: InChI=1S/C17H21NO3/c1-18-8-7-17-6-5-12(19)9-14(17)21-16-13(20-2)4-3-11(10-18)15(16)17/h3-6,12,14,19H,7-10H2,1-2H3/t12-,14-,17-/m0/s1; Key:ASUTZQLVASHGKV-JDFRZJQESA-N

Galantamine is a type of acetylcholinesterase inhibitor. It is an alkaloid extracted from the bulbs and flowers of Galanthus nivalis (common snowdrop), Galanthus caucasicus (Caucasian snowdrop), Galanthus woronowii (Voronov's snowdrop), and other members of the family Amaryllidaceae, such as Narcissus (daffodil), Leucojum aestivum (snowflake), and Lycoris including Lycoris radiata (red spider lily). It can also be produced synthetically.

Galantamine is used clinically for treating early-stage Alzheimer's disease and memory impairments, although it has had limited success with the more advanced condition of dementia.

While the exact mechanism of galantamine in treating Alzheimer's disease is unknown, it is hypothesized to exert its therapeutic effects by enhancing cholinergic function. Galantamine inhibits the activity of acetylcholinesterase, an enzyme that catalyzes the breakdown of the neurotransmitter acetylcholine. This action elevates and prolongs synaptic acetylcholine concentrations, increasing the availability of acetylcholine to its receptors. The cholinergic system is involved in a variety of functions relevant to Alzheimer's symptomology, such as memory processing, reasoning, and thinking. Galantamine may cause serious adverse effects, such as stomach bleeding, liver injury or chest pain.

Galantamine was isolated for the first time from bulbs of Galanthus nivalis (common snowdrop) in the Soviet Union in the 1940s. The active ingredient was extracted, identified, and studied, in particular in relation to acetylcholinesterase (AChE)-inhibiting properties. The first industrial process was developed in 1959. However, it was not until the 1990s when full-scale synthesis was upscaled and optimized.

== Medical uses ==
Galantamine, sold under the brand name Razadyne among others, is indicated for the treatment of mild to moderate vascular dementia and Alzheimer's disease. The first person to extract galantamine and theorize its usefulness in medicine, was the Bulgarian chemist Dimitar Paskov in 1959. In the United States, it is approved by the Food and Drug Administration (FDA) for the treatment of mild to moderate dementia. Galantamine may not be effective for treating mild cognitive impairment.

=== Alzheimer's disease ===
Alzheimer's disease is characterized by the impairment of cholinergic function. One hypothesis is that this impairment contributes to the cognitive deficits caused by the disease. This hypothesis forms the basis for use of galantamine as a cholinergic enhancer in the treatment of Alzheimer's. Galantamine inhibits acetylcholinesterase, an enzyme which hydrolyzes acetylcholine. As a result of acetylcholinesterase inhibition, galantamine increases the availability of acetylcholine for synaptic transmission. Additionally, galantamine binds to the allosteric sites of nicotinic receptors, which causes a conformational change. This allosteric modulation increases the nicotinic receptor's response to acetylcholine. The activation of presynaptic nicotinic receptors increases the release of acetylcholine, further increasing the availability of acetylcholine. Galantamine's competitive inhibition of acetylcholinesterase and allosteric nicotinic modulation serves as a dual mechanism of action.

To reduce the prevalence of negative side effects associated with galantamine, such as nausea and vomiting, a dose-escalation scheme may be used. The use of a dose-escalation scheme has been well accepted in countries where galantamine is used. A dose-escalation scheme for Alzheimer's treatment involves a recommended starting dosage of 4 mg galantamine tablets given twice a day (8 mg/day). After a minimum of 4 weeks, the dosage may then be increased to 8 mg given twice a day (16 mg/day). After a minimum of 4 weeks at 16 mg/day, the treatment may be increased to 12 mg given twice a day (24 mg/day). Dosage increases are based upon the assessment of clinical benefit as well as tolerability of the previous dosage. If treatment is interrupted for more than three days, the process is usually restarted, beginning at the starting dosage, and re-escalating to the current dose. It has been found that a dosage between 16–24 mg/day is the optimal dosage.

In December 2023, the FDA approved a New Drug Application (NDA) for a pro-drug of galantamine called ALPHA-1062. In July 2024, The FDA approved benzgalantamine (Zunveyl, a derivative of galantamine), previously known as ALPHA-1062, to treat mild-to-moderate Alzheimer's disease.

== Side effects ==
The adverse effect profile of galantamine includes potential for allergic reaction, including hives, swelling of the face or throat, and skin rash. Using galantamine may cause chest pain, bloody urine, stomach bleeding, and liver injury, among other side effects. Nausea, vomiting, diarrhea, dizziness, and headache are considered common side effects.

A gradual titration over more than three months may enable long-term tolerability in some people.

Galantamine has a wide spectrum of interactions with other medications and medical disorders, requiring close assessment between the physician and patient.

== Pharmacology ==
Galantamine's chemical structure contains a tertiary amine. At a neutral pH, this tertiary amine will often bond to a proton, and appear mostly as an ammonium ion.

Galantamine is a potent allosteric potentiating ligand of human nicotinic acetylcholine receptors (nAChRs) α_{4}β_{2}, α_{3}β_{4}, and α_{6}β_{4}, and chicken/mouse nAChRs α_{7}/5-HT_{3} in certain areas of the brain. By binding to the allosteric site of the nAChRs, a conformational change occurs which increases the receptors response to acetylcholine. This modulation of the nicotinic cholinergic receptors on cholinergic neurons in turn causes an increase in the amount of acetylcholine released. However, recent studies suggest that Galantamine does not functionally act at human nAChRs α_{4}β_{2} or α_{7} as a positive allosteric modulator.

Galantamine also works as a weak competitive and reversible cholinesterase inhibitor in all areas of the body. By inhibiting acetylcholinesterase, it increases the concentration and thereby action of acetylcholine in certain parts of the brain. Galantamine's effects on nAChRs and complementary acetylcholinesterase inhibition make up a dual mechanism of action. It is hypothesized that this action might relieve some of the symptoms of Alzheimer's.

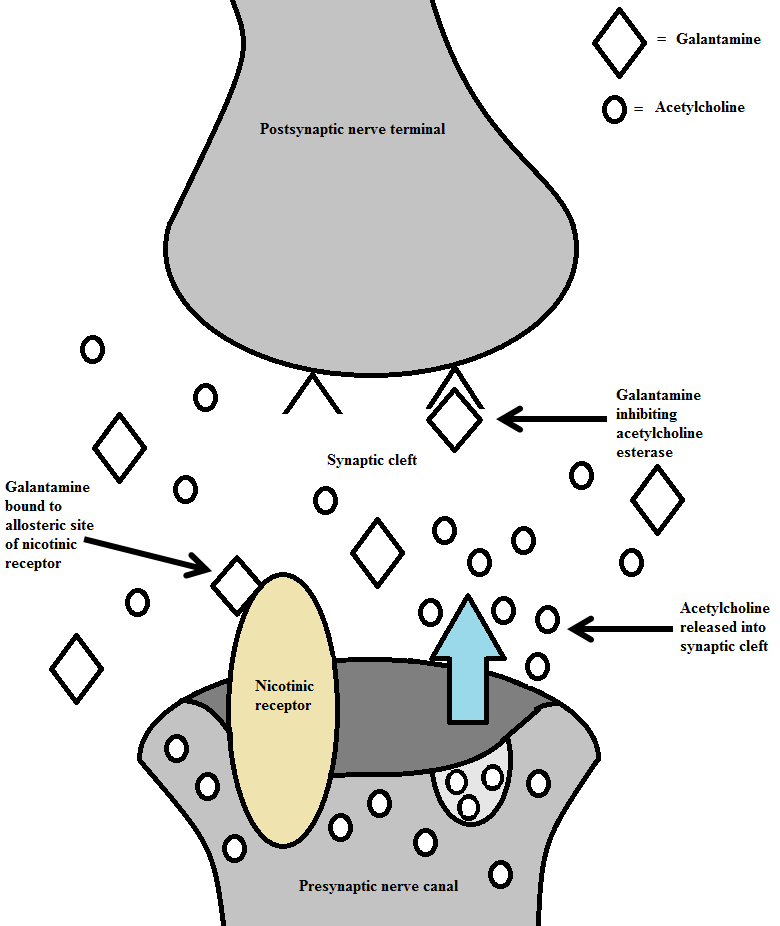
Galantamine's dual mechanism of action

Galantamine in its pure form is a white powder. The atomic resolution 3D structure of the complex of galantamine and its target, acetylcholinesterase, was determined by X-ray crystallography in 1999 (PDB code: 1DX6; see complex). There is no evidence that galantamine alters the course of the underlying dementing process.

=== Pharmacokinetics ===
Absorption of galantamine is rapid and complete and shows linear pharmacokinetics. It is well absorbed with absolute oral bioavailability between 80 and 100%. It has a terminal elimination half-life of seven hours. Peak effect of inhibiting acetylcholinesterase was achieved about one hour after a single oral dose of 8 mg in some healthy volunteers.

The coadministration of food delays the rate of galantamine absorption, but does not affect the extent of absorption.

Plasma protein binding of galantamine is about 18%, which is relatively low.

== Metabolism ==
Approximately 75% of a dose of galantamine is metabolised in the liver. In vitro studies have shown that hepatic CYP2D6 and CYP3A4 are involved in galantamine metabolism. Within 24 hours of intravenous or oral administration approximately 20% of a dose of galantamine will be excreted unreacted in the urine.

In humans, several metabolic pathways for galantamine exist. These pathways lead to the formation of a number of different metabolites. One of the metabolites that may result can be formed through the glucuronidation of galantamine. Additionally, galantamine may undergo oxidation or demethylation at its nitrogen atom, forming two other possible metabolites. Galantamine can undergo demethylation at its oxygen atom, forming an intermediate which can then undergo glucuronidation or sulfate conjugation. Lastly, galantamine may be oxidized and then reduced before finally undergoing demethylation or oxidation at its nitrogen atom, or demethylation and subsequent glucuronidation at its oxygen atom.

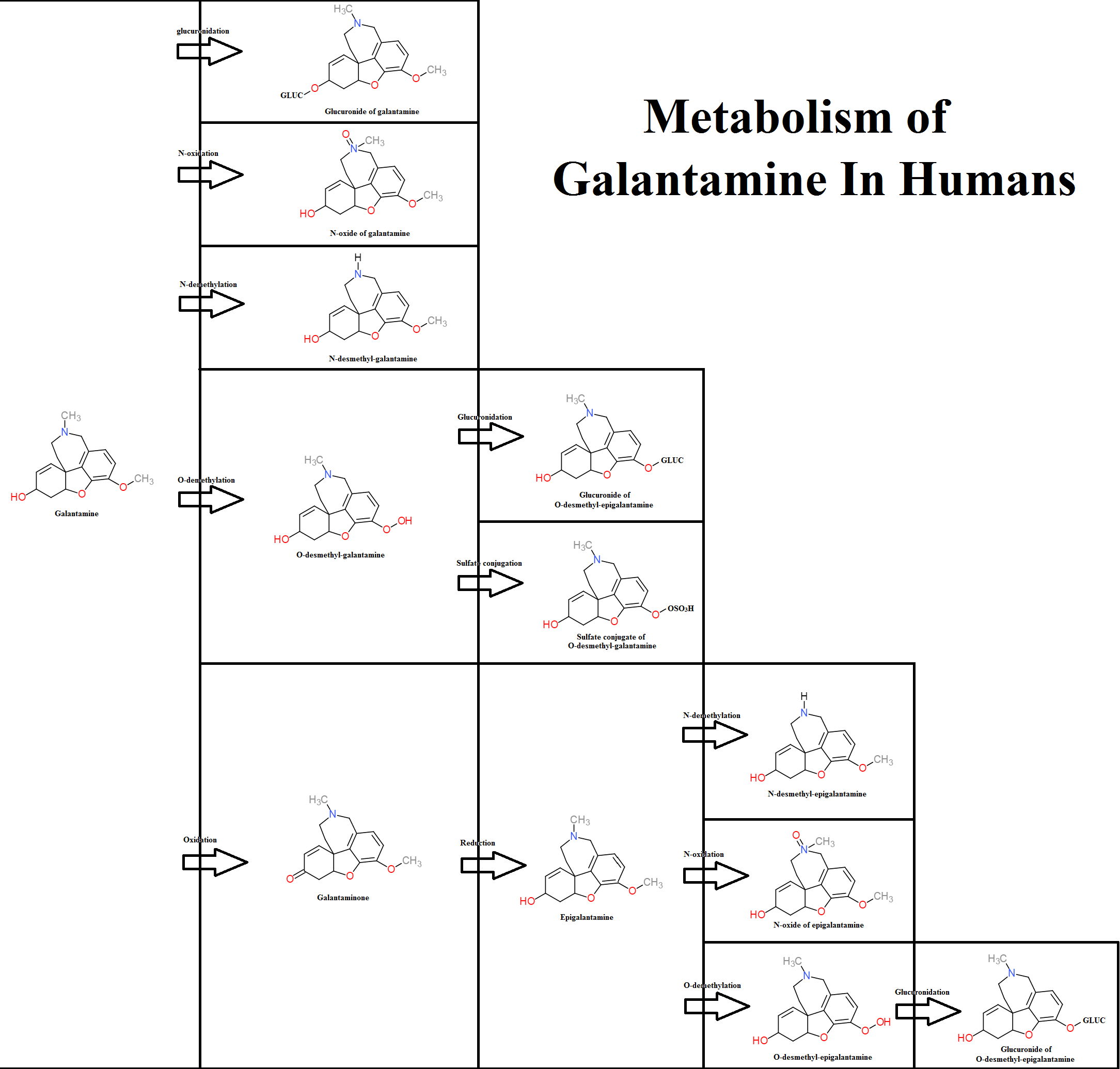
Metabolic pathways of galantamine

== Drug interactions ==
Since galantamine is metabolized by CYP2D6 and CYP3A4, inhibiting either of these isoenzymes will increase the cholinergic effects of galantamine. Inhibiting these enzymes may lead to adverse effects. It was found that paroxetine, an inhibitor of CYP2D6, increased the bioavailability of galantamine by 40%. The CYP3A4 inhibitors ketoconazole and erythromycin increased the bioavailability of galantamine by 30% and 12%, respectively.

== Extraction and synthesis ==
Since the alkaloid is isolated from botanical sources containing low amounts (0.1%) by weight, extraction yields are low. Although galantamine can be produced from natural resources, it also has many industrial syntheses, such as by Janssen, Ortho-McNeil Pharmaceutical, Shire, and Takeda Pharmaceutical Company.

== Research ==
=== Organophosphate poisoning ===
The toxicity of organophosphates results primarily from their action as irreversible inhibitors of acetylcholinesterase. Inhibiting acetylcholinesterase causes an increase in acetylcholine, as the enzyme is no longer available to catalyze its breakdown. In the peripheral nervous system, acetylcholine accumulation can cause an overstimulation of muscarinic receptors followed by a desensitization of nicotinic receptors. This leads to severe skeletal muscle fasciculations (involuntary contractions). The effects on the central nervous system include anxiety, restlessness, confusion, ataxia, tremors, seizures, cardiorespiratory paralysis, and coma. As a reversible acetylcholinesterase inhibitor, galantamine has the potential to serve as an effective organophosphate poisoning treatment by preventing irreversible acetylcholinesterase inhibition. Additionally, galantamine has anticonvulsant properties which may make it even more desirable as an antidote.

Research supported in part by the US Army has led to a US patent application for the use of galantamine and/or its derivatives for treatment of organophosphate poisoning. The indications for use of galantamine in the patent application include poisoning by nerve agents "including but not limited to soman, sarin, and VX, tabun, and Novichok agents". Galantamine was studied in the research cited in the patent application for use along with the well-recognized nerve agent antidote atropine. According to the investigators, an unexpected synergistic interaction occurred between galantamine and atropine in an amount of 6 mg/kg or higher. Increasing the dose of galantamine from 5 to 8 mg/kg decreased the dose of atropine needed to protect experimental animals from the toxicity of soman in dosages 1.5 times the dose generally required to kill half the experimental animals (Median lethal dose, also called LD_{50}).

=== Autism ===
Galantamine given in addition to risperidone to autistic children has been shown to improve some of the symptoms of autism such as irritability, lethargy, and social withdrawal. Additionally, the cholinergic and nicotinic receptors are believed to play a role in attentional processes. Some studies have noted that cholinergic and nicotinic treatments have improved attention in autistic children. As such, it is hypothesized that galantamine's dual action mechanism might have a similar effect in treating autistic children and adolescents.

=== Anesthesia ===
Galantamine may have some limited use in reducing the side-effects of anesthetics ketamine and diazepam. In one study, a control group of patients were given ketamine and diazepam and underwent anesthesia and surgery. The experimental group was given ketamine, diazepam, and nivalin (of which the active ingredient is galantamine). The degree of drowsiness and disorientation of the two groups was then assessed 5, 10, 15, 30 and 60 minutes after surgery. The group that had taken nivalin were found to be more alert 5, 10, and 15 minutes after the surgery.

=== Oneirogen ===
Galantamine is known to have oneirogenic properties. Research has demonstrated its potential to increase dream recall, dream self-awareness and dream vividness. The enhancement of such dream properties can facilitate the induction of lucid dreams.
