= Cholinesterase inhibitor =

Chemical agents that inhibit Cholinesterase

- Drug class

Class identifiers
- Use: Alzheimer's disease; non-medical: pesticide, chemical weapon
- ATC code: N06#N06DA Anticholinesterases
- Mechanism of action: Enzyme inhibitor
- Biological target: Cholinesterase

Clinical data
- Drugs.com: Drug Classes
- WebMD: MedicineNet

External links
- MeSH: D002800

Legal status

Cholinesterase inhibitors (ChEIs) inhibit the enzyme cholinesterase from breaking down the neurotransmitter acetylcholine into choline and acetate. This increases both the level and duration of action of acetylcholine in the central nervous system, autonomic ganglia and neuromuscular junctions, the synaptic clefts of which are rich in acetylcholine receptors. ChEIs are indirect-acting parasympathomimetic drugs.

Both the acetylcholinesterase (AChE) and the butyrylcholinesterase (BChE) play a role in the breakdown of acetylcholine at neuromuscular junctions and ChEIs generally target both. Only a handful are selective enough to be properly called an AChE inhibitor or a BChE inhibitor. (The butyrylcholinesterase is named for its ability to hydrolyze a wider range of choline esters, including butyrylcholine (BCh) in vitro. BCh is not naturally made by the human body.)

As with all enzyme inhibitors, ChEIs are classified as reversible or irreversible, according to how hard they are to dislodge from the active site of the enzyme. Some sources prefer to call the "irreversible" kind quasi-irreversible or pseudo-irreversible, but the distinction appears vague (if present).

Reversible ChEIs may be used as drugs for Alzheimer's and myasthenia gravis. Side effects when used as drugs may include loss of appetite, nausea, vomiting, loose stools, vivid dreams at night, dehydration, rash, bradycardia, peptic ulcer disease, seizures, weight loss, rhinorrhea, salivation, muscle cramps, and fasciculations.

Irreversible ChEIs are often used as chemical weapons and insecticides. Since November 2019 the group of ACheIs known as Novichoks have been banned as agents of warfare under the Chemical Weapons Convention. Novichok agents are neurotoxic organophosphorus compounds and are considered more potent than VX gas, also a neurotoxic organophosphorus compound.

Acetylcholine

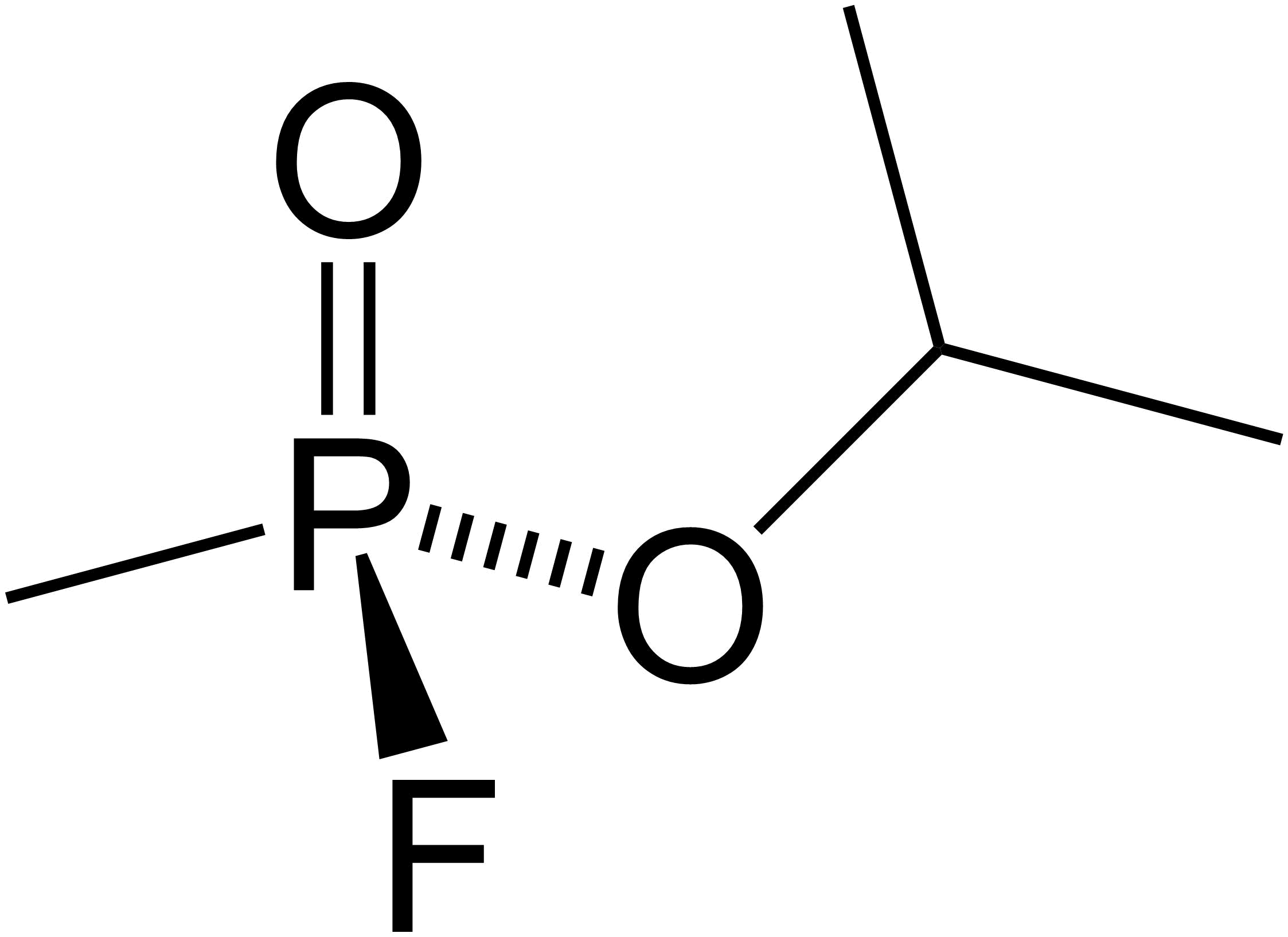
Sarin molecule, C4H10FO2P

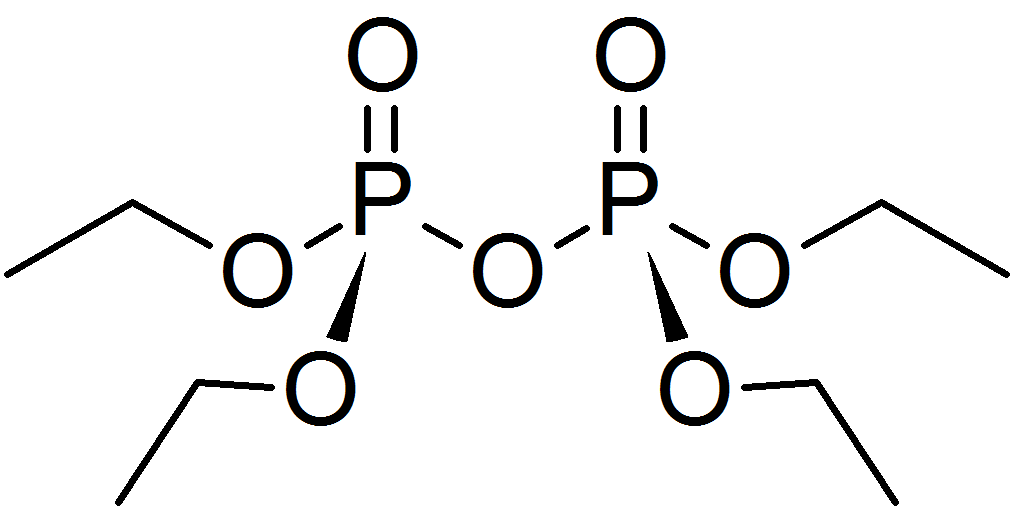
Tetraethyl pyrophosphate molecule, C8H20O7P2

== Medical uses ==
While 4 ChEIs are approved in the US for the treatment of Alzheimer's Disease, only three of these are available commercially. The three available are rivastigmine, donepezil, and galantamine, while tacrine is not. Benzgalantamine has been approved and commercialized in July 2024 for treating Alzheimer's disease, which acts as a prodrug to Galantamine. They are generally used to treat Alzheimer's disease and dementia. If a benefit occurs, it is generally during the second or third month after starting. It is difficult to determine which ChEI has greater efficacy, due to design flaws in head-to-head comparison studies.

The clinical guidelines for medication management in people with dementia recommend trialing an AChE inhibitor for people with early- to mid-stage dementia. These guidelines, known as the Medication Appropriateness Tool for Comorbid Health conditions during Dementia (MATCH-D), suggest that these medicines are at least considered.

Pyridostigmine is used in the treatment of myasthenia gravis.

Neostigmine is used in combination with a muscarinic antagonist to reverse the effects of non-depolarizing muscle relaxants e.g. rocuronium bromide.

=== Expanded list of medical uses ===
- To treat myasthenia gravis, where they are used to increase neuromuscular transmission.
- To treat glaucoma
- To treat postural orthostatic tachycardia syndrome
- As an antidote to anticholinergic poisoning
- To reverse the effect of non-depolarising muscle relaxants
- To treat neuropsychiatric symptoms of diseases such as Alzheimer's disease, particularly apathy
- To increase chances of lucid dreaming (by prolonging REM sleep)
- To treat Alzheimer's disease, the Lewy body dementias and Parkinson's disease. In these neurodegenerative conditions AChEIs are primarily used to treat the cognitive (memory and learning deficits mostly) symptoms of dementia. These symptoms are attenuated due to the role of acetylcholine in cognition in the CNS. There is some evidence to suggest that AChEIs may attenuate psychotic symptoms (especially visual hallucinations) in Parkinson's disease. BChEIs have also received some attention.
- To treat cognitive impairments in patients with schizophrenia. There is some evidence to suggest efficacy in treating positive, negative and affective symptoms.
- As a treatment for autism and to increase the percentage of rapid eye movement sleep in autistic children, in line with the mechanism by which they encourage lucid dreaming.

=== Titration phase ===
When used in the central nervous system to alleviate neurological symptoms, such as rivastigmine in Alzheimer's disease, all cholinesterase inhibitors require doses to be increased gradually over several weeks, and this is usually referred to as the titration phase. Many other types of drug treatments may require a titration or stepping up phase. This strategy is used to build tolerance to adverse events or to reach a desired clinical effect. This also prevents accidental overdose and is therefore recommended when initiating treatment with drugs that are extremely potent and/or toxic (drugs with a low therapeutic index).

== Side effects ==
Potential side effects of acetylcholinesterase inhibitors
mild – generally diminishes	potentially serious
Diarrhea; Headache; Insomnia; Nausea; Vomiting	Abdominal pain; Lack of appetite; Yellowed skin; Dizziness; Slow heartbeat; Sudden or substantial weight loss; Weakness

Some major effects of cholinesterase inhibitors:

- Actions on the parasympathetic nervous system, (the parasympathetic branch of the autonomic nervous system) may cause bradycardia, hypotension, hypersecretion, bronchoconstriction, GI tract hypermotility, and decrease intraocular pressure, increase lower esophageal sphincter (LES) tone
- Cholinergic crisis.
- Actions on the neuromuscular junction may result in prolonged muscle contraction.
- The effects of neostigmine on postoperative nausea and vomiting are controversial and there is not a clear linkage in clinical practice, however, there is good evidence to support the reduction in risk when anticholinergic agents are administered.

Administration of reversible cholinesterase inhibitors is contraindicated with those that have urinary retention due to urethral obstruction.

=== Overdose ===
Hyperstimulation of nicotinic and muscarinic receptors.

Irreversible inhibitors tend to be harder to treat.

== Non-medical uses ==
=== Natural poisons ===
Occur naturally as venoms and poisons (e.g., onchidal).

=== Insecticide ===
ChEIs are used as insecticides. There are two large classes: organophosphates (e.g., malathion) and carbamates(e.g aldicarb).

Resistance is widespread due to various mechanisms, including increased metabolism, gene amplification and enzyme mutations.

=== Chemical weapons ===
ChEIs in the same structural classes as those used as insecticides are used as chemical weapons.

=== Assassination Attempt ===
Cholinesterase inhibitors came to a public attention in 2020 when Russian opposition and dissent figure Alexei Navalny was treated in Berlin Charité hospital for poisoning by a Russian-made nerve agent which is known since 2019 as belonging to the Novichok agents subgroup of ChEI.

== Mechanism of inhibition ==
Acetylcholine

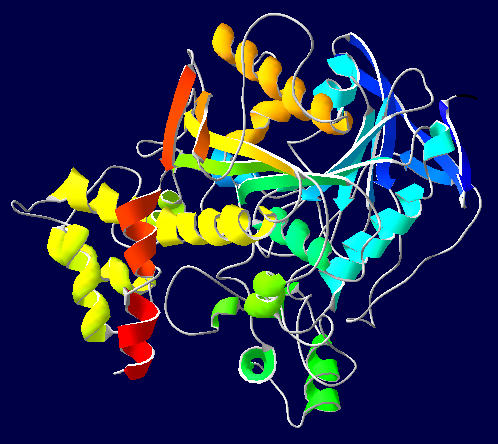
Acetylcholinesterase

To understand the mechanism of ChE inhibition, one must first understand the mechanims of ChEs. As mentioned above, cholinesterases hydrolyze the neurotransmitter acetylcholine. The active site of cholinesterases feature two important sites, namely the anionic site and the esteratic site. After the binding of acetylcholine to the anionic site of the cholinesterase, the acetyl group of acetylcholine can bind to the esteratic site. Important amino acid residues in the esteratic site are a glutamate, a histidine, and a serine. These residues mediate the hydrolysis of the acetylcholine.

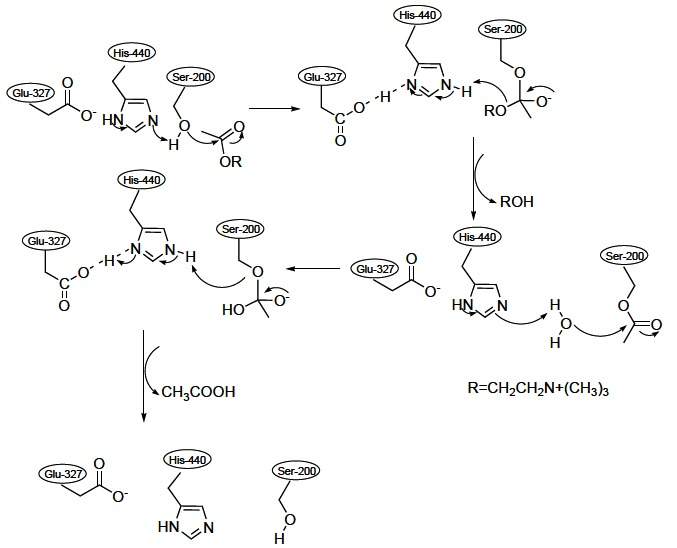
The hydrolysis of acetylcholine, catalyzed by cholinesterase at the esteratic site

At the esteratic site the acetylcholine is cleaved, which results in a free choline moiety and an acetylated cholinesterase. This acetylated state requires hydrolysis to regenerate itself.

=== Organophosphates ===
Organophosphates inhibitors like tetraethyl pyrophosphate (TEPP) and sarin modify the serine residue in the esteratic site of the cholinesterase.

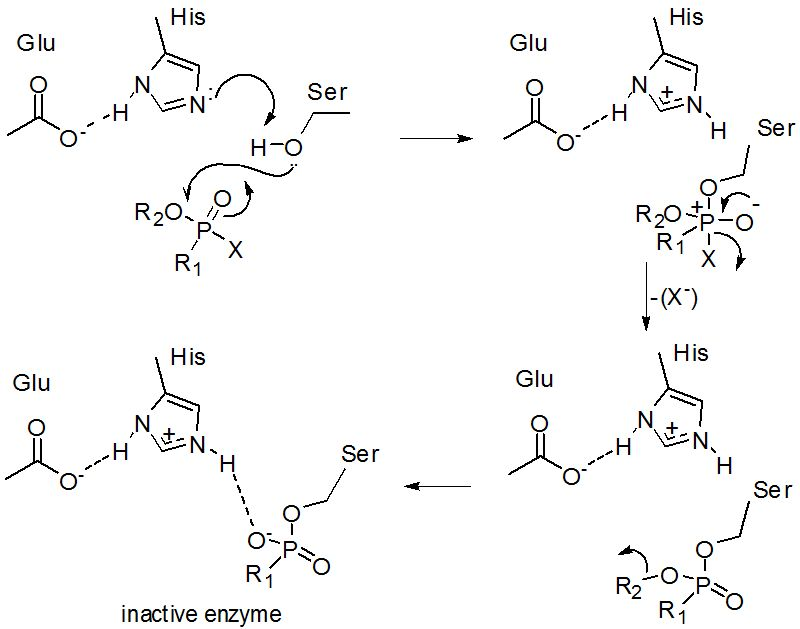
The phosphorylation mechanism by which cholinesterases are inhibited. The organophosphate binds first to the serine residue in the esteratic site of the cholinesterase and after transformation to a phosphate molecule, it binds the histidine residue. This results in occupation of the esteratic site and inhibition of the cleaving activity of the cholinesterase.

This phosphorylation inhibits the binding of the acetyl group of the acetylcholine to the esteratic site of the cholinesterase. Because the acetyl group can't bind the cholinesterase, the acetylcholine can't be cleaved. Therefore, the acetylcholine will remain intact and will accumulate in the synapses. This results in continuous activation of acetylcholine receptors, which leads to the acute symptoms of TEPP poisoning. The phosphorylation of cholinesterase by TEPP (or any other organophosphate) is irreversible. This makes the inhibition of the cholinesterase permanent.

The cholinesterase gets irreversibly phosphorylated according to the following reaction scheme

$\ce{E + PX <=> E-PX ->[k_3] EP + X}$

In this reaction scheme the E indicates the cholinesterase, PX the TEPP molecule, E–PX the reversible phosphorylated cholinesterase, k_{3} the reaction rate of the second step, EP the phosphorylated cholinesterase and X the leaving group of the TEPP.

The irreversible phosphorylation of the cholinesterase occurs in two steps. In the first step the cholinesterase gets reversibly phosphorylated. This reaction is very fast. Then the second step takes place. The cholinesterase forms a very stable complex with TEPP, in which TEPP is covalently bound to the cholinesterase. This is a slow reaction. But after this step the cholinesterase is irreversibly inhibited.

The time dependent irreversible inhibition of the cholinesterase can be described by the following equation.

$$\ln \frac E {E_0} = \frac{k_3 t}{1 + \frac{K_I} I}$$

In this formula, E is the remaining enzyme activity, E_{0} is the initial enzyme activity, t is the time interval after mixing of the cholinesterase and the TEPP, K_{I} is the dissociation constant for cholinesterase-TEPP complex (E–PX) and I is the TEPP concentration.

The reaction mechanism and the formula above are both also compatible for other organophosphates. The process occurs in the same way.

Furthermore, certain organophosphates can cause OPIDN, organophosphate-induced delayed polyneuropathy. This is a disease, which is characterized by degeneration of axons in the peripheral and central nervous system. This disease will show a few weeks after contamination with the organophosphate. It is believed that the neuropathy target esterase (NTE) is affected by the organophosphate which induces the disease. However, there are no references found, which indicate that TEPP is one of the organophosphates that can cause OPIDN.

== Selectivity ==
=== Acetylcholinesterase inhibitors ===
Donepezil, phenserine, huperzine A, and BW284c51 are selective AChE inhibitors.

=== Butyrylcholinesterase inhibitor ===
Tetra (monoisopropyl) pyrophosphoramide (Iso-OMPA) and ethopropazine are selective BChE inhibitors.

=== AChE and BChE inhibitor ===
Paraoxon and rivastigmine are both acetylcholinesterase and butyrylcholinesterase inhibitors.

In 2015, the United States Food and Drug Administration's Adverse Event Reporting System database compared rivastigmine to the other ChEI drugs donepezil and galantamine found that rivastigmine was associated with a higher frequency of reports of death as an adverse event.

=== Acetylcholinesterase inhibitors and nicotinic receptor modulator ===
Galantamine might be less well tolerated than donepezil and rivastigmine.

== Examples ==
=== Reversible inhibitor ===
Compounds which function as reversible competitive or noncompetitive inhibitors of cholinesterase are those most likely to have therapeutic uses. These include:

- Some organophosphates not listed under "Irreversible" below
- Carbamates
  - Physostigmine
  - Neostigmine
  - Pyridostigmine
  - Ambenonium
  - Demecarium
  - Rivastigmine
- Phenanthrene derivatives
  - Galantamine
  - Benzgalantamine
- Caffeine – noncompetitive (also an adenosine receptor antagonist)
- Rosmarinic acid – ester of caffeic acid. Found in plants species of family Lamiaceae.
- Alpha-pinene – noncompetitive reversible
- Piperidines
  - Donepezil
- Tacrine, also known as tetrahydroaminoacridine (THA)
- Edrophonium
- Huperzine A
- Ladostigil
- Ungeremine
- Lactucopicrin
- Acotiamide
- Hybrid/bitopic ligands

==== Comparison table ====
Comparison of reversible acetylcholinesterase inhibitors
Inhibitor	Duration	Main site of action	Clinical use	Adverse effects
Edrophonium	short (10 min.)	neuromuscular junction	diagnosis of myasthenia gravis	
Neostigmine	medium (1–2 hrs.)	neuromuscular junction	Reverse neuromuscular block (intravenously); Treat myasthenia gravis (orally)	visceral
Physostigmine	medium (0.5–5 hrs.)	postganglionic parasympathetic	treat glaucoma (eye drops)	
Pyridostigmine	medium (2–3 hrs.)	neuromuscular junction	Treat myasthenia gravis (orally)	
Dyflos	long	postganglionic parasympathetic	historically to treat glaucoma (eye drops)	toxic
Echothiophate (irreversible)	long	postganglionic parasympathetic	treat glaucoma (eye drops)	systemic effects
Parathion (irreversible)	long	none	toxic	

=== Irreversible inhibitor ===
Compounds which function as irreversible inhibitors of cholinesterase are those most likely to have use as chemical weapons or pesticides.

- Organophosphates
  - Novichoks
  - VR (nerve agent) (Russian VX)
  - Echothiophate
  - Diisopropyl fluorophosphate
  - Cadusafos
  - Chlorpyrifos
  - Cyclosarin (GF)
  - Dichlorvos
  - Dimethoate
  - Metrifonate
  - Sarin (GB)
  - Soman (GD)
  - Tabun (GA)
  - VX
  - VE
  - VG
  - VM
  - Diazinon
  - Malathion
  - Parathion
- Carbamates
  - Aldicarb
  - Bendiocarb
  - Bufencarb
  - Carbaryl
  - Carbendazim
  - Carbetamide
  - Carbofuran
  - Carbosulfan
  - Chlorbufam
  - Chloropropham
  - Ethiofencarb
  - Formetanate
  - Methiocarb
  - Methomyl
  - Oxamyl
  - Phenmedipham
  - Pinmicarb
  - Pirimicarb
  - Propamocarb
  - Propham
  - Propoxur
- Atypical inhibitors
  - Onchidal
  - Coumarins

== See also ==
- Pesticide poisoning
- Parathion S
