= List of Strychnos species =

Strychnos is a genus of plants in the family Loganiaceae. As of August 2024, Plants of the World Online accepted about 200 species.

== A ==
- Strychnos aculeata Soler.
- Strychnos acuta Progel
- Strychnos aenea A.W.Hill
- Strychnos afzelii Gilg
- Strychnos alvimiana Krukoff & Barneby
- Strychnos amazonica Krukoff
- Strychnos andamanensis A.W.Hill
- Strychnos angolensis Gilg
- Strychnos angustiflora Benth.
- Strychnos araguaensis Krukoff & Barneby
- Strychnos asperula Sprague & Sandwith
- Strychnos asterantha Leeuwenb.
- Strychnos atlantica Krukoff & Barneby
- Strychnos axillaris Colebr.

== B ==
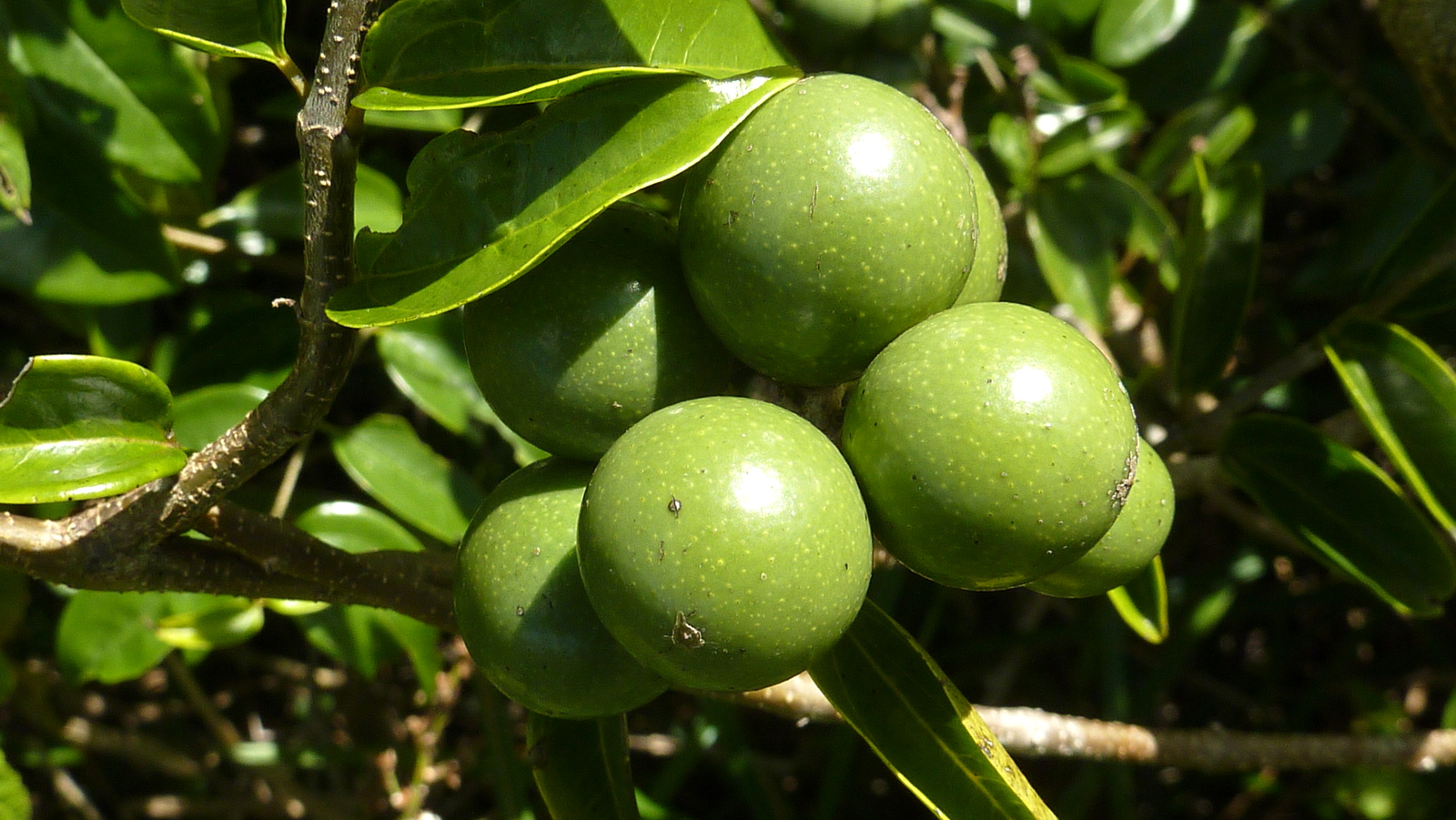
Strychnos brasiliensis

- Strychnos bahiensis Krukoff & Barneby
- Strychnos barnhartiana Krukoff
- Strychnos barteri Soler.
- Strychnos benthamii C.B.Clarke
- Strychnos bicolor Progel
- Strychnos bifurcata Leeuwenb.
- Strychnos boonei De Wild.
- Strychnos borneensis Leenh.
- Strychnos brachiata Ruiz & Pav.
- Strychnos brachistantha Standl.
- Strychnos brasiliensis (Spreng.) Mart.
- Strychnos bredemeyeri (Schult.) Sprague & Sandwith

== C ==
- Strychnos campicola Gilg ex Leeuwenb.
- Strychnos camptoneura Gilg & Busse
- Strychnos canthioides Leeuwenb.
- Strychnos castelnaeana Baill.
- Strychnos cathayensis Merr.
- Strychnos cayennensis Krukoff & Barneby
- Strychnos cerradoensis Krukoff & Barneby
- Strychnos chlorantha Progel
- Strychnos chromatoxylon Leeuwenb.
- Strychnos chrysophylla Gilg
- Strychnos cocculoides Baker
- Strychnos cogens Benth.
- Strychnos colombiensis Krukoff & Barneby
- Strychnos congolana Gilg
- Strychnos coriacea Thwaites
- Strychnos croatii Krukoff & Barneby
- Strychnos cuminodora Leeuwenb.
- Strychnos cuniculina Leeuwenb.
- Strychnos curtisii King & Gamble

== D ==
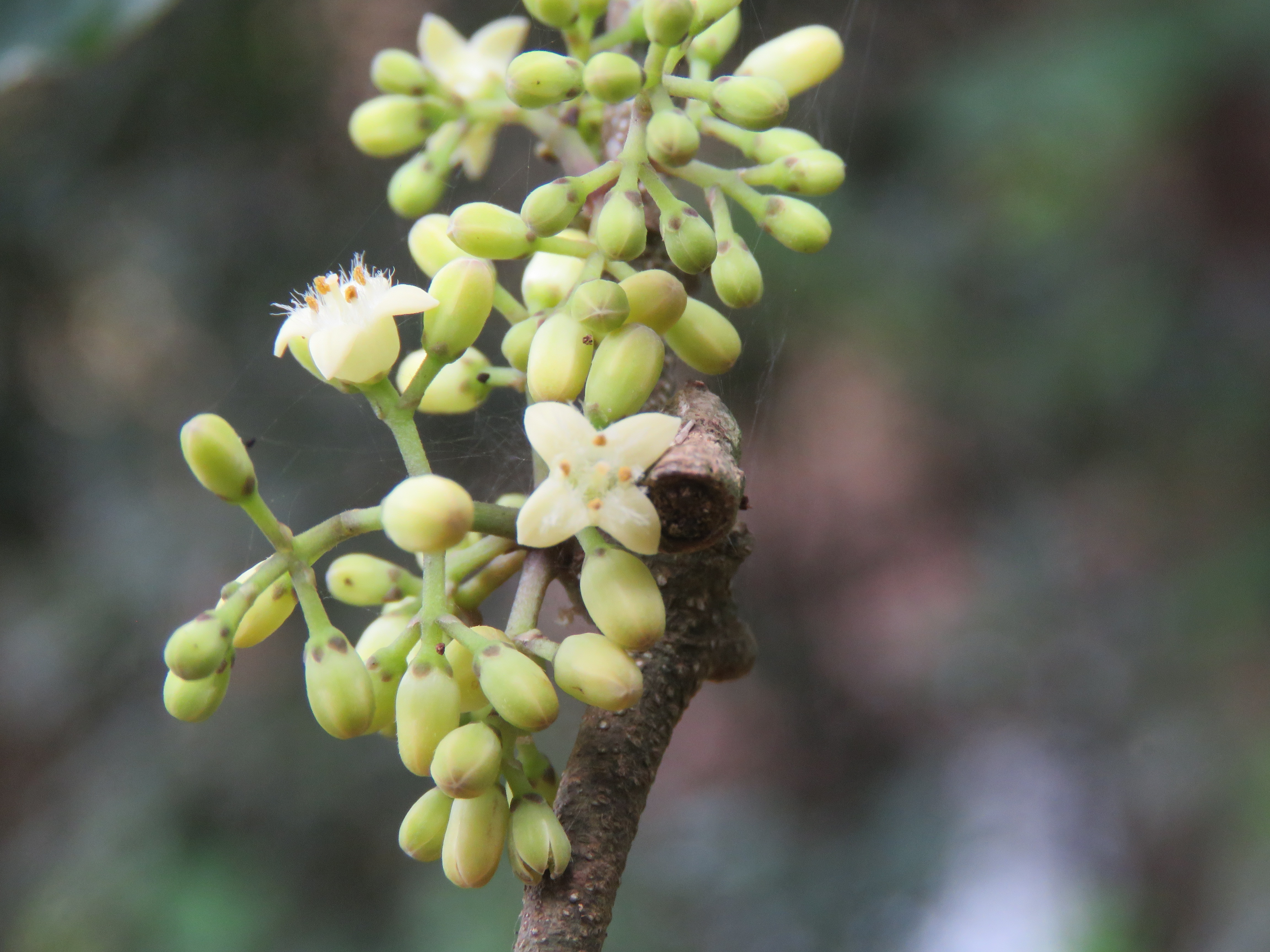
Strychnos dalzellii

- Strychnos daclacensis C.K.Tran
- Strychnos dale De Wild.
- Strychnos dalzellii C.B.Clarke
- Strychnos dantaensis Manoel, Carrijo & E.F.Guim.
- Strychnos darienensis Seem.
- Strychnos davidsei Krukoff & Barneby
- Strychnos decussata (Pappe) Gilg
- Strychnos densiflora Baill.
- Strychnos diaboli Sandwith
- Strychnos dinhensis Pierre ex Dop
- Strychnos dinklagei Gilg
- Strychnos diplotricha Leeuwenb.
- Strychnos divaricans Ducke
- Strychnos dolichothyrsa Gilg ex Onochie & Hepper
- Strychnos duckei Krukoff & Monach.

== E ==
- Strychnos ecuadoriensis Krukoff & Barneby
- Strychnos elaeocarpa Gilg ex Leeuwenb.
- Strychnos erichsonii R.H.Schomb. ex Progel
- Strychnos eugeniifolia Monach.

== F ==
- Strychnos fallax Leeuwenb.
- Strychnos fendleri Sprague & Sandwith
- Strychnos flavescens King & Gamble
- Strychnos floribunda Gilg
- Strychnos froesii Ducke
- Strychnos fulvotomentosa Gilg

== G ==
- Strychnos gardneri A.DC.
- Strychnos gerrardii N.E.Br.
- Strychnos glabra Sagot ex Progel
- Strychnos gnetifolia Gilg ex Onochie & Hepper
- Strychnos goiasensis Krukoff & Barneby
- Strychnos gossweileri Exell
- Strychnos grayi Griseb.
- Strychnos gubleri G.Planch.
- Strychnos guianensis (Aubl.) Mart.

== H ==
- Strychnos henningsii Gilg
- Strychnos hirsuta Spruce ex Benth.

== I ==
- Strychnos icaja Baill.
- Strychnos ignatii P.J.Bergius
- Strychnos innocua Delile

== J ==
- Strychnos jacarepiensis Manoel & E.F.Guim.
- Strychnos javariensis Krukoff
- Strychnos jobertiana Baill.
- Strychnos johnsonii Hutch. & M.B.Moss

== K ==
- Strychnos kasengaensis De Wild.
- Strychnos krukoffiana Ducke

== L ==
- Strychnos lanata A.W.Hill
- Strychnos ledermannii Gilg & Gilg-Ben.
- Strychnos leenhoutsii Tirel
- Strychnos lobelioides Krukoff & Barneby
- Strychnos longicaudata Gilg
- Strychnos lucens Baker
- Strychnos lucida R.Br.
- Strychnos luzonensis Elmer

== M ==
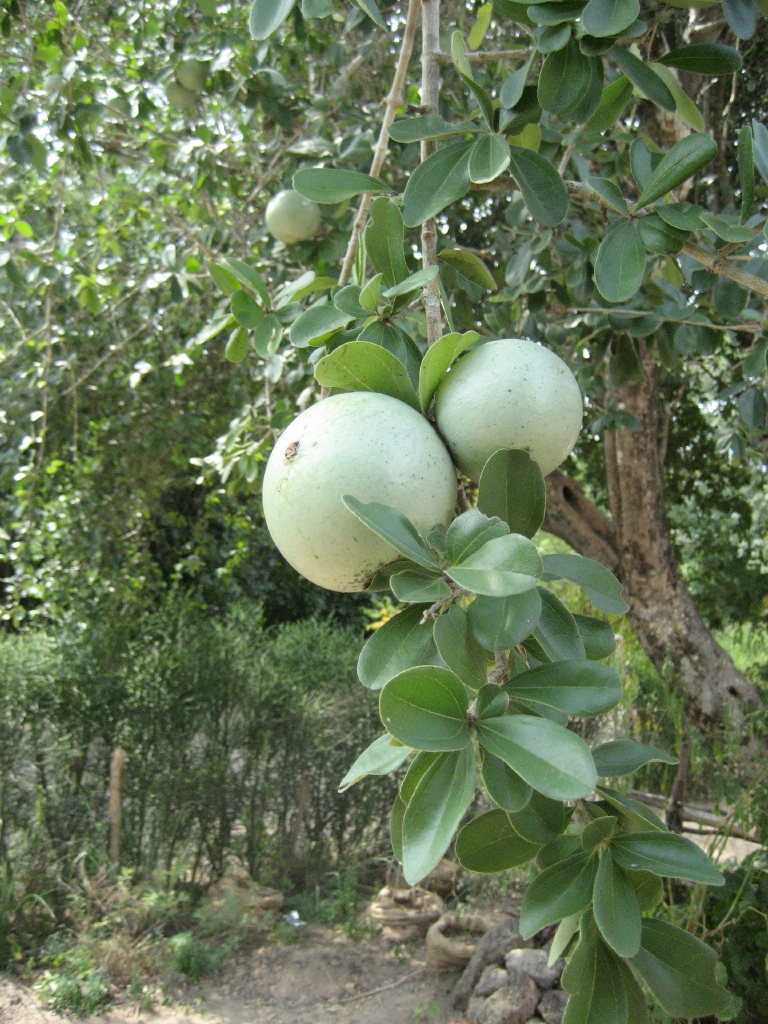
Strychnos madagascariensis

- Strychnos madagascariensis Poir.
- Strychnos maingayi C.B.Clarke
- Strychnos malacoclados C.H.Wright
- Strychnos malacosperma Ducke & Fróes
- Strychnos malchairii De Wild.
- Strychnos matopensis S.Moore
- Strychnos mattogrossensis S.Moore
- Strychnos medeola Sagot ex Progel
- Strychnos melanocarpa Gilg & Gilg-Ben.
- Strychnos melastomatoides Gilg
- Strychnos melinoniana Baill.
- Strychnos mellodora S.Moore
- Strychnos memecyloides S.Moore
- Strychnos millepunctata Leeuwenb.
- Strychnos mimfiensis Gilg ex Leeuwenb.
- Strychnos minor Dennst.
- Strychnos mitis S.Moore
- Strychnos mitscherlichii M.R.Schomb.
- Strychnos moandaensis De Wild.
- Strychnos mostueoides Leeuwenb.
- Strychnos myrioneura Gilg
- Strychnos myrtoides Gilg & Busse

== N ==
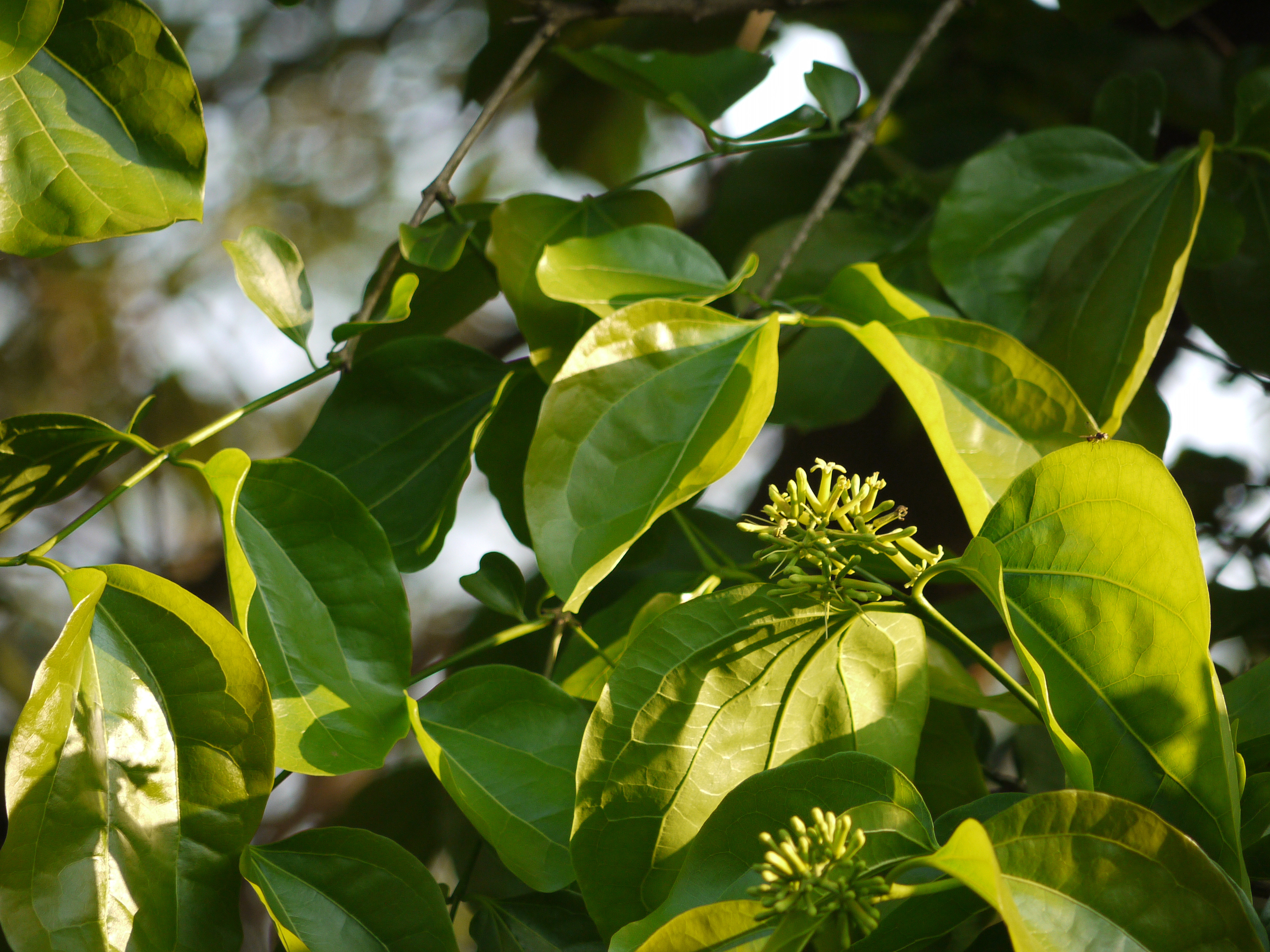
Strychnos nux-vomica

- Strychnos nana E.S.Brandão
- Strychnos narcondamensis A.W.Hill
- Strychnos ndengensis Pellegr.
- Strychnos neglecta Krukoff & Barneby
- Strychnos ngouniensis Pellegr.
- Strychnos nicaraguensis Huft
- Strychnos nigricans Progel
- Strychnos nigritana Baker
- Strychnos nitida G.Don
- Strychnos nux-blanda A.W.Hill
- Strychnos nux-vomica L.

== O ==
- Strychnos odorata A.Chev.
- Strychnos oiapocensis Fróes
- Strychnos oleifolia A.W.Hill
- Strychnos ovata A.W.Hill

== P ==
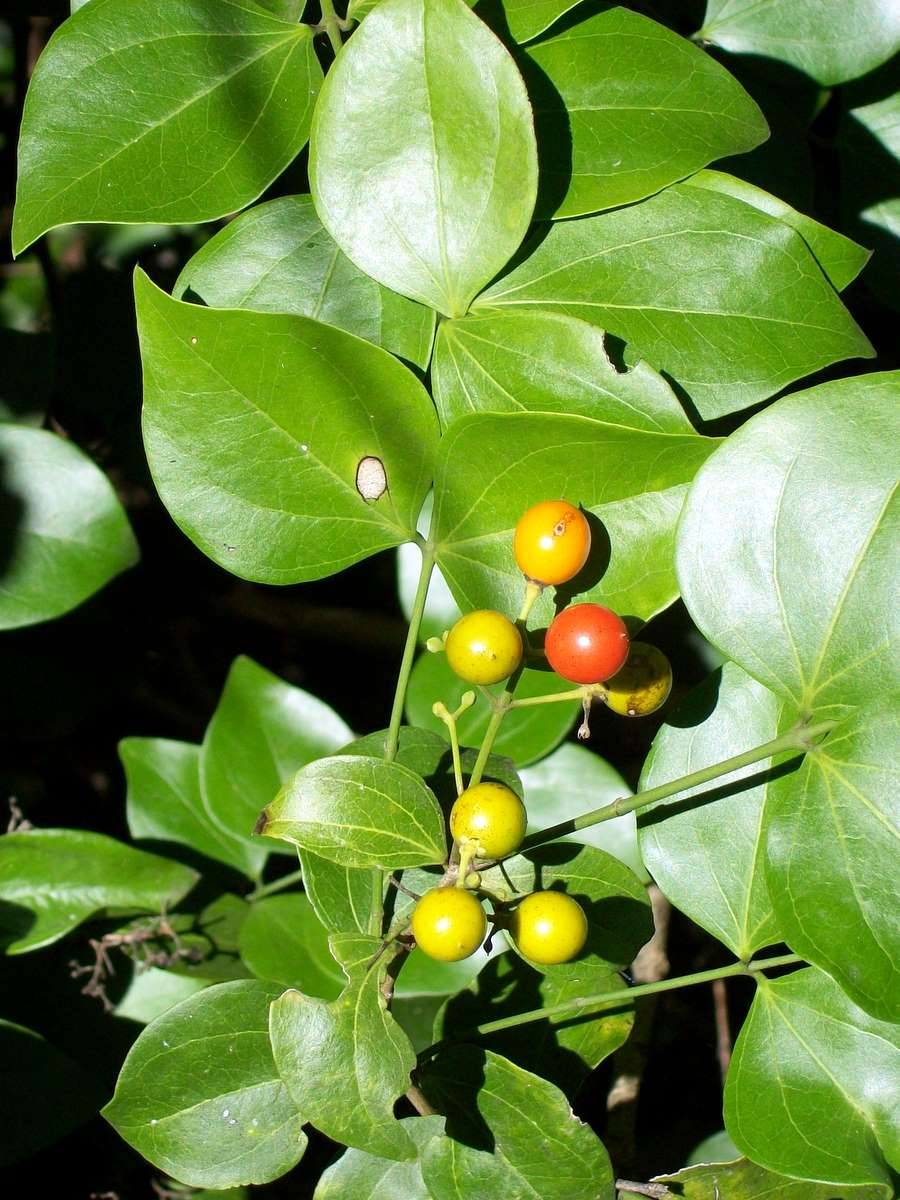
Strychnos psilosperma

- Strychnos pachycarpa Ducke
- Strychnos panamensis Seem.
- Strychnos panganensis Gilg
- Strychnos parviflora Spruce ex Benth.
- Strychnos parvifolia A.DC.
- Strychnos peckii B.L.Rob.
- Strychnos penninervis A.Chev.
- Strychnos pentantha Leeuwenb.
- Strychnos phaeotricha Gilg
- Strychnos poeppigii Progel
- Strychnos polyantha Pierre ex Dop
- Strychnos polytrichantha Gilg
- Strychnos potatorum L.f.
- Strychnos progeliana Krukoff & Barneby
- Strychnos pseudoquina A.St.-Hil.
- Strychnos psilosperma F.Muell.
- Strychnos puberula McPherson
- Strychnos pubescens C.B.Clarke
- Strychnos pubiflora Krukoff
- Strychnos pungens Soler.

== R ==
- Strychnos ramentifera Ducke
- Strychnos recognita Krukoff & Barneby
- Strychnos retinervis Leeuwenb.
- Strychnos ridleyi King & Gamble
- Strychnos romeu-belenii Krukoff & Barneby
- Strychnos rondeletioides Spruce ex Benth.
- Strychnos rubiginosa A.DC.
- Strychnos rufa C.B.Clarke
- Strychnos rupicola Pierre ex Dop

== S ==
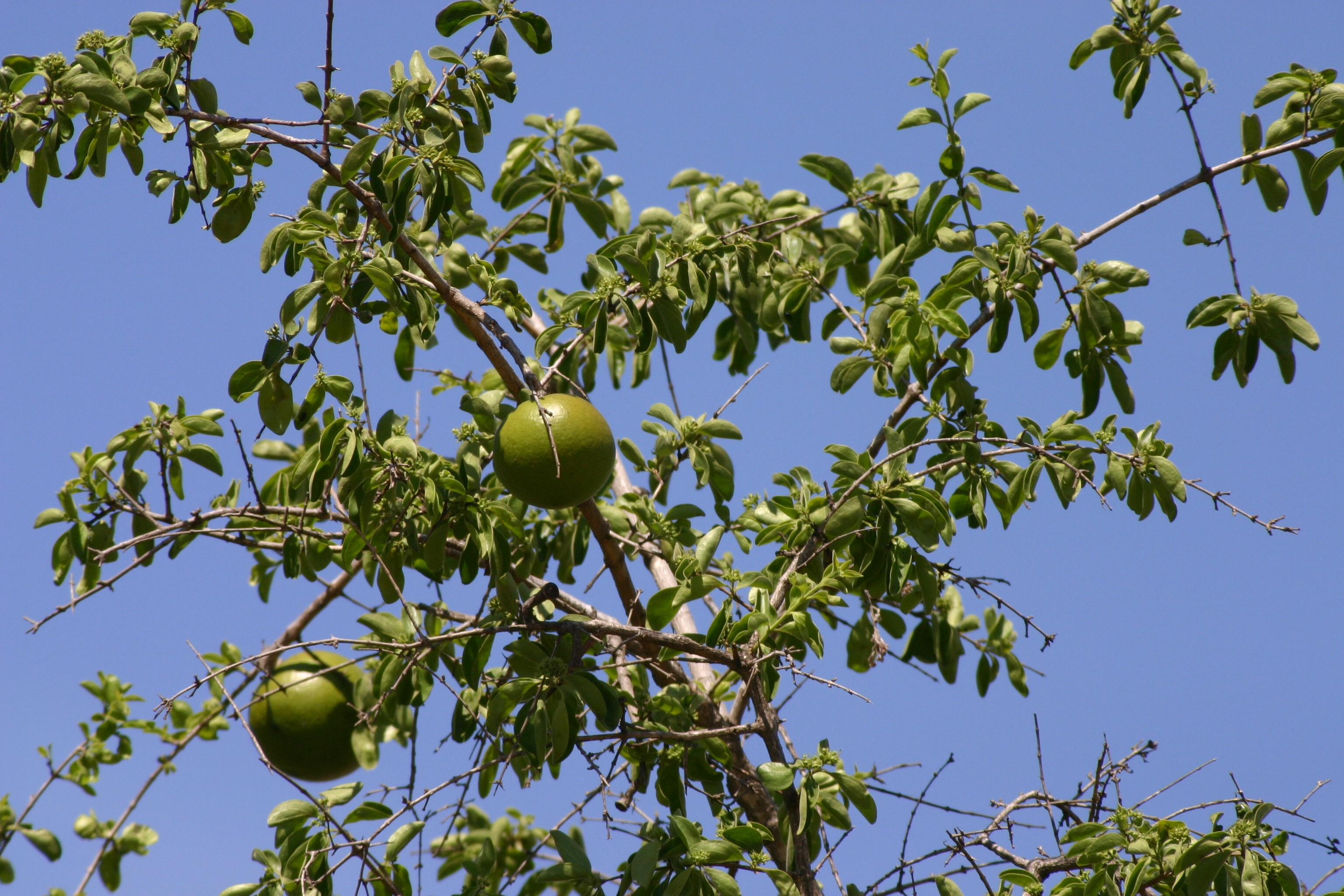
Strychnos spinosa

- Strychnos samba P.A.Duvign.
- Strychnos sandwithiana Krukoff & Barneby
- Strychnos scheffleri Gilg
- Strychnos schultesiana Krukoff
- Strychnos schunkei Krukoff & Barneby
- Strychnos setosa Krukoff & Barneby
- Strychnos solerederi Gilg
- Strychnos solimoesana Krukoff
- Strychnos sonlaensis C.K.Tran
- Strychnos soubrensis Hutch. & Dalziel
- Strychnos spinosa Lam.
- Strychnos splendens Gilg
- Strychnos staudtii Gilg
- Strychnos subcordata Spruce ex Benth.

== T ==
- Strychnos tabascana Sprague & Sandwith
- Strychnos talbotiae S.Moore
- Strychnos tarapotensis Sprague & Sandwith
- Strychnos tchibangensis Pellegr.
- Strychnos ternata Gilg ex Leeuwenb.
- Strychnos tetragona A.W.Hill
- Strychnos thorelii Pierre ex Dop
- Strychnos tomentosa Benth.
- Strychnos torresiana Krukoff & Monach.
- Strychnos toxifera R.H.Schomb. ex Lindl.
- Strychnos tricalysioides Hutch. & M.B.Moss
- Strychnos trichocalyx A.W.Hill
- Strychnos trichoneura Leeuwenb.
- Strychnos trinervis (Vell.) Mart.
- Strychnos tseasnum Krukoff & Barneby

== U ==
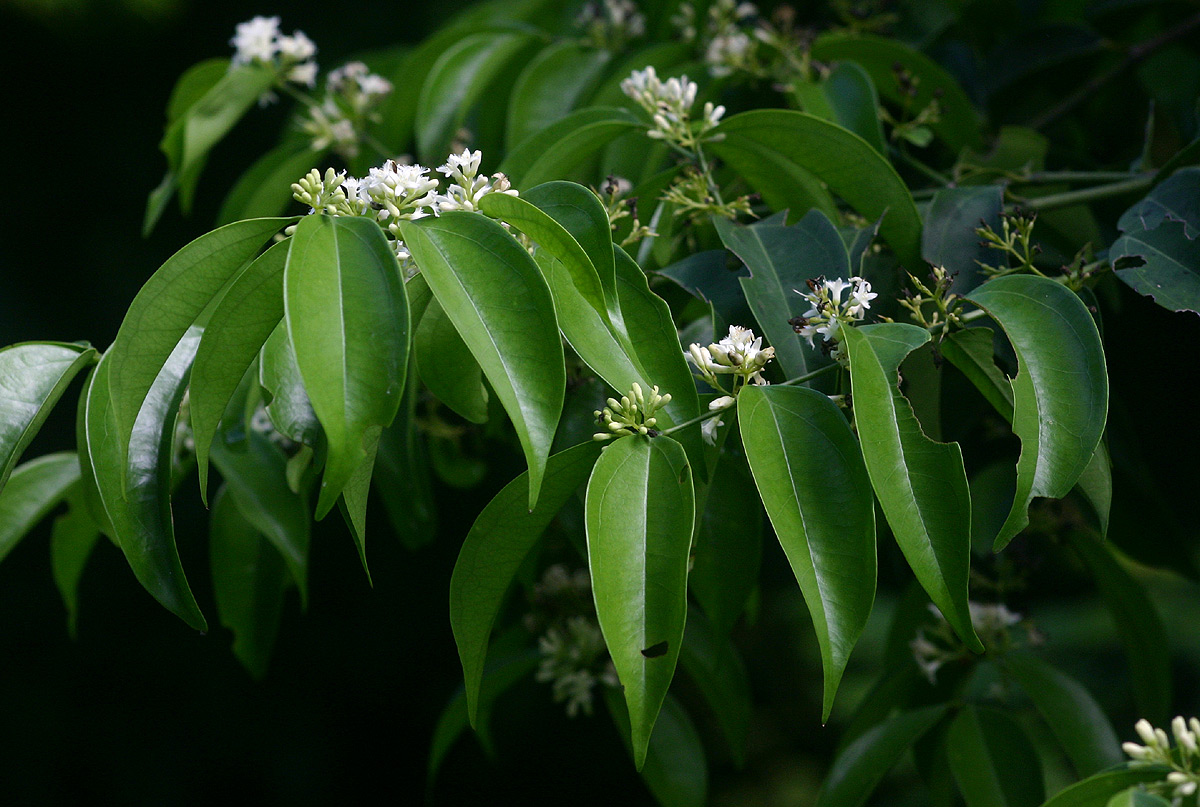
Strychnos usambarensis

- Strychnos umbellata (Lour.) Merr.
- Strychnos urceolata Leeuwenb.
- Strychnos usambarensis Gilg ex Engl.

== V ==
- Strychnos vanprukii Craib
- Strychnos variabilis De Wild.
- Strychnos villosa A.W.Hill
- Strychnos vitiensis A.W.Hill

== W ==
- Strychnos wallichiana Steud. ex A.DC.

== X ==
- Strychnos xantha Leeuwenb.
- Strychnos xylophylla Gilg

== Z ==
- Strychnos zenkeri Gilg ex Baker
