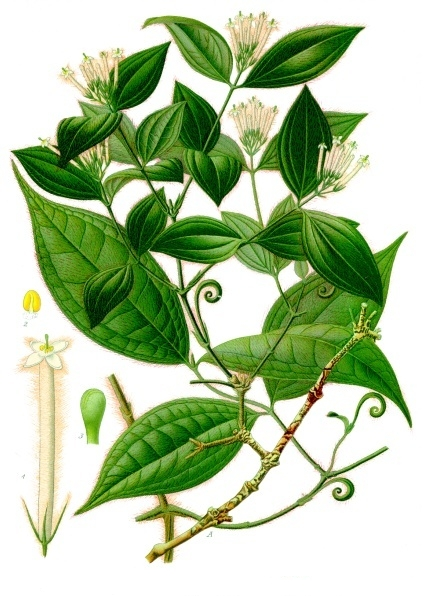
- Strychnos toxifera

Scientific classification
- Kingdom: Plantae
- Clade: Embryophytes
- Clade: Tracheophytes
- Clade: Spermatophytes
- Clade: Angiosperms
- Clade: Eudicots
- Clade: Asterids
- Order: Gentianales
- Family: Loganiaceae
- Genus: Strychnos; L.

Species
- See text

Diversity
- c. 200 species

Synonyms
- Atherstonea Pappe; Brehmia Harv.; Chemnicia Scop.; Curare Kunth ex Humb.; Ignatia L.f.; Ignatiana Lour.; Lasiostoma Schreb.; Narda Vell.; Rouhamon Aubl.; Scyphostrychnos S.Moore; Toxicaria Schreb.; Unguacha Hochst.

= Strychnos =

Genus of flowering plants

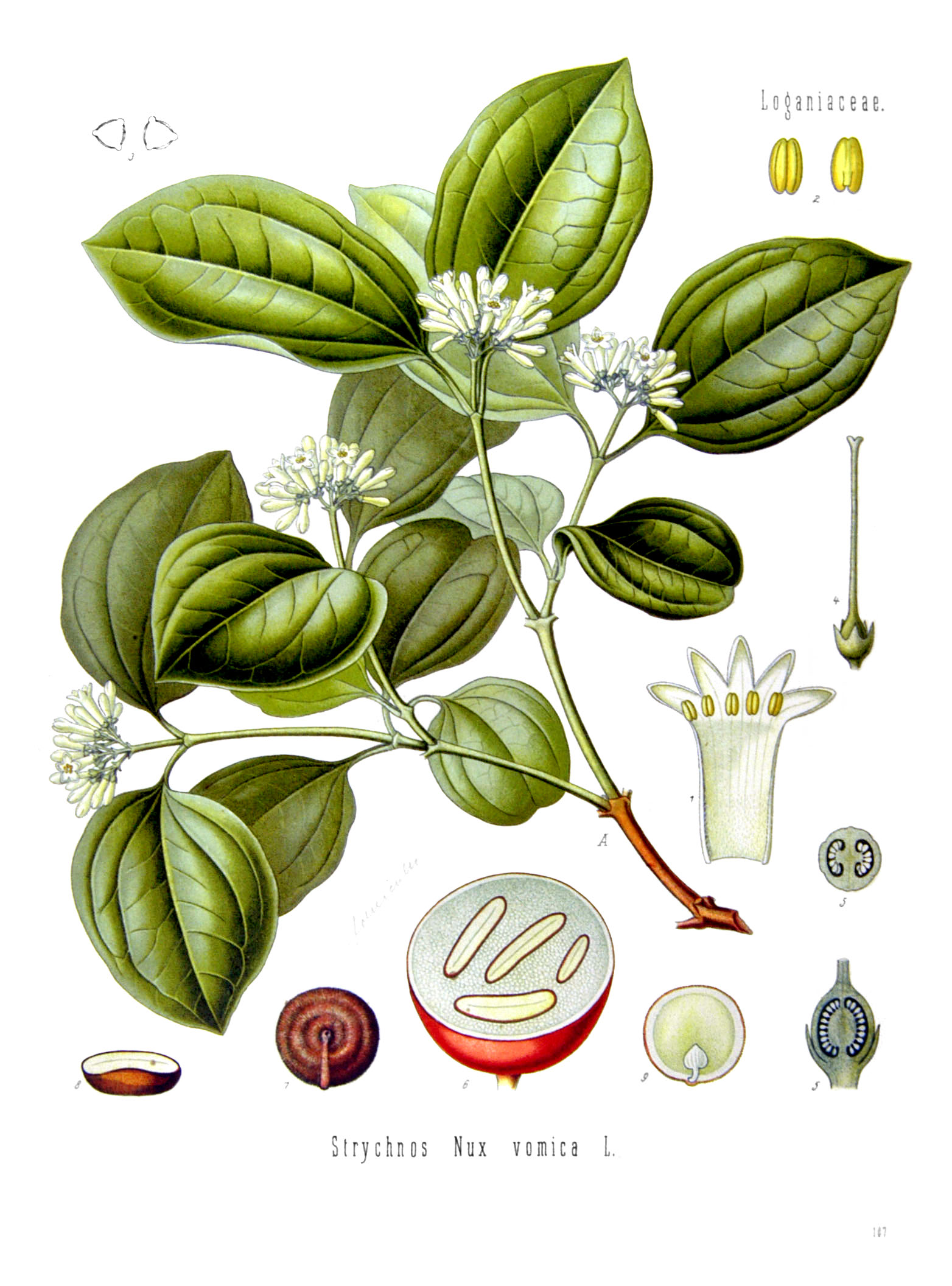
Strychnos nux-vomica, the strychnine tree

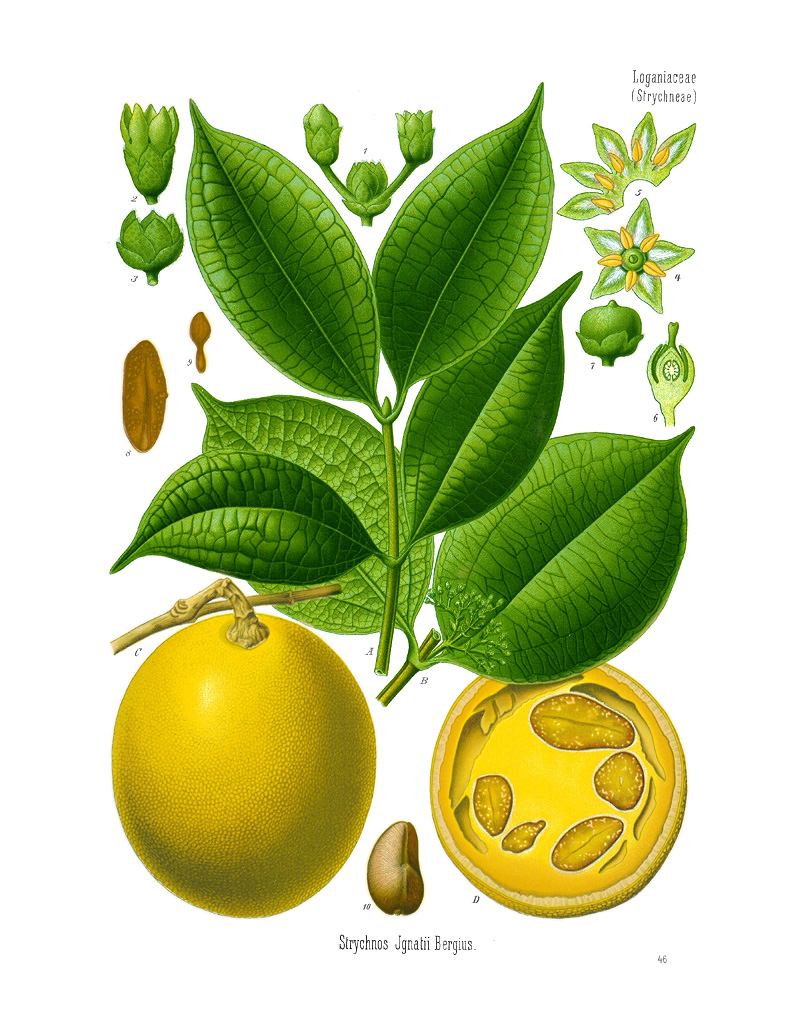
Strychnos ignatii, the "bean of St. Ignatius"—another source of the very toxic, convulsant indole alkaloid strychnine

Strychnos is a genus of flowering plants, belonging to the family Loganiaceae (sometimes Strychnaceae). The genus includes about 200 accepted species of trees and lianas. The genus is widely distributed around the world's tropics and is noted for the presence of poisonous indole alkaloids in the roots, stems and leaves of various species. Among these alkaloids are the well-known and deadly poisons strychnine and curare.

== Etymology ==
The name strychnos was applied by Pliny the Elder in his Natural History to Solanum nigrum. The word is derived from the Ancient Greek στρύχνον (strúkhnon) – "acrid", "bitter". The meaning of the word strychnos was not fixed in Ancient Greece, where it could designate a variety of different plants having in common the property of toxicity.

== Distribution ==
The genus has a pantropical distribution.

== Taxonomy ==
The genus is divided into 12 sections, though it is conceded that the sections do not reflect evolution of the genus, and all sections except Spinosae are polyphyletic:

- Strychnos (53 species)
- Rouhamon (21 species)
- Breviflorae (32 species)
- Penicillatae (17 species)
- Aculeatae (1 species)
- Spinosae (4 species)
- Brevitubae (18 species)
- Lanigerae (32 species)
- Phaeotrichae (1 species)
- Densiflorae (8 species)
- Dolichantae (9 species)
- Schyphostrychnos (1 species)

== Selected species ==
- Strychnos benthami C.B.Clarke
- Strychnos camptoneura Gilg & Busse
- Strychnos chromatoxylon Leeuwenb.
- Strychnos cocculoides Baker
- Strychnos elaeocarpa Gilg ex Leeuwenb.
- Strychnos icaja Baill.
- Strychnos ignatii P.J. Bergius
- Strychnos madagascariensis Poir.
- Strychnos mellodora S.Moore
- Strychnos millepunctata Leeuwenb.
- Strychnos nux-blanda A.W.Hill
- Strychnos nux-vomica L.
- Strychnos potatorum L.f.
- Strychnos psilosperma F.Muell.
- Strychnos pungens Soler.
- Strychnos spinosa Lam.
- Strychnos staudtii Gilg
- Strychnos tetragona A.W.Hill
- Strychnos toxifera R.H.Schomb. ex Lindl.
- Strychnos usambarensis Gilg ex Engl.

- The strychnine tree, Strychnos nux-vomica, native to tropical Asia, is the source of the poison strychnine.
- Strychnos tonga, native to Tonga, is a synonym of Strychnos spinosa.
- Strychnos ignatii ("St. Ignatius bean"), is a closely related Asian shrub/tree.
- The species Strychnos toxifera is a principal plant source of the arrow poison curare.
- Three trees from Southern Africa, commonly known as "monkey oranges", are drought-tolerant and produce popular edible fruits: the corky-barked monkey orange or suurklapper, Strychnos cocculoides; the Natal orange or green or spiny monkey orange, Strychnos spinosa; and the black or spiny-leaved monkey orange Strychnos pungens.
- The ripe seeds of Strychnos potatorum, known as Therran or Nirmal, can be ground and used as a coagulant to purify water; or they may be rubbed against the inside walls of the earthenware water containers. Mrs Grieve's Herbal of 1931 also mentions traditional water purification uses of an Indian species called Strychnos pseudo (not a valid botanical name).
- Two very well preserved fossilised corollas with stamens and styles from flowers of a plant that has been named Strychnos electri (the Latin name of amber is electrum), believed to be a vine, were discovered in amber from the Dominican Republic. The amber is from tropical tree Hymenaea protera, formerly abundant but now extinct, which formed part of the forest canopy. The age of the amber is believed to be between 15 and 45 million years, from the mid-Tertiary period. This demonstrates an early date for these plants.

== Gallery ==
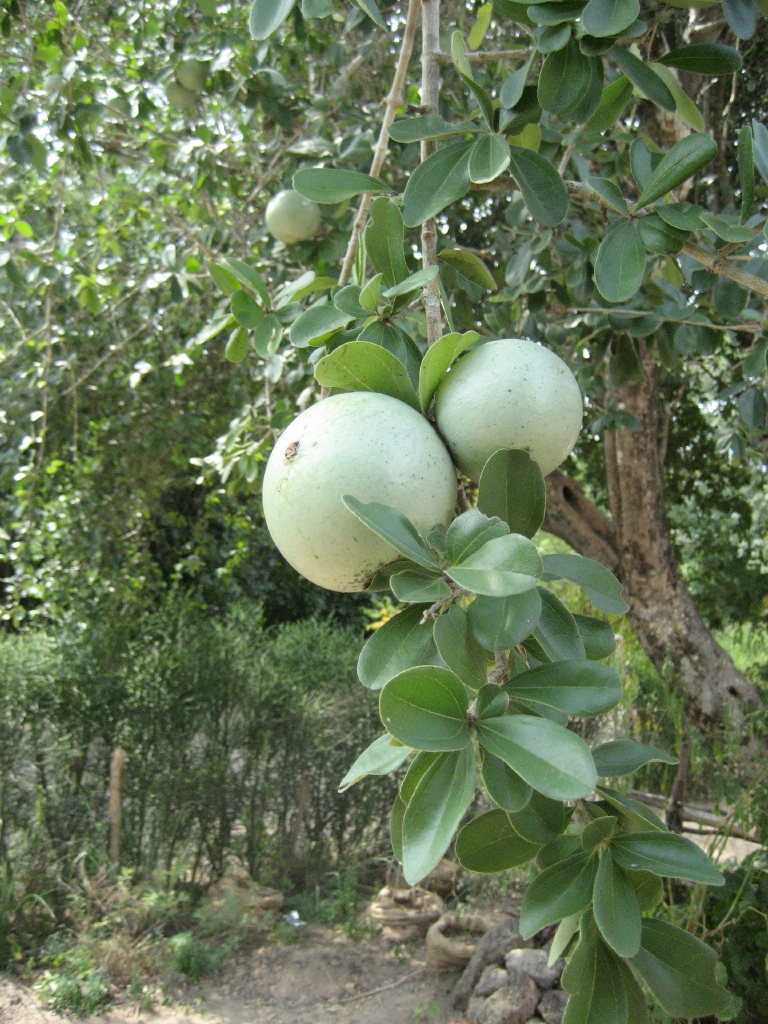
Strychnos madagascariensis

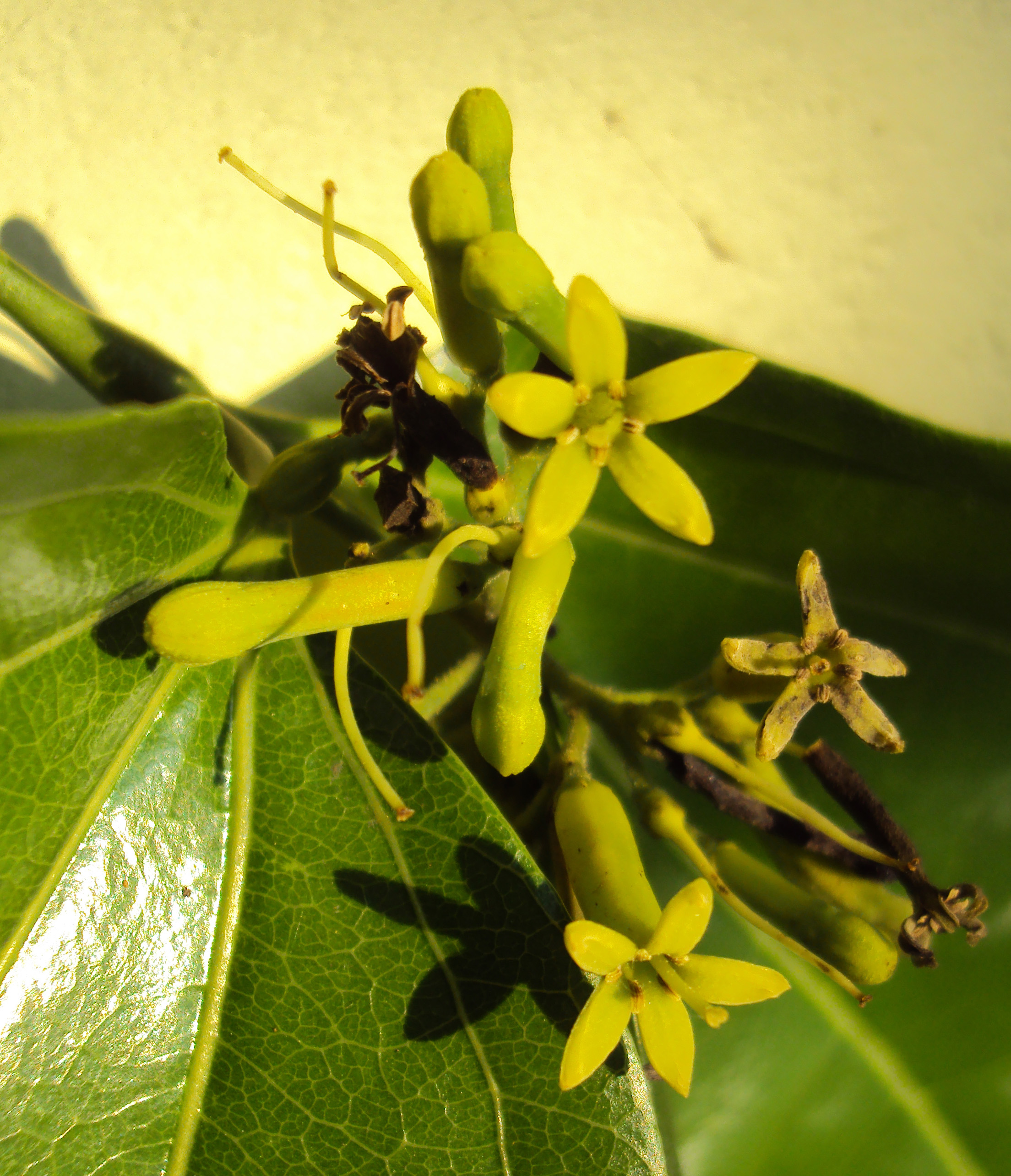
Strychnos nux-vomica flowers

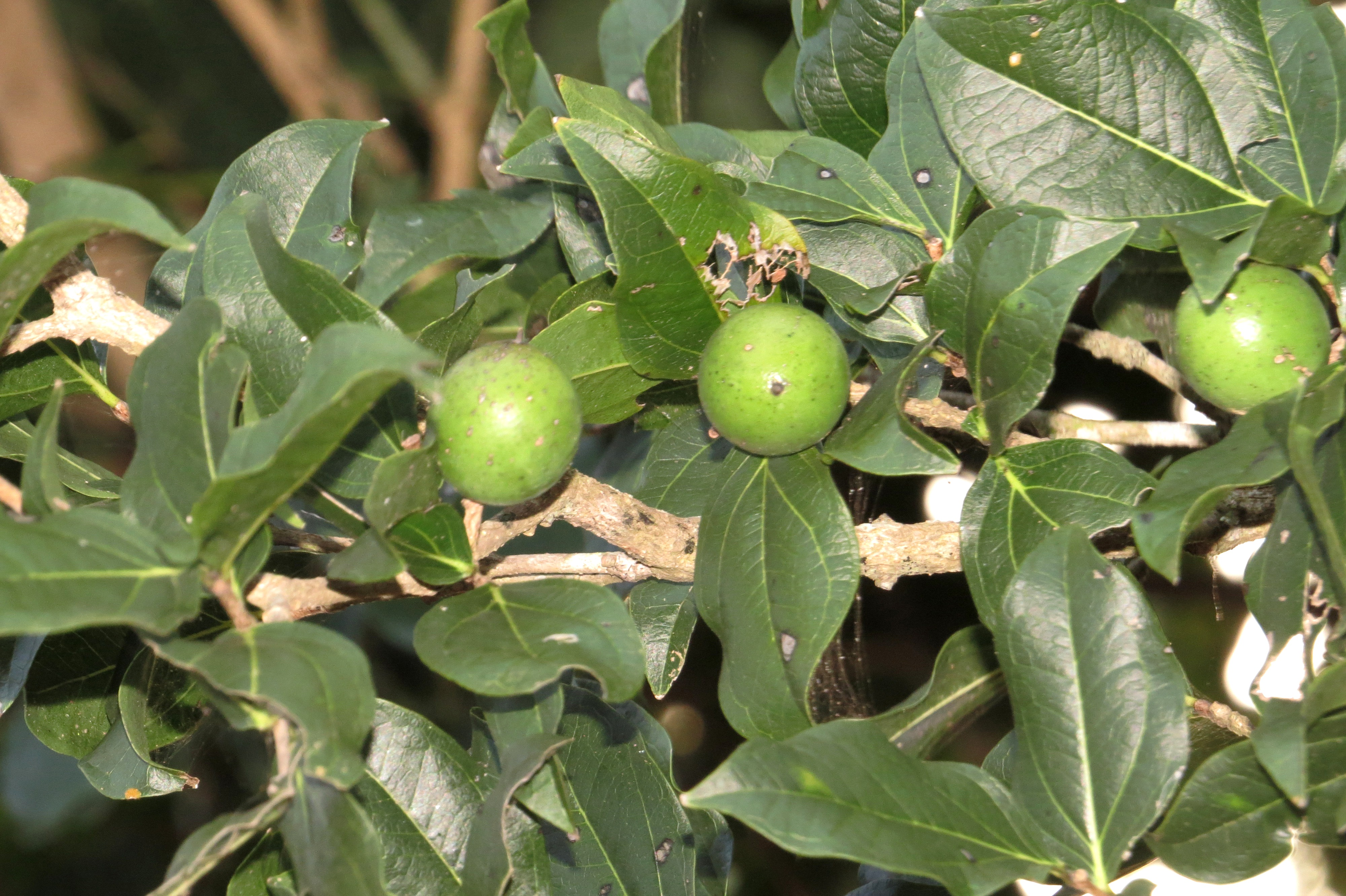
Strychnos potatorum

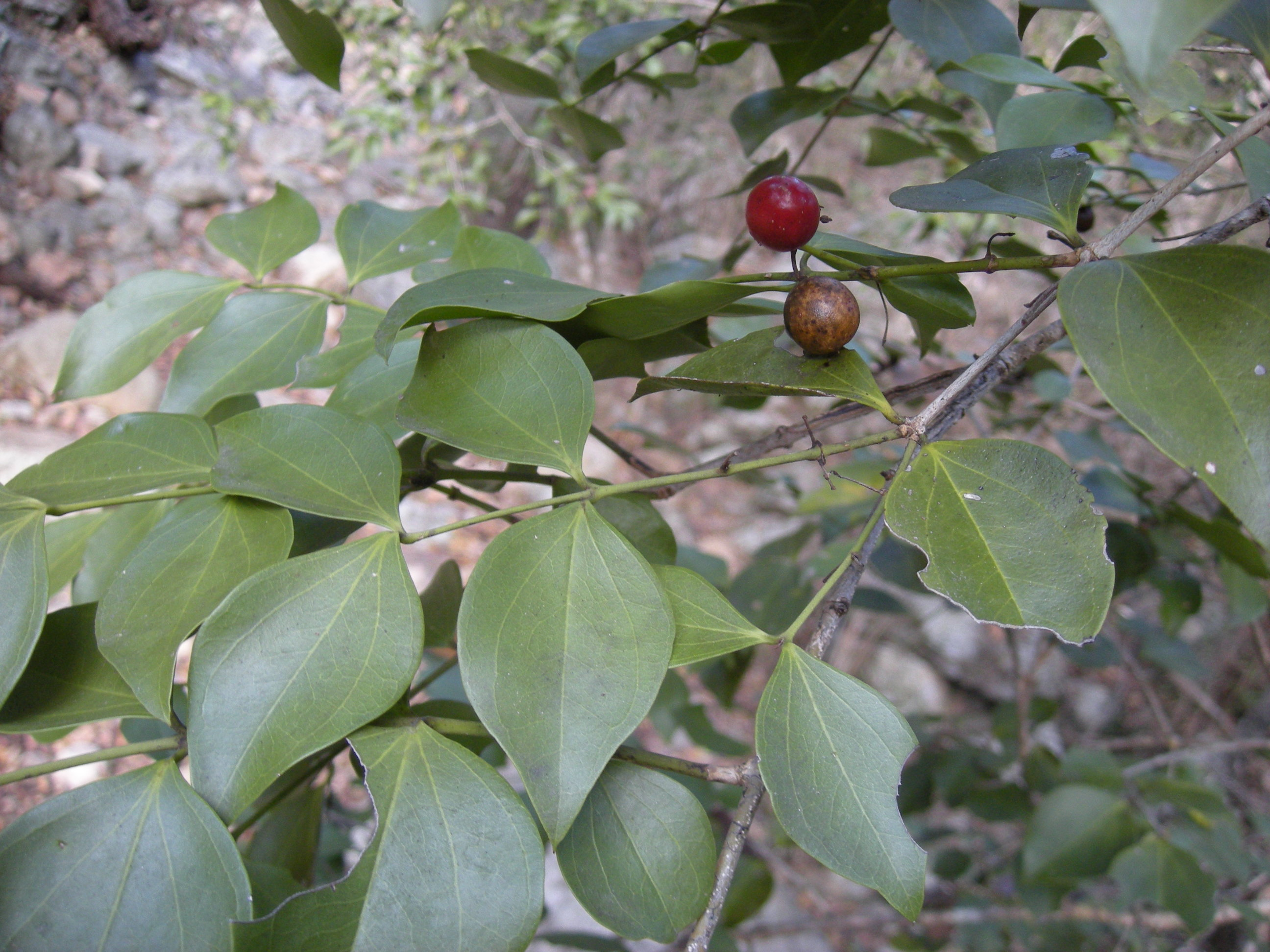
Strychnos psilosperma

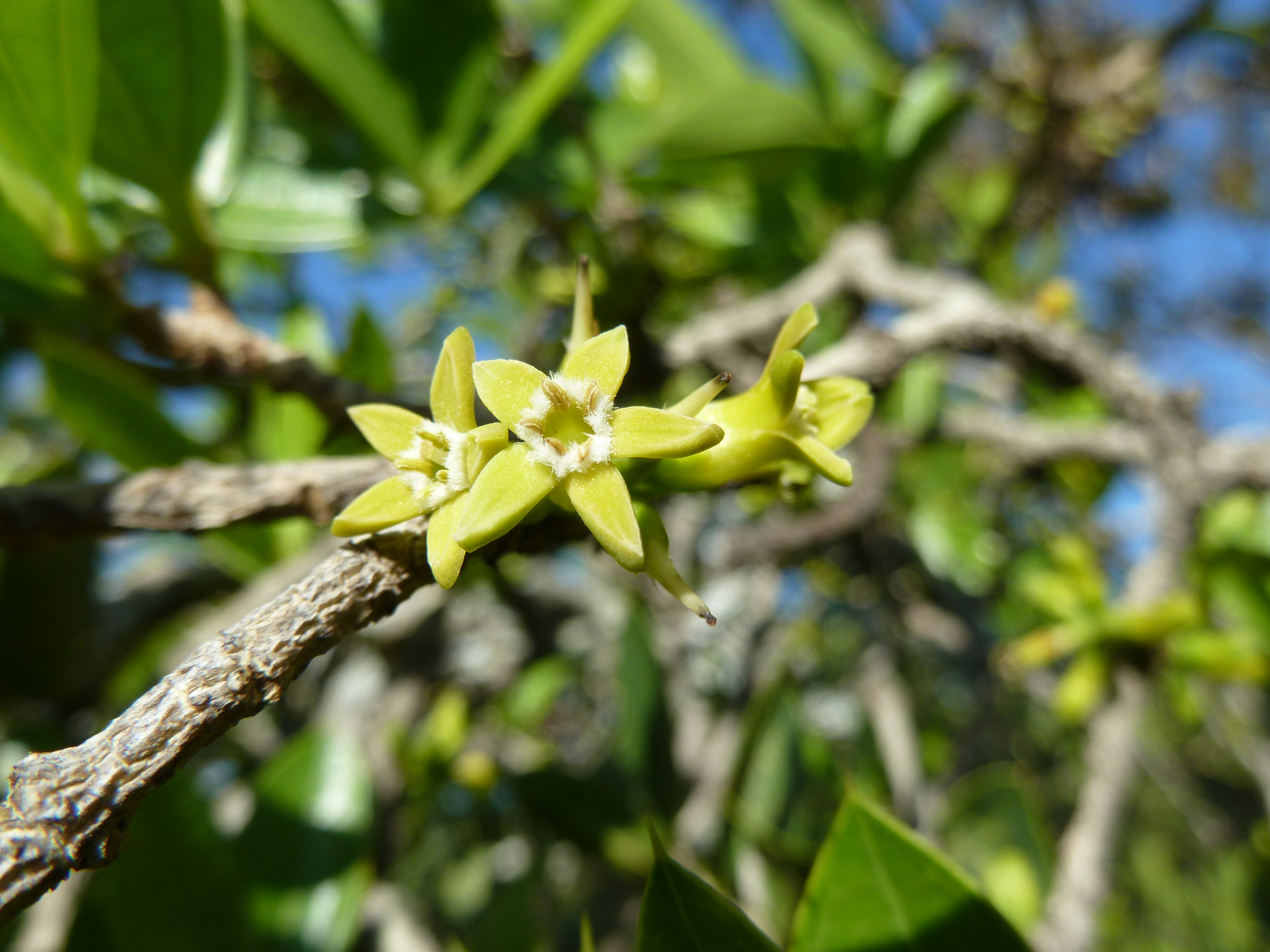
Strychnos pungens flowers

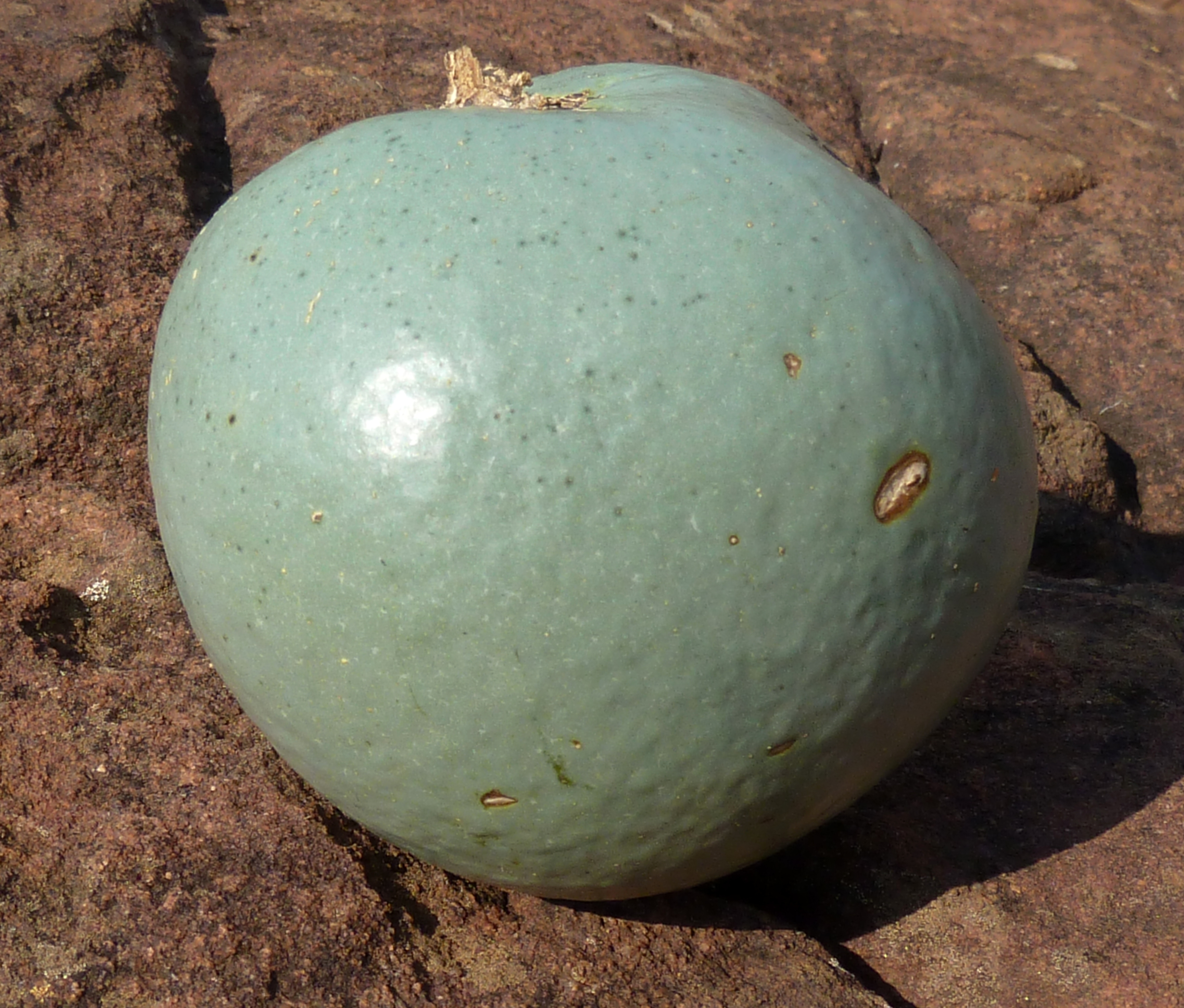
Strychnos pungens detached fruit

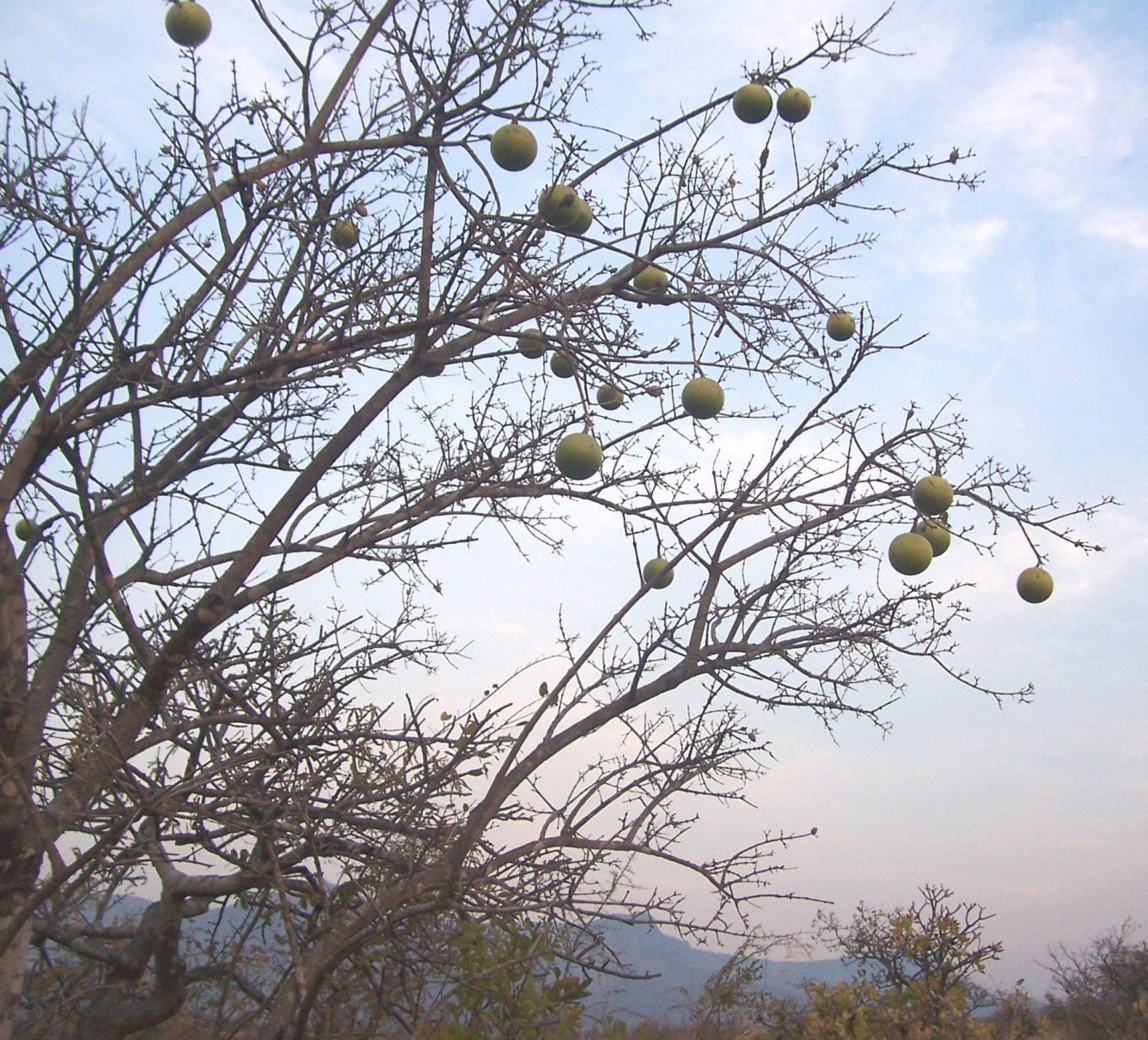
Strychnos spinosa tree in fruit

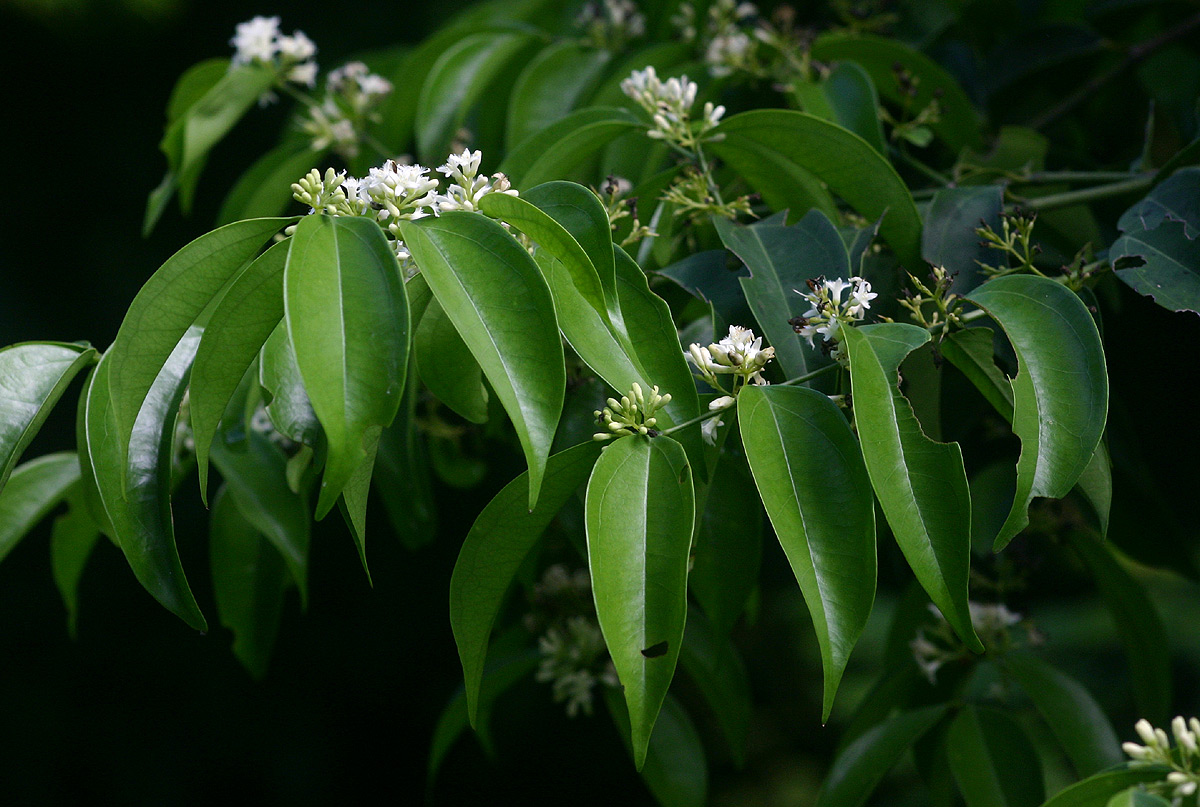
Strychnos usambarensis in flower

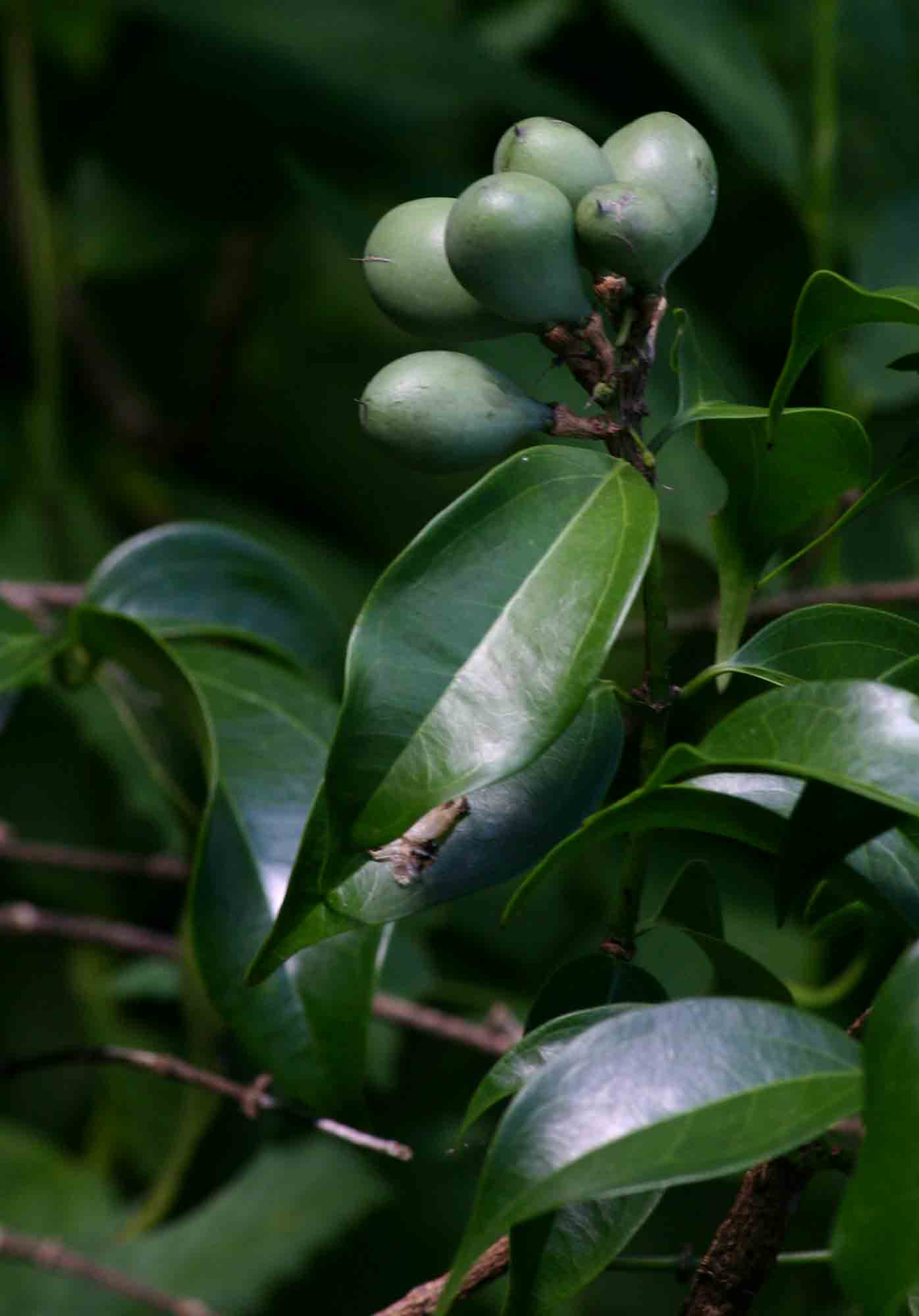
Strychnos usambarensis in fruit

== See also ==
- List of Southern African indigenous trees and woody lianes
