= Monkey orange =

Common name of various fruits

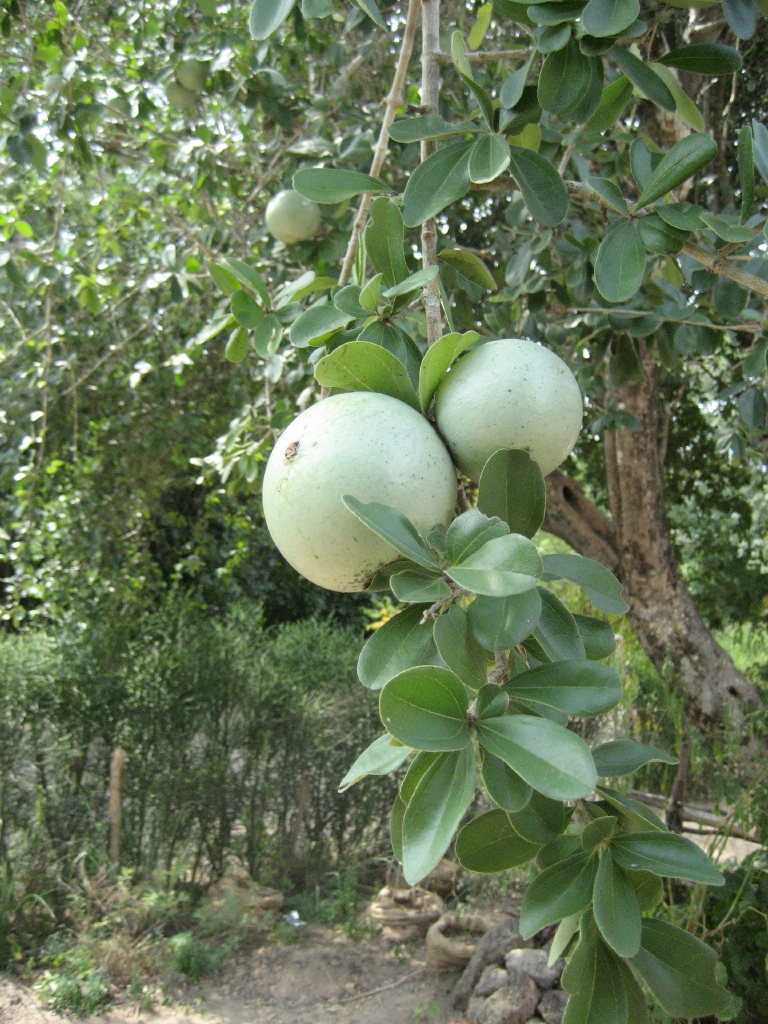
Strychnos madagascariensis, a monkey orange native to Africa

Monkey orange is a common name for several trees that produce fruits that are superficially (but not taxonomically) similar to orange (citrus).

- Strychnos spinosa (also known as green monkey orange, Natal orange, spiny monkey orange)
- Strychnos madagascariensis (also known as black monkey orange)
- Strychnos cocculoides (also known as corky-bark monkey orange, Ntonga)
- Strychnos pungens (spiny-leaf monkey orange)
- Maclura pomifera (also known as Osage orange)
