= Strychnos chromatoxylon =

Conservation status
- Data Deficient (IUCN 2.3)

Scientific classification
- Kingdom: Plantae
- Clade: Tracheophytes
- Clade: Angiosperms
- Clade: Eudicots
- Clade: Asterids
- Order: Gentianales
- Family: Loganiaceae
- Genus: Strychnos
- Species: S. chromatoxylon

Binomial name
- Strychnos chromatoxylon Leeuwenb.

Species of plant

Strychnos chromatoxylon is a species of plant in the Loganiaceae family. It is found in Cameroon, Central African Republic, and Ivory Coast.
