= Strychnos nux-blanda =

Scientific classification
- Kingdom: Plantae
- Clade: Embryophytes
- Clade: Tracheophytes
- Clade: Spermatophytes
- Clade: Angiosperms
- Clade: Eudicots
- Clade: Asterids
- Order: Gentianales
- Family: Loganiaceae
- Genus: Strychnos
- Species: S. nux-blanda

Binomial name
- Strychnos nux-blanda A.W.Hill

Species of shrub or small tree

Strychnos nux-blanda is a shrub or small tree in the Loganiaceae family. It is native to Southeast Asia and Assam. The wood is used as fuel; seeds are toxic, but used in folk-medicine. It is one of the plants featured in the garden of King Narai (1633–1688) at Lopburi, Thailand.

== Description ==
This species grows as a deciduous shrub or small tree, some 4–15 m (13–49 ft) tall. Leaves are broadly ovate, elliptic or suborbicular; some 9–22 × 7–16 cm in size, papery, smooth with a round base, acute to acuminate apex and 5–7 basal veins. The axillary thyrses are 4–6 cm in size. There are puberulent bracteoles. Flowers are present in fives, with a puberulent pedicel. Calyx has narrow oblong lobes some 3 mm in size, outside glandular. White corolla are salverform, some 1–2 cm long, the tube is around 9 mm, the outside is villous near the base, narrowly elliptic lobes some 3 mm, with there outside glandular. The stamens are inserted at the corolla mouth, with very short filament, the anthers are subovate, around 2 mm long with an exserted apex. The ovary is ovoid and smooth. Smooth style is up to 1.2 cm long. The stigma are capitate. The fruit, berries, are globose, 6–8 cm in diameter and have 4–15 seeds. Seeds are ovoid to suborbicular to ellipsoid in shape, some 1.5–2.2 by 1.3–2 cm in size, plano-compressed. In China the flowers appear from March to June with fruiting is from August to December.

Traits that distinguish it from other Strycnos species include: the narrowly oblong sepals which are subglabrous; the fruit is 6–8 cm in diameter.

The wood of the species has the unusual anatomical trait (in wood generally and Loganiaceae in particular) of having perforations in the ray cells.

The wood measured higher than average density, 0.88 g/cm^{3} (average: 0.64 g/cm^{3}), and lower than average water content, 0.344 g/cm^{3} (average: 0.42 g/cm^{3}), amongst the tree taxa of a dry deciduous forest in Cambodia.

== Distribution ==
The species is native to Southeast Asia and Assam. Countries and regions where it grows include: Thailand, Cambodia, Vietnam, Laos, Myanmar, and India (Assam).

The species is cultivated in south and southwest Guangdong, Zhōngguó/China.

== Habitat, ecology ==
The plant grows in subcanopy, in open forest, usually at some distance from other specimens, often in gritty soil. It grows in Guangdong at between 300 and 600 m (980 and 1,970 ft) elevation.

In the deciduous dipterocarp forest of Somdej Ya Learning Community Demonstration School (Mae Chaem District, Chiang Mai Province, Thailand), the species is of low frequency in a community dominated by Dipterocarpus tuberculatus, Shorea obtusa and Gluta usitata.

In Xonboury District (Savannakhet Province, southern Laos), there is a sanctuary for the endangered Eld's deer. This tree grows both below the canopy and as canopy in the open dipterocarp forest, evergreen forest and agricultural vegetation communities. The open dipterocarp forest with grassy understory is a crucial habitat for the deer, these forests are dominated by Dipterocarpus tuberculatus, Dipterocarpus obtusifolius, Shorea obtusa, and Shorea siamensis.

Sap oozing from the fruit of this species is eaten by the fruit fly Bactrocera flavoverticalis. Male tephritid fruit flies display aggressive behaviour when maintaining a territory, during courtship or occasionally when protecting temporarily a feeding site. During daylight both males and females of the above species feed on this fruit peacefully, however at dusk the males start to fight and court females.

== Vernacular names ==
- tuum kaa khaao (Thai)
- ตูมกา, mino (Late 17th century, Thailand)
- tumka (Isan language, Thailand)
- pul vir-prâvêk (Khmer)
- rovak (Mnong, Cambodia).
- kompolvek (Kuy and/or Khmer speakers in north-central Cambodia)
- mai toum ka (Laos)
- 山马钱, shan ma qian (Standard Chinese)

== Uses ==
The wood furnishes firewood. The fruit is toxic, in the indigenous medicine of Cambodia the seeds are often sold in a mixture with the seeds of Strychnos nux-vomica to be used as an emetic. Warning: taking these seeds is often fatal, and their effective use as an emetic is not verified by science. The plant is also used for folk medicine in Thailand.

Use of the trunk bark is described by the chief herbalist of Khao Kho District (Phetchabun Province, northern Thailand) to treat liver cancer, in a mixture with Enydra fluctuans and Myxopyrum smilacifolium ssp. confertum.

There are palm-leaf manuscripts written by Isan people (Sakon Nakhon Province, northeastern Thailand) in the recent-past. One describes a treatment for abscesses using the bark stem of this species (in a mixture with Alpinia galanga, Momordica cochinchinensis and Mimosa pudica).

Amongst Kuy- and Khmer-speaking people living in the same villages in Stung Treng and Preah Vihear Provinces of north-central Cambodia, the tree is used as source of medicine.

The Bunong people of Mondulkiri Province, northeastern Cambodia, gather the bark and wood from wild trees for various folk remedies, to clean wounds, to treat headaches (sometimes mixed with Helicteres angustifolia wood), and for post-natal care.

== History ==
The species was described in 1917 by the noted English botanist and taxonomist Arthur William Hill (1875–1941). He was Director of the Royal Botanic Gardens, Kew from 1922 to 1941. The plant was described in the Bulletin of Miscellaneous Information, Royal Gardens, Kew.

The tree is one of the plants mentioned as being in the gardens of King Narai the Great, in the poem Eulogy of King Narai (written shortly after 1680 CE). He was ruler of the Ayutthaya Kingdom in what is now central and southern Thailand. The gardens were adjacent to the palace at Lopburi.
