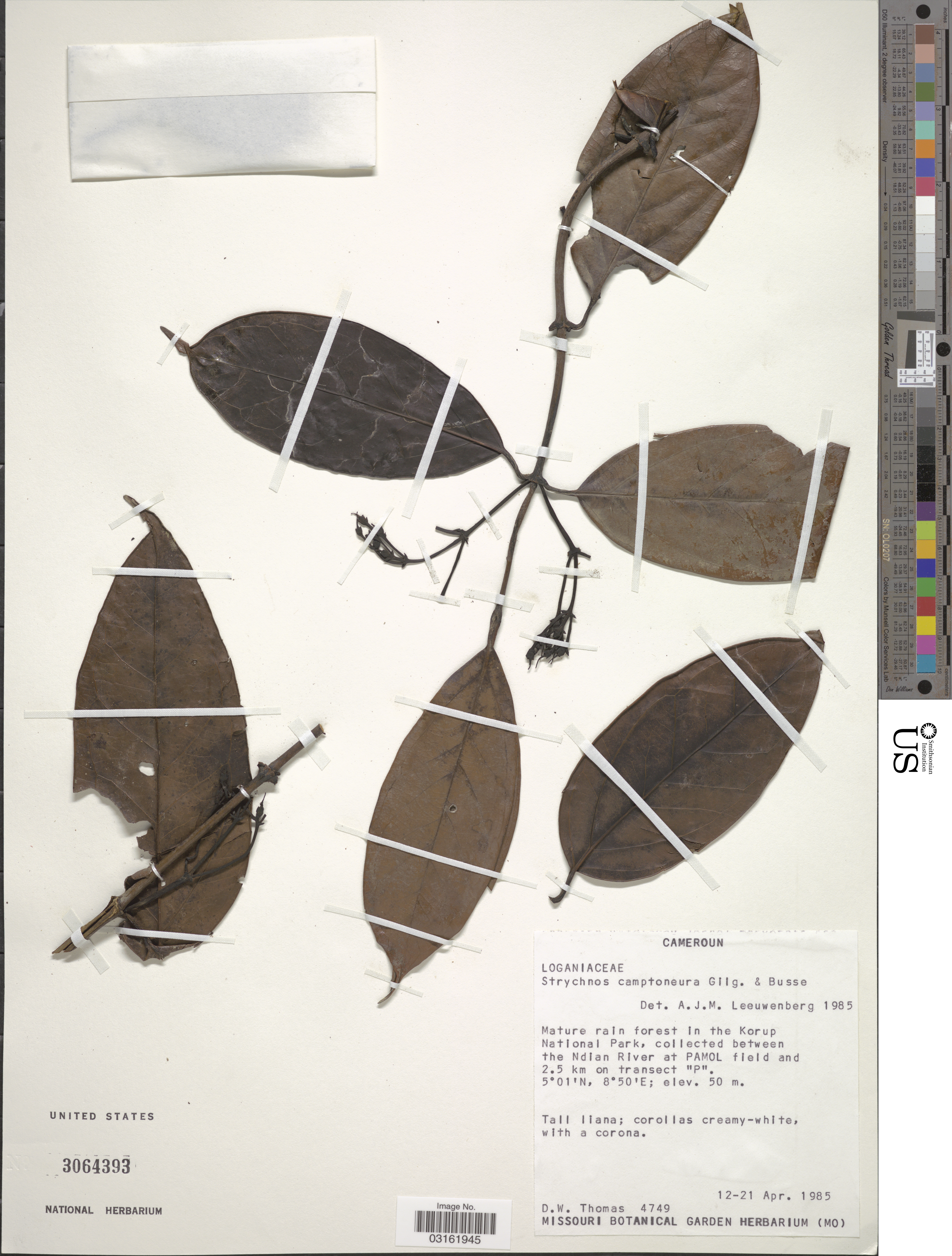

Scientific classification
- Kingdom: Plantae
- Clade: Tracheophytes
- Clade: Angiosperms
- Clade: Eudicots
- Clade: Asterids
- Order: Gentianales
- Family: Loganiaceae
- Genus: Strychnos
- Species: S. camptoneura

Binomial name
- Strychnos camptoneura Gilg & Busse

Synonyms
- Scyphostrychnos psittaconyx P.A.Duvign. Scyphostrychnos talbotii S.Moore

= Strychnos camptoneura =

Species of flowering plant

Strychnos camptoneura is a species of plant in the Loganiaceae family. It is native to Cameroon, the Central African Republic, the Democratic Republic of the Congo, Gabon, Ivory Coast, Liberia, Nigeria, the Republic of the Congo and Zaire.

== Description ==
It is a woody climbing plant reaching 45 meters in height but totaling up to 120 meters in length and 2-25 centimeters in diameter. Its bark is dark brown with large lenticels. Its hard wood is yellow to orange-brown. Its branches are small, hairless, and lack lenticels. Its tendrils occur in groups of 1-3 pairs. Its hairless petioles are 7-17 millimeters long. Its hairless, slightly leathery to leathery, elliptical to oval leaves are 6-31 X 3-12 centimeters with pointed to tapering tips and wedge-shaped or rounded bases. The upper surface of the leaves are shiny. The basal pair of secondary veins in the leaf are larger than the others. Its inflorescences have 5 flowers in axillary, or sometimes terminal positions. The flowers are on hairless, green pedicels attached to hairless, green peduncles. Its pale green, rounded, hairless sepals are, 2–3.5 millimeters long and fused at their base. Its white to yellow corollas are 5-lobed. The triangular to oval lobes are 4-6 by 1.7-3 millimeters with pointed tips. The base of the corollas are 4-6 millimeter long tubes. The outer surfaces of the corollas are hairless and the inner surfaces have fine hairs at their tips. Its stamen are attached at the throat of the corolla and have hairless filaments and narrow, oblong anthers that are 2.2-3 by 0.6-0.7 millimeters. Its hairless carpels are 8-9 millimeters long. Its oval ovaries are 3-4 x 2-2.5 millimeters with two compartments. Each compartment has more than 50 ovules. Its hard, elliptical to oval, yellow fruit are 6.5-20 by 6-13.5 centimeters with pointed or rounded tips. The fruit have two compartments each containing orange pulp and 2-112 seeds. The hairless flattened, convex, oval to oblong seeds are 25-50 by 20-40 by 3-6 millimeters. The seeds have irregularly shaped wings that are 1-6 millimeter wide.

== Habitat and distribution ==
It has been observed growing in rain forests at elevations of 0 to 700 meters.
