= Strychnos mellodora =

Conservation status
- Least Concern (IUCN 3.1)

Scientific classification
- Kingdom: Plantae
- Clade: Tracheophytes
- Clade: Angiosperms
- Clade: Eudicots
- Clade: Asterids
- Order: Gentianales
- Family: Loganiaceae
- Genus: Strychnos
- Species: S. mellodora

Binomial name
- Strychnos mellodora S. Moore

Species of plant

Strychnos mellodora is a species of plant in the Loganiaceae family. It is found in Kenya, Mozambique, Tanzania, and Zimbabwe.
