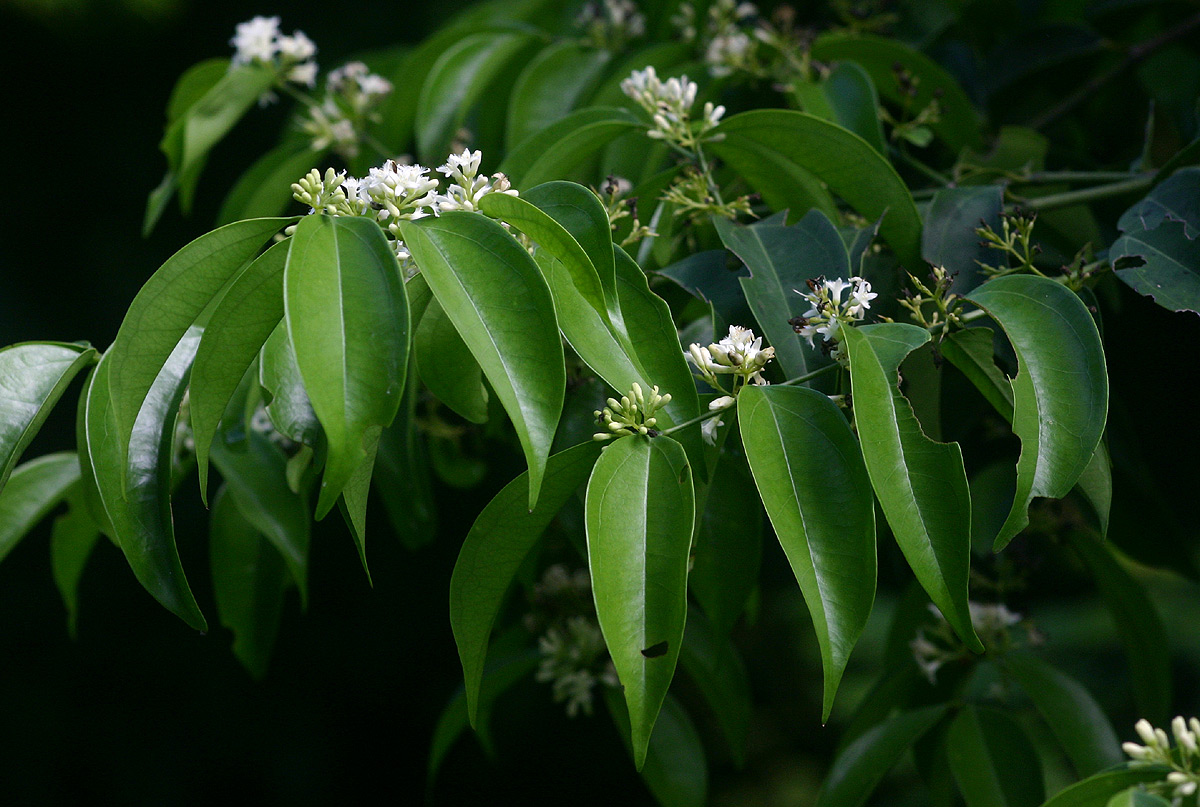

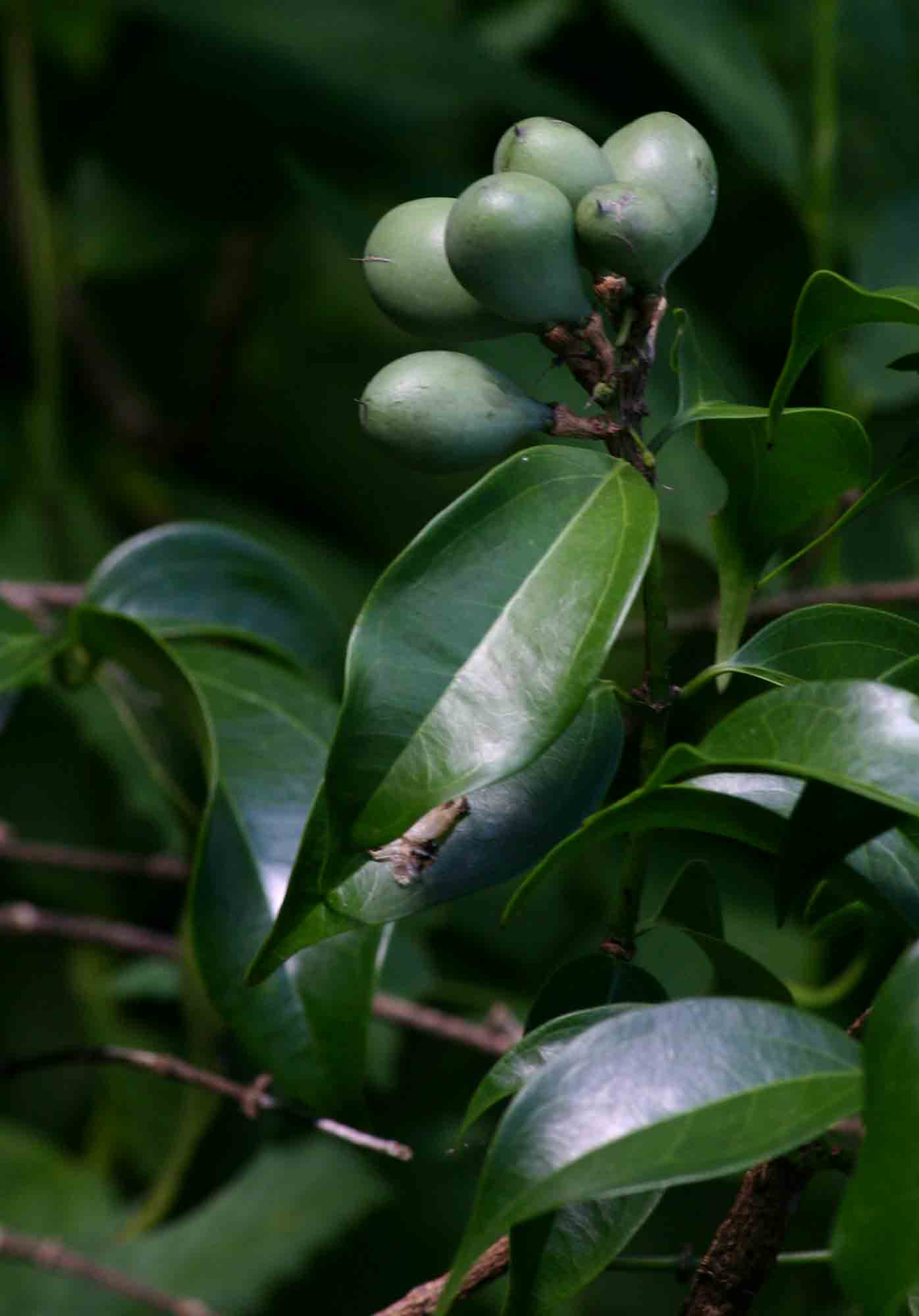

Scientific classification
- Kingdom: Plantae
- Clade: Embryophytes
- Clade: Tracheophytes
- Clade: Angiosperms
- Clade: Eudicots
- Clade: Asterids
- Order: Gentianales
- Family: Loganiaceae
- Genus: Strychnos
- Species: S. usambarensis

Binomial name
- Strychnos usambarensis Gilg ex Engl.

Synonyms
- Strychnos cerasifera Gilg; Strychnos cooperi Hutch. & M.B.Moss; Strychnos distichophylla Gilg; Strychnos micans S.Moore

= Strychnos usambarensis =

Species of shrub

Strychnos usambarensis is a shrub or small tree up to 15m tall or a 70m long liane of Sub-Saharan Africa, occurring in forest and woodland, mountain ravines and coastal bush, often on rocky slopes and named for the Usambara Mountains of Tanzania. The species is found from Guinea east to Nigeria, from Congo east to Kenya and south to kloofs of the Magaliesberg of South Africa. Bantu tribes from Rwanda and Tanzania produce an arrow poison from the root bark and leaves of this species, sometimes combining it with extracts from other plants. (see Toxalbumin)

The leaves are opposite, held in a horizontal plane, ovate to elliptic in shape with a characteristic drip tip, and glossy dark green above. Flowers are small, in axillary clusters, whitish to yellowish-green, and fragrant. Fruits are soft-shelled and small, 1-1.5 cm in diameter, yellow when ripe, tapering to a collar at peduncle.

The genus Strychnos is represented by some 300 species of lianes, shrubs and small trees, fairly evenly divided among Asia, America, and Africa.

== Chemical composition ==
Strychnos usambarensis has been thoroughly investigated for potential pharmacological drugs and some 60 indole alkaloids have been isolated, mostly dimeric terpenoid in structure. Root bark holds tertiary alkaloids and several quaternary alkaloids and some anhydronium bases. Among these are the retuline class alkaloids C-dihydrotoxiferine, C-curarine and C-calebassine and the monomeric C-fluorocurarine, which are also the active principles of calabash curare obtained from South American Strychnos spp. The use of curare alkaloids reduces the risks of anaesthesia, as smaller amounts of anaesthetic are needed to achieve the same effect. S. usambarensis root bark also holds the less active afrocurarine, the monomeric tetracyclic alkaloid akagerine, the non-terpenoid alkaloids harmane and melinonine F and the monoquaternary alkaloids malindine and Isomalindine, which belong to the group of trinitrogenated alkaloids. Four root alkaloids, the dimeric usambarensines, are of the corynanthine class. Several of the alkaloids in S. usambarensis have promising anticancer or antimalarial properties, justifying further research.
