= Strychnos tetragona =

Conservation status
- Critically Endangered (IUCN 2.3)

Scientific classification
- Kingdom: Plantae
- Clade: Tracheophytes
- Clade: Angiosperms
- Clade: Eudicots
- Clade: Asterids
- Order: Gentianales
- Family: Loganiaceae
- Genus: Strychnos
- Species: S. tetragona

Binomial name
- Strychnos tetragona A.W.Hill

Species of plant

Strychnos tetragona is a species of plant in the Loganiaceae family. It is endemic to Sri Lanka.
