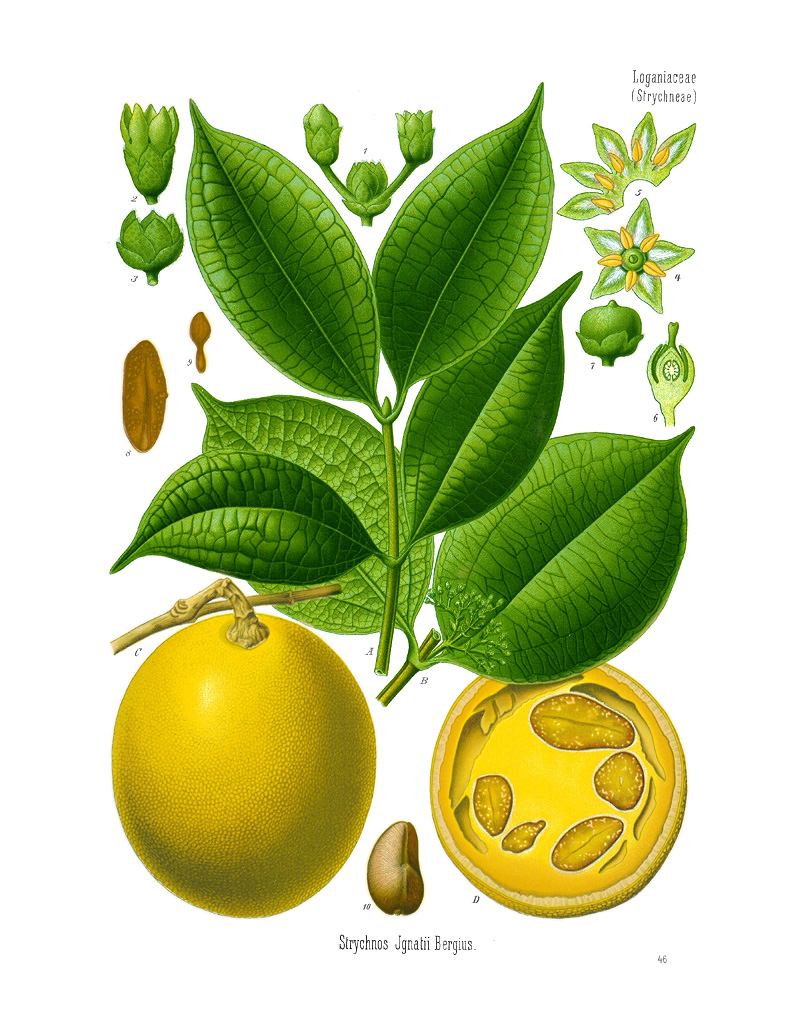

Scientific classification
- Kingdom: Plantae
- Clade: Embryophytes
- Clade: Tracheophytes
- Clade: Spermatophytes
- Clade: Angiosperms
- Clade: Eudicots
- Clade: Asterids
- Order: Gentianales
- Family: Loganiaceae
- Genus: Strychnos
- Species: S. ignatii

Binomial name
- Strychnos ignatii P.J.Bergius

Synonyms
- Ignatia amara Linné filius; Ignatiana philippinica Loureiro; Strychnos hainanensis Merrill & Chun; Strychnos ignatii Bergius; Strychnos ovalifolia Wallich ex G. Don; Strychnos philippensis Blanco

= Strychnos ignatii =

Species of tree

Strychnos ignatii is a tree in the family Loganiaceae, native to the Philippines, particularly in Catbalogan and parts of China. The plant was first described by the Moravian (Czech) Jesuit working in the Philippines, brother Georg Kamel who named its seeds "the beans of St. Ignatius", in honour of the founder of his religious order.

== Etymology ==
The plants was originally named by Kamel for Saint Ignatius of Loyola, the founder of Kamel's Jesuit missionary order. It is known in the Philippines under the names of: aguwason, dankkagi (Visayan language) or igasud (in Cebuano language).

== Fruit ==
The fruit of S. ignatii is the size and shape of a pear, and has almond-like seeds known as Saint Ignatius' beans.

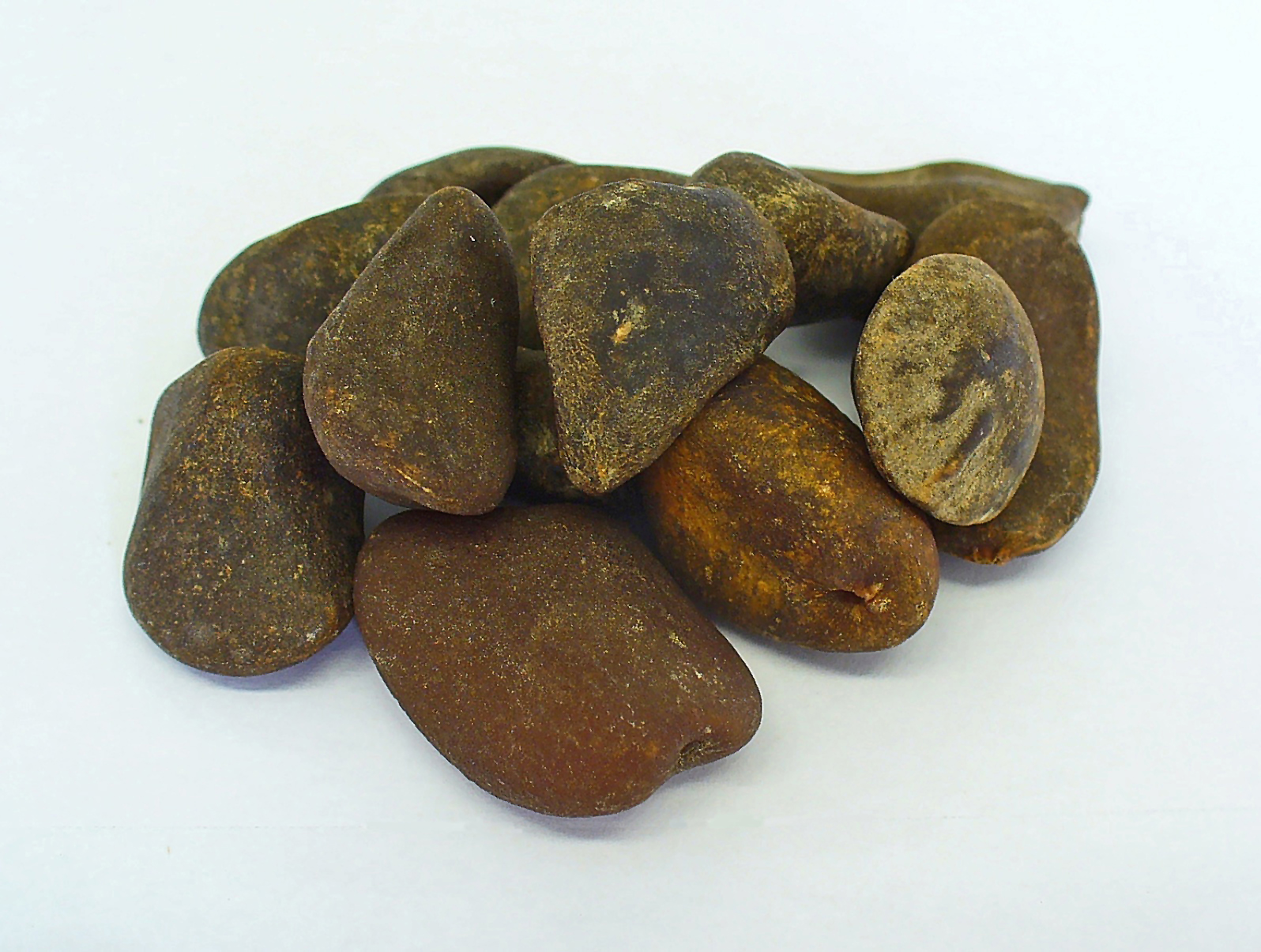
The seeds or "beans" of Strychnos ignatii

== Strychnine ==
The beans of the plant contain the alkaloids strychnine and brucine.
