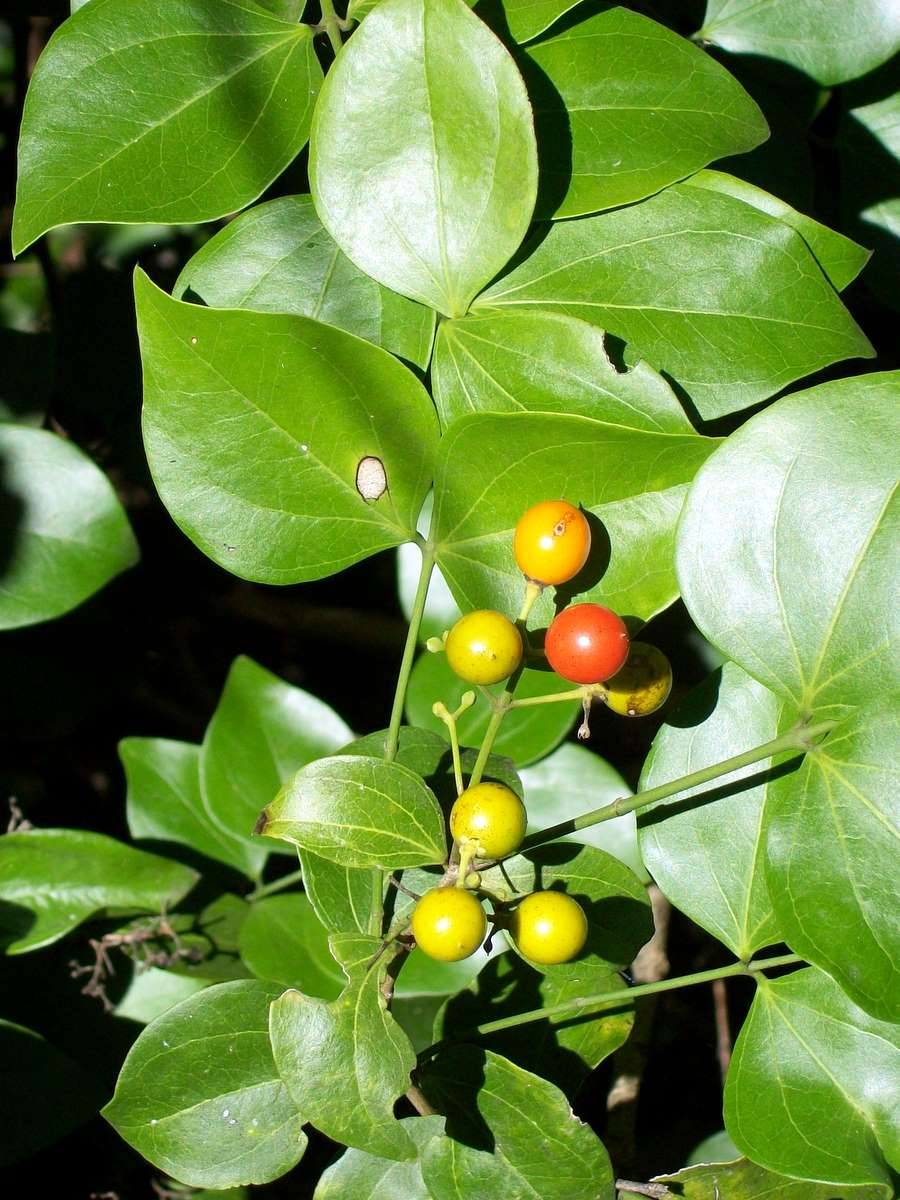

Scientific classification
- Kingdom: Plantae
- Clade: Tracheophytes
- Clade: Angiosperms
- Clade: Eudicots
- Clade: Asterids
- Order: Gentianales
- Family: Loganiaceae
- Genus: Strychnos
- Species: S. psilosperma

Binomial name
- Strychnos psilosperma F.Muell.

Synonyms
- Strychnos axillaris Colebr.; Strychnos arborea A.W.Hill.

= Strychnos psilosperma =

Strychnine tree

Species of plant

Strychnos psilosperma, known as the strychnine tree or threaded boxwood, is a shrub or small tree endemic to New South Wales and Queensland in Australia. It may reach a height of 18 metres.

It occurs as far south as the Clarence River, New South Wales to Cape York at the northernmost tip of Australia.

The bark is grey, with glossy pointed leaves creating a thick canopy. Small white, scented flowers occur in the warmer months. Fruit are orange to red berries, ripening to black. All parts of this plant are toxic. It may be grown in full sun with good drainage.

The habitat is semi-evergreen deciduous vine forest, or mixed eucalyptus forest. A common associate tree is the hoop pine.
