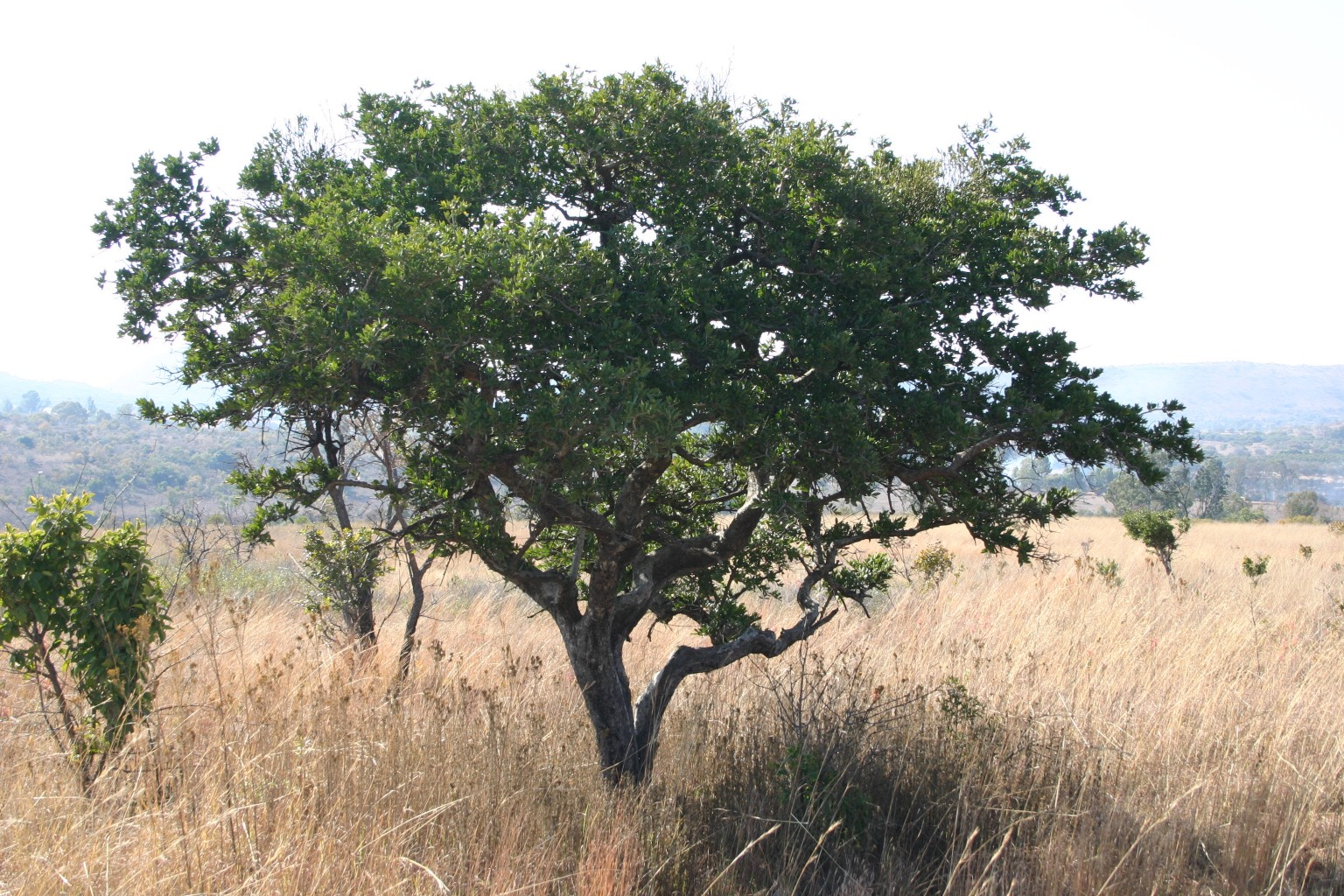

Conservation status
- Least Concern (IUCN 3.1)

Scientific classification
- Kingdom: Plantae
- Clade: Tracheophytes
- Clade: Angiosperms
- Clade: Eudicots
- Clade: Asterids
- Order: Gentianales
- Family: Loganiaceae
- Genus: Strychnos
- Species: S. pungens

Binomial name
- Strychnos pungens Soler.

= Strychnos pungens =

Species of plant

Strychnos pungens (English: spine-leaved monkey-orange, Afrikaans: Stekelblaarklapper) is a tree which belongs to the Loganiaceae. Usually about 5 m (16 ft) tall, occurring in mixed woodland or in rocky places. Branches are short and rigid. Leaves are smooth, stiff, opposite, elliptic and with a sharp, spine-like tip. Occurring in South Africa on the Witwatersrand, Magaliesberg and further north to northern Namibia, northern Botswana and Zimbabwe.

The fruit is large (120 mm (4.7 in) diameter), round and with a smooth hard shell, bluish-green in colour and turning yellow when ripe. The pulp of ripe fruit is rich in citric acid and is edible, but the seeds are mildly poisonous. The tree is a close relative of Strychnos nux-vomica, the source of strychnine.

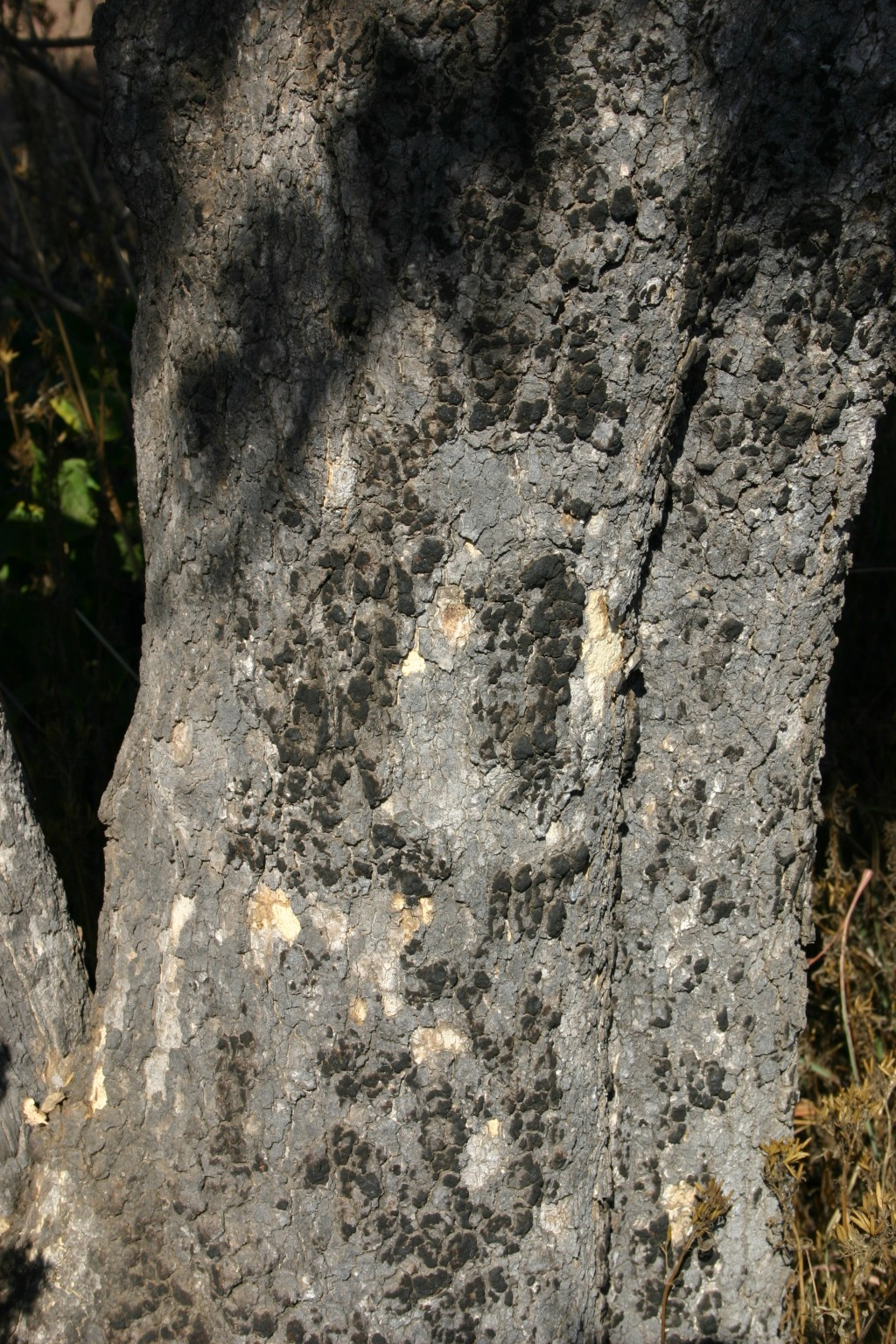
bark

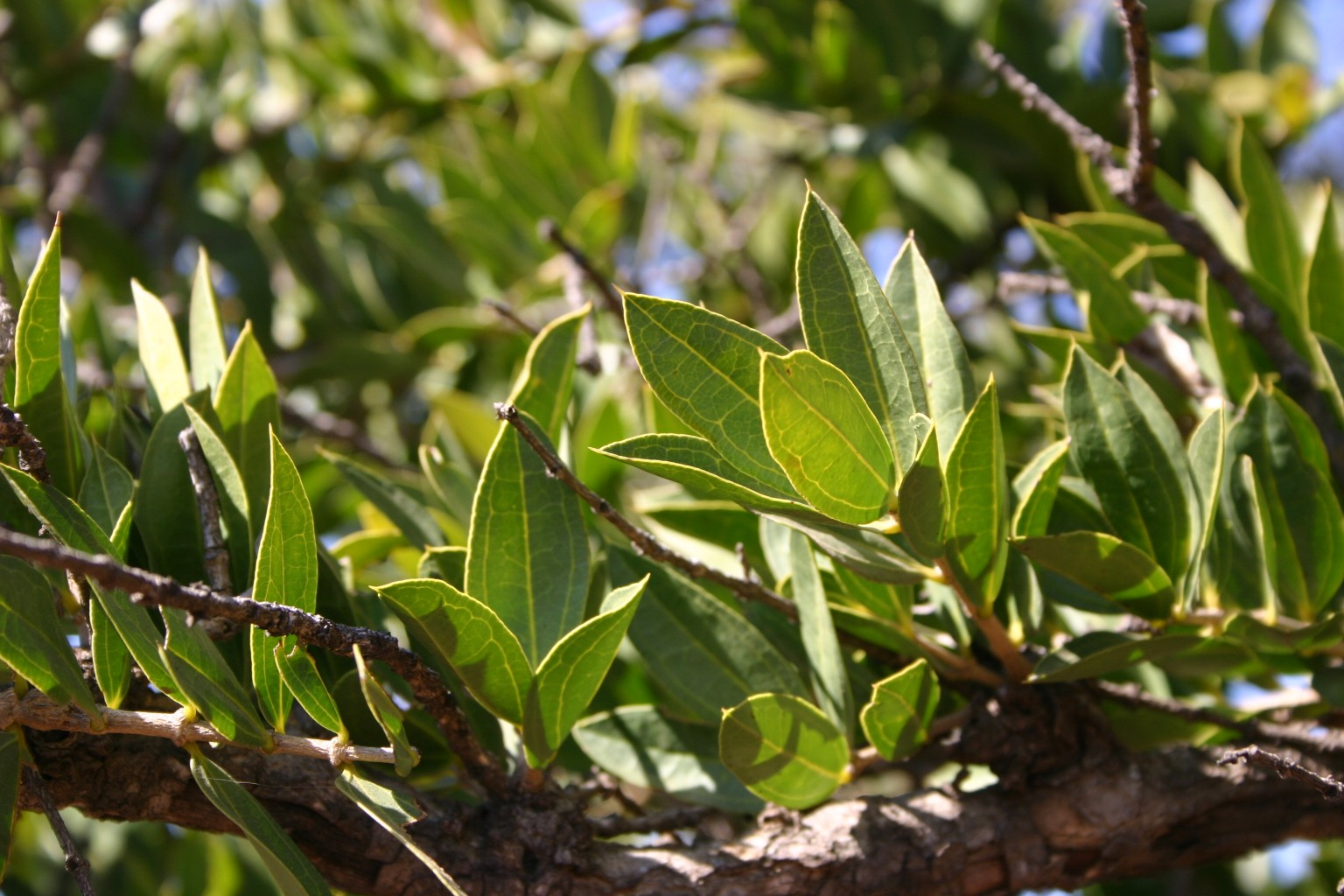
foliage

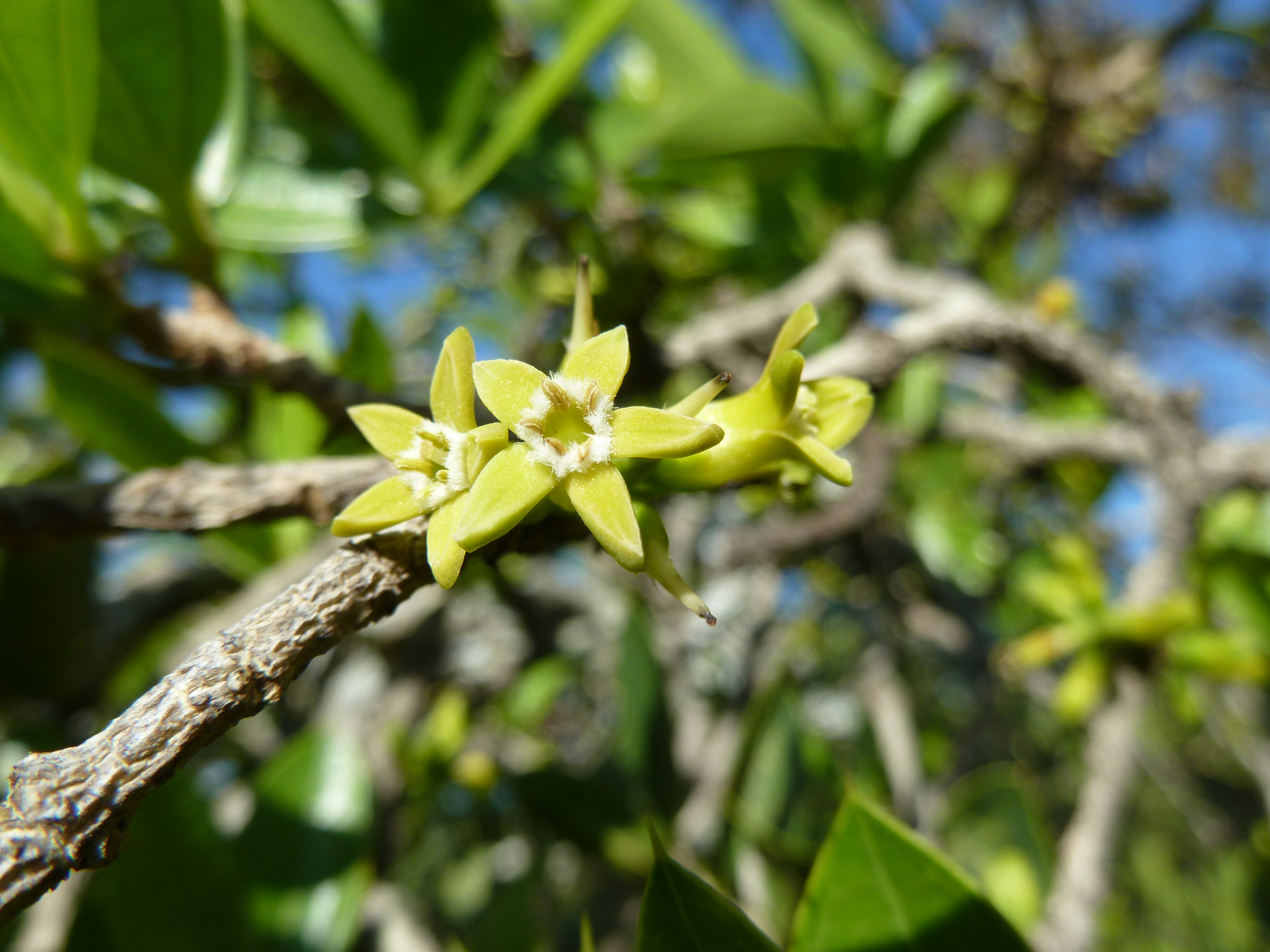
flowers

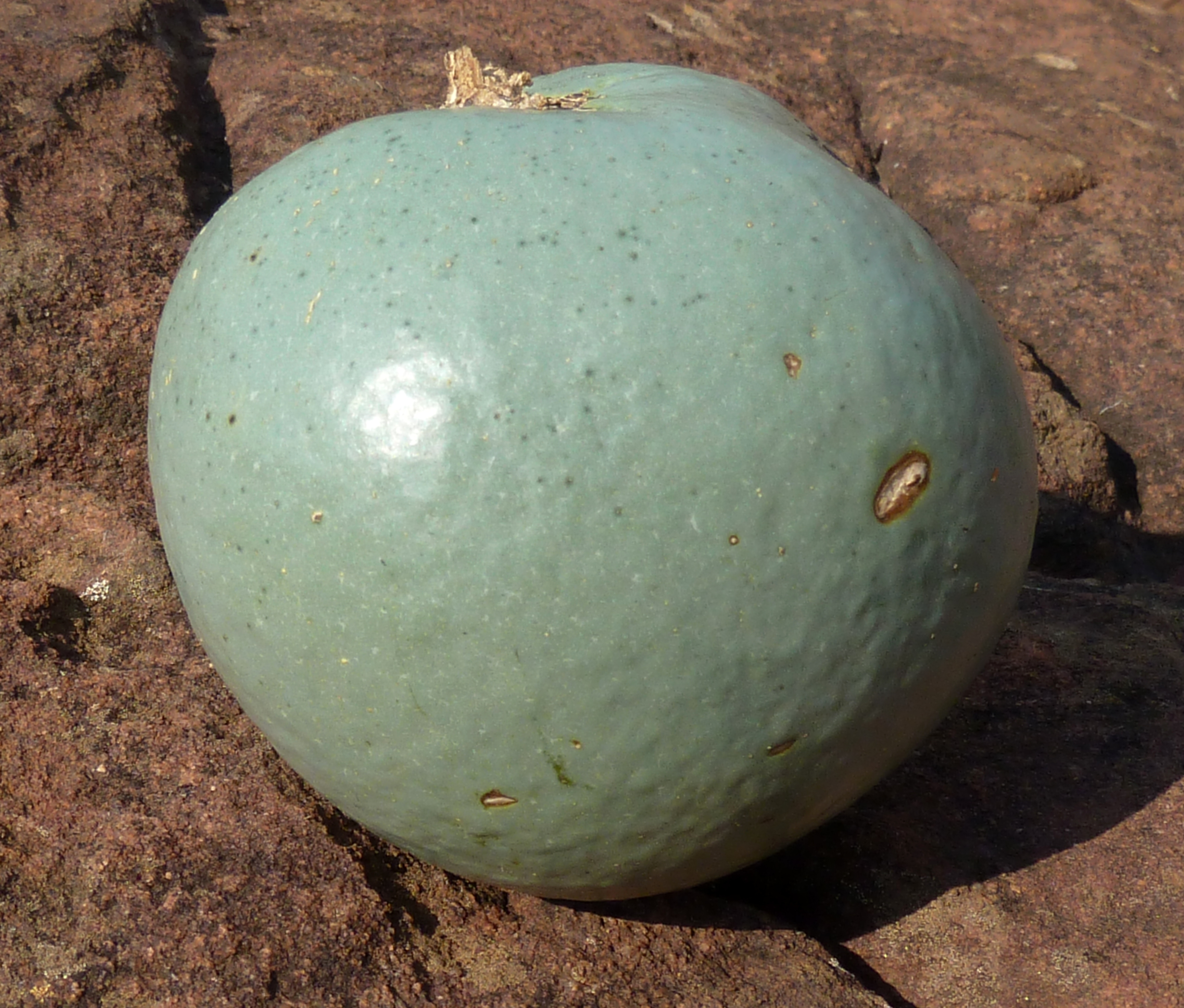
fruit
