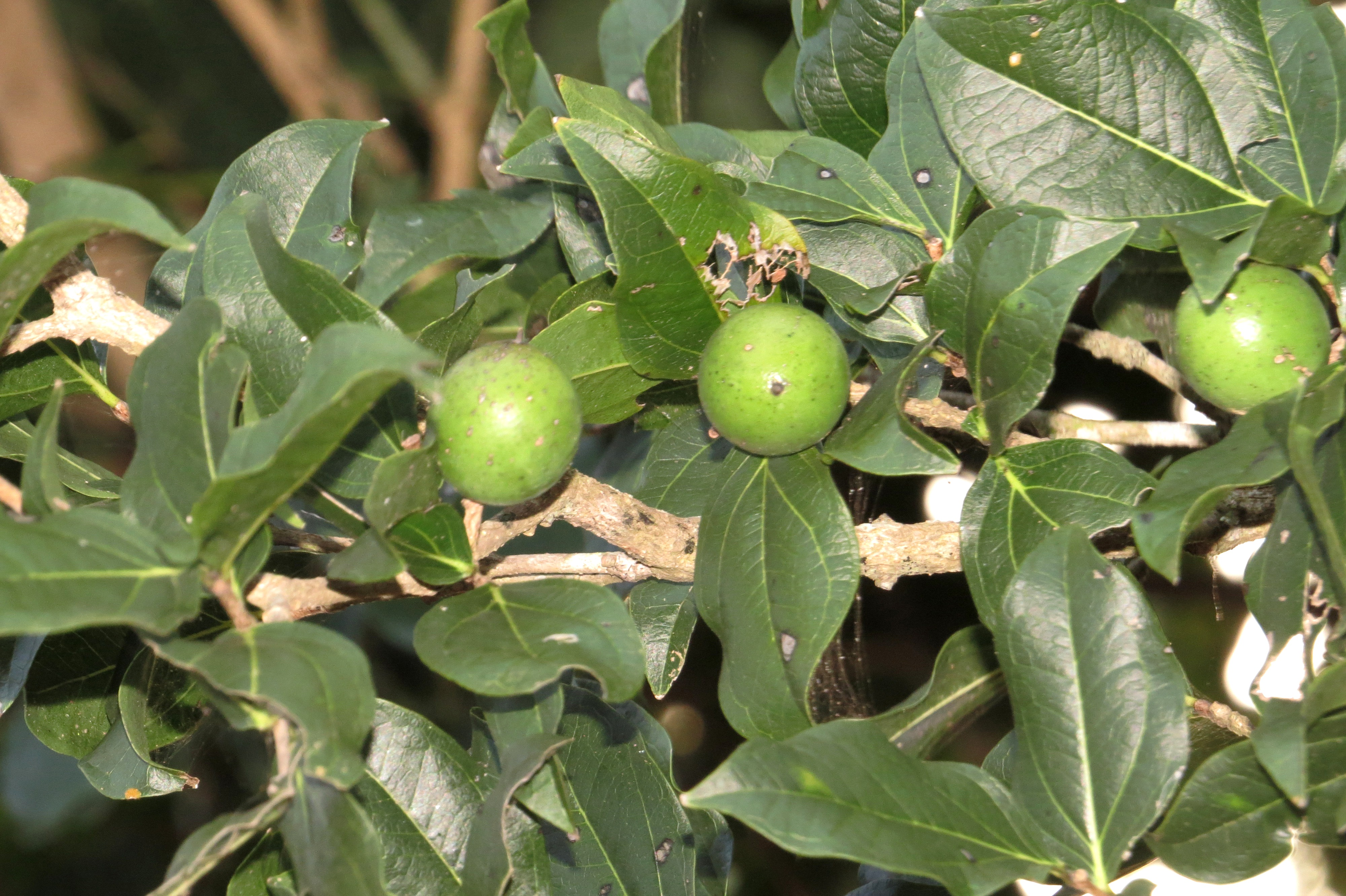

Scientific classification
- Kingdom: Plantae
- Clade: Tracheophytes
- Clade: Angiosperms
- Clade: Eudicots
- Clade: Asterids
- Order: Gentianales
- Family: Loganiaceae
- Genus: Strychnos
- Species: S. potatorum

Binomial name
- Strychnos potatorum L.f.

Synonyms
- Strychnos heterodoxa Gilg; Strychnos stuhlmannii Gilg

= Strychnos potatorum =

Species of plant

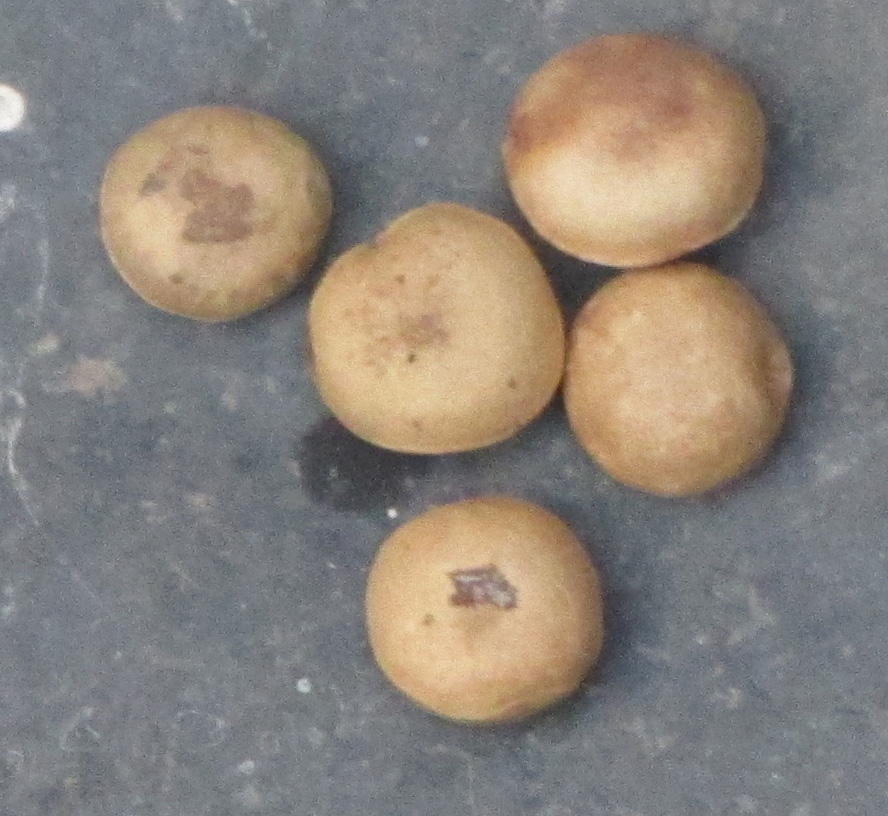
The nuts used for cleaning

Strychnos potatorum also known as clearing-nut tree (Telugu: చిల్లగింజ, Kannada: kataka/ಕತಕ, Tamil: தேத்தான் கொட்டை(Thethankottai), Bengali: কতকা Hindi: Nirmali Burmese: ခပေါင်းရေကြည်, Sinhala ඉඟිනි) is a deciduous tree which has height up to 40 feet (12 meters). The seeds of the tree are commonly used in traditional medicine as well as for purifying water in India and Myanmar.
