= Strychnos elaeocarpa =

Conservation status
- Vulnerable (IUCN 3.1)

Scientific classification
- Kingdom: Plantae
- Clade: Tracheophytes
- Clade: Angiosperms
- Clade: Eudicots
- Clade: Asterids
- Order: Gentianales
- Family: Loganiaceae
- Genus: Strychnos
- Species: S. elaeocarpa

Binomial name
- Strychnos elaeocarpa Gilg ex Leeuwenberg

Species of plant

Strychnos elaeocarpa is a species of plant in the Loganiaceae family. It is endemic to Cameroon. Its natural habitat is subtropical or tropical moist lowland forests. It is threatened by habitat loss.
