= Strychnos millepunctata =

Conservation status
- Vulnerable (IUCN 2.3)

Scientific classification
- Kingdom: Plantae
- Clade: Tracheophytes
- Clade: Angiosperms
- Clade: Eudicots
- Clade: Asterids
- Order: Gentianales
- Family: Loganiaceae
- Genus: Strychnos
- Species: S. millepunctata

Binomial name
- Strychnos millepunctata Leeuwenb.

Species of plant

Strychnos millepunctata is a species of shrub or small tree in the Loganiaceae family. It is endemic to Côte d'Ivoire and grows in the lowland Eastern Guinean forests where it is threatened by habitat loss. S. millepunctata has been investigated for pharmacological properties of its alkaloids.
