= Hans Solereder =

German botanist (1860–1920)

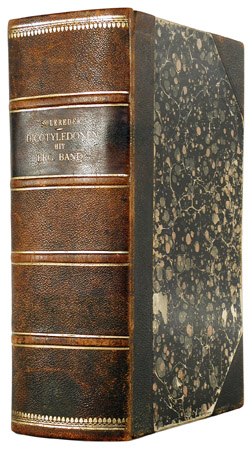

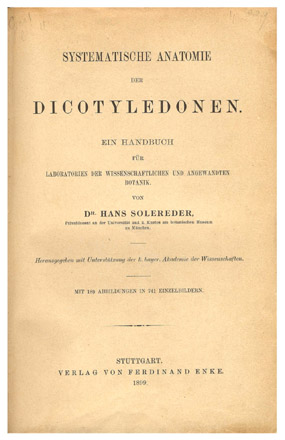

Hans Solereder (11 September 1860, Munich – 8 November 1920, Erlangen), was a German botanist and university professor.

Solereder studied biology from 1880 at the Ludwig-Maximilians-Universität München, under Radlkofer, and was awarded a PhD in 1885. From 1886 to 1890, he was Assistant, and from 1888 tutor in the botany department's laboratory. In 1890, he became curator of the Botanical Museum in Munich. In 1899, he became associate professor and in 1901 Professor of Botany at the University of Erlangen, where he was also Director of the Botanical Gardens.

Solereder undertook field trips to Texas, California and the Yellowstone National Park. He edited the Dicotyledons according to the system devised by Radlkofer.

This botanist is denoted by the author abbreviation Soler. when citing a botanical name.

== Books ==
- (1908): Systematische Anatomie der Dicotyledonen: Ein Handbuch für Laboratorien der wissenschaftlichen und angewandten Botanik - Stuttgart : Enke
- (1885): Über den systematischen Wert der Holzstructur bei den Dicotyledonen. (Dissertation)

== See also ==
- List of florilegia and botanical codices
