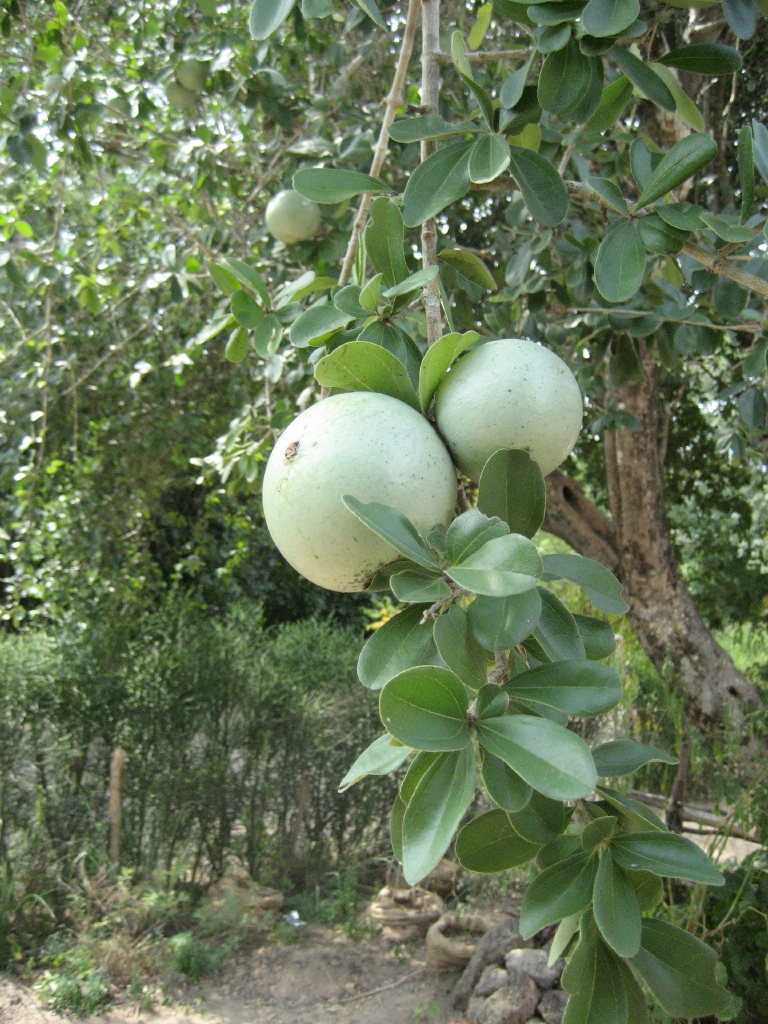

Scientific classification
- Kingdom: Plantae
- Clade: Tracheophytes
- Clade: Angiosperms
- Clade: Eudicots
- Clade: Asterids
- Order: Gentianales
- Family: Loganiaceae
- Genus: Strychnos
- Species: S. madagascariensis

Binomial name
- Strychnos madagascariensis Poir.

= Strychnos madagascariensis =

Black monkey orange

Species of tree

Strychnos madagascariensis, the black monkey orange, is an African tropical and sub-tropical tree belonging to the Loganiaceae family. It is a tree with characteristically large fruit but can confused with some other species of the genus.

== Vernacular names ==
It is also known by various other English names. Among southern African languages it is known (among others) as Mogorwagorwane or Lerutla (Setswana), Umkwakwa (North Ndebele), Morapa or Mookwane (Sepedi), Muhwakwa (Shona), umKhwakhwa (Swati), Nkwakwa or Muquaqua (Tsonga), or Mukwakwa (Venda). In West Africa it is known as Nkankoronin (Bambara).

== Range ==
It is native to KwaZulu-Natal, Mozambique, Transvaal, and further north to Zimbabwe, Botswana, Malawi, Zambia, Tanzania, Tropical Africa and the western side of Madagascar.

== Description ==
Usually about 6 m (20 ft) tall and often multi-stemmed with a spreading, irregular crown, it occurs in open woodland, rocky places, riverine fringes and coastal forest. Bark mostly pale grey with white and dark grey patches, smooth, occasionally powdery. Branches are unarmed though short, rigid lateral shoots may resemble spines. The opposite leaves - often tufted - are smooth to hairy, leathery, elliptic to circular, shiny dark green above and markedly paler below.

Flowers are small and greenish-yellow in clusters of 1-4 flowers. Fruit is near-spherical with a thick, woody shell, about 8 cm (3.1 in) in diameter and distinctively blue-green in colour when young, turning yellow when mature. The tightly-packed poisonous seeds are covered in an orange, fleshy, edible pulp rich in citric acid and iridoids - the pulp is relished by humans and baboons. Iridoids are primarily a defense against herbivory and pathogens, and are characterized by a bitter taste.

== Uses ==
The tree is a close relative of Strychnos nux-vomica, the seed of which is a source of strychnine. Fishing with poisonous plants used to be a common practice in Africa, and though outlawed is still employed in remote areas. As with other species of Strychnos the seeds are pulverised and thrown into a pool or dammed sections of a stream, affected fish soon rising to the surface, while subsequent cooking breaks down the poison. Oils extracted from the inner skin of the fruit have a high oleic acid content.

== Synonyms ==
- Strychnos baronii Baker
- Strychnos behrensiana Gilg & Busse
- Strychnos burtonii Baker
- Strychnos dysophylla Benth.
- Strychnos dysophylla subsp. engleri (Gilg) E.A. Bruce & Lewis
- Strychnos engleri Gilg
- Strychnos gerrardii N.E. Br.
- Strychnos innocua subsp. burtonii (Baker) E.A. Bruce & J. Lewis
- Strychnos innocua subsp. dysophylla (Benth.) I. Verd.
- Strychnos innocua subsp. gerrardii (N.E. Br.) I. Verd.
- Strychnos leiocarpa Gilg & Busse
- Strychnos melonicarpa Gilg & Busse
- Strychnos mocquerysii Aug. DC.
- Strychnos pachphylla Gilg & Busse
- Strychnos polyphylla Gilg & Busse
- Strychnos quaqua Gilg
- Strychnos randiaeformis Baill.
- Strychnos stenoneura Gilg & Busse
- Strychnos unguacha var. dysophylla (Benth.) Gilg
- Strychnos unguacha var. micrantha Gilg
- Strychnos vacacoua Baill.
- Strychnos wakefieldii Baker
