= Osman Achmatowicz =

Polish chemist (1899–1988)

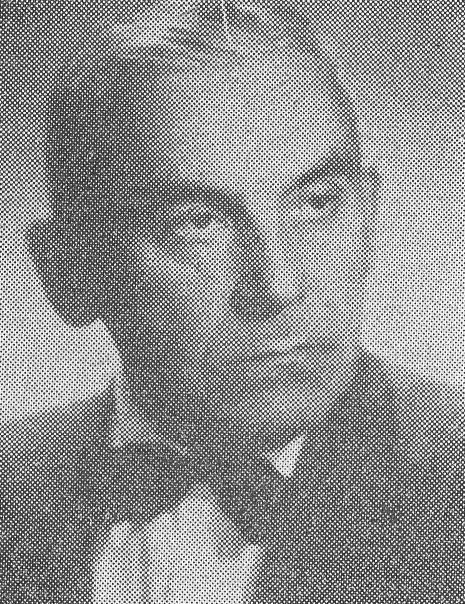
- Achmatowicz in the 1960s
- Born: 16 March 1899; Bergaliszki, Russian Empire
- Died: 4 December 1988 (aged 89); Warsaw, Poland
- Education: Stefan Batory University
- Known for: organophosphorus chemistry
- Scientific career
- Fields: Chemistry
- Workplaces: University of Warsaw; Łódź University of Technology

Osman Achmatowicz (April 16, 1899 – December 4, 1988) was a Polish chemist of Lipka Tatar descent, who studied alkaloid natural products. His son, Osman Achmatowicz Jr., (also a chemist) is credited with the Achmatowicz reaction in 1971.

== Biography ==
Professor Osman Achmatowicz was a Polish Tatar of Islamic confession. The sixth of eight children in the noble family of jurist Alexander Achmatowicz, he was born at the ancestral estate Bergaliszki, near Oszmania, on 16 March 1899.

Educated at the Royal Corps in St. Petersburg (then Petrograd), he was admitted to higher studies at the Mining Institute of Petrograd in 1916. After the Bolshevik uprising interrupted the school's work, he worked temporarily as an apprentice at the Golubowka coal mine in the Donetsk Basin. In 1919, after his arrival in newly-independent Poland, he continued his studies at the resurrected Vilnius University.

In 1924, he received a master of chemistry. For the next three years, he worked under the research supervision of Professor Casimir Slawinski, and graduated in 1928 with a doctorate on the terpenoid bicyclic hydrocarbon bornylene. Following graduation, the National Culture Fund of Poland sponsored him for two years as a post-doctoral fellow at Oxford University's Dyson Perrins Laboratory. There, Achmatowicz worked under the supervision of Professor William Henry Perkin FRS, and, after his death in 1929, Professor Robert Robinson OM FRS FRSE of the University of London. At Oxford, Achmatowicz received a second PhD, on the structures of strychnine and brucine.

Returning to Vilno, Achmatowicz rejoined the university's organic chemistry department, both teaching and continuing to research the strychnos alkaloids. He devised a new reductive-degradation method for allylic quaternary ammonium salts catalyzed by palladium and charcoal. This method became crucial in organic compound analysis and was subsequently modified by other researchers to rupture carbon-oxygen bonds. For these contributions, Achmatowicz received the title of docent in 1933.

The following year (1934), Achmatowicz joined the faculty of pharmacy at the University of Warsaw as professor extraordinaire to the chair of pharmaceutical and toxicological chemistry. With the increased funds and better facilities, Achmatowicz accelerated his publications' cadence. In four years, he (and coworkers) (Note: Dihydrostrychnidine R. Robinson and Cz. Dybowski Dihydrobrucidine P. Lewi and R. Robinson Dihydrovomicidine B. Racinski) had achieved all three stages of Hofman degradation with dihydrostrychnidine, dihydrobrucidine, and dihydrovomicidine. He, with B. Bochwic, verified that catalytic deamination extended to brucine-type compounds as well, and, with K. Lindenfeld, determined the influence of the ethylenic linkage's position on the reaction's ease.

Meanwhile, Achmatowicz began phytochemical research on Polish flora, seeking physiologically active compounds from wild plants used in Polish folk-medicine. His colleagues recommended examining club mosses (Lycopodium clavatum, selago and annotinum) and water lilies (Nuphar lutea and Nymphaea alba), and these proved fruitful. After two years, Achmatowicz, in conjunction with the Polish pharmaceutical industry and Spiess and Son, succeeded in isolating and characterising several novel alkaloids.

In September 1939, the outbreak of World War II halted all research. Bombings destroyed Achmatowicz’s laboratory and research files, and then the Germans closed and disbanded all universities within their sphere of control. During the war, Achmatowicz's investigations on club-moss alkaloids would be continued by Canadian organic chemists in 1942, and later still in Germany. Achmatowicz himself undertook secret underground teaching for student groups in Warsaw and Czestochowa.

When the war finished, Professor B. Stefanowski offered him a rectorship at the new Technical University of Łódź. He would serve in this position until 1952, but needed funds for the chemical faculty's laboratories. Through his connection to Robert Robinson, Achmatowicz requested and received a generous grant from the British Royal Society. General Stanisław Kopański, chief of staff of the Polish Armed Forces, stationed in Great Britain at that time, rendered additional financial aid. By 1948, the faculty had its own premises with relatively modern research facilities.

At his new position, Achmatowicz began investigating the applications of coaltar (2-vinylpyridine) and certain problems in reaction mechanisms. With J. Michalski, he examined organophosphorus chemistry; and with Michalski and E. Maruszewska-Wieczorkowska, he plotted new synthetic routes to sulfones. But a key focus of his research soon become the simple compound carbonyl cyanide. Polish organic chemist R. Malachowski had discovered this compound in 1937, but died in the Warsaw Uprising before he could research its properties.

Achmatowicz's team ultimately needed 15 publications to fully elucidate carbonyl cyanide's properties. With M. Leplawy, Achmatowicz determined that the compound can react with alkenes in two different ways. With alkenes with an allylic hydrogen, it undergoes an ene reaction at the carbonyl before eliminating hydrogen cyanide to give β,γ‑unsaturated ketonitriles. For fully-substituted alkenes, however, the carbonyl adds to the ethylene system to form a substituted oxetane. Similar reactions with alcohols and phenols gave cyanoformates and with ketenes gave dicyanopropionic β‑lactones.

With A. Zamojski, he noticed that carbonyl cyanide could also act as a dienophile. This impetus induced Achmatowicz, Zamojski, and J. Wrobel to study the synthesis of analogous dienes. In a series of papers, they analyzed a number of diene reactions, including with dienophiles dimethylmesoxalate, diethyl azodicarboxylate. In the process, Achmatowicz and his co-workers — F. Werner-Zamojska, K. Belniak, A. Zwiersak, Cz. Borecki, and J. Szychowski — became the first to identify that diethyl azodicarboxylate is also an enophile.

Starting in the 1950s, when his Łódź laboratory was sponsored by the National Culture Fund and the Polish Academy of Sciences, Achmatowicz also resumed his research on Lycopodium and Nuphar alkaloids. However, he was distracted by work, starting 1953, as undersecretary of state in the Ministry of Higher Education. While serving in the capital, he also organized a research team at Warsaw University.

Only after his resignation from the ministry in 1960 could his laboratory apply chromatographic and spectroscopic techniques to the alkaloids. These techniques rapidly produced significant and ground-breaking results:

- With Wl. Rodewald, Achmatowicz identified and purified 17 different alkaloids from Lycopodium annotinum and selago.
- With H. Zajac, Achmatowicz separated and determined the structure of clavatine, a new alkaloid from Lycopodium clavatum.
- With F. Werner-Zamojska, Achmatowicz characterized various organic acids connected to alkaloids.
- Achmatowicz emended formulas for annotoxine and annotin; researchers at the Warsaw Medical Academy would later examine these compounds for pharmacological activity.

Particularly important and fruitful were the studies on Nuphar luteum alkaloids. In 1960-1962 Achmatowicz, Z. Bellen, and J. Wrobel isolated four new sulfur-containing alkaloids from this plant, including thiobinupharidine and neothiobinupharidine. With H. Banaszek and J. Wrobel, Achmatowicz also identified their structure. The discovery of the new alkaloid class was described at the time as one of the year's most important achievements in organic chemistry.

In the 1960s, he also returned to the problems of strychnine chemistry with his son Selim, J. Skolik, M. Wiewiorowski and J. Szychowski. In 1966, they published a paper on the subject dedicated to Robert Robinson.

In 1964 Achmatowicz left Warsaw and assumed the position of the director of the Polish Cultural Institute in London. After five years, during which he directed the institute with great success, he returned to Poland and in autumn 1969 he retired. He would spend his retirement enjoying classical music and 18th-20th century history.

Of his three children, both sons become organic chemists. Osman became director of the Chemical Institute at the Agriculture University (SGGW) and Selim headed a division of the Institute of Electronic Materials Technology, both in Warsaw. His daughter, Emilia Kryczynska, was an author and translator.

He died on 16 April 1988 in Warsaw and was buried in the family grave at the Moslem cemetery there.

== Ambassadorial representations ==
1. Director of the Polish Cultural Institute, London (1964–1969)
2. Represented Polish chemistry at the celebrations of the centenary of the Chemical Society, London (1964)
3. UNESCO Paris General Assembly as a member of the Polish delegation and presided over the natural sciences section of the assembly (1954)
4. Overseas guest of the British Association for the Advancement of Science, Bristol (1955)
5. Headed the Polish Universities delegation to Great Britain organised by the British Council (1957): received in audience by the Queen-Mother, Chancellor of the University of London.
6. Sat on the cultural committee of the Polish-British Round Table Conference at Jablonna in 1962 and at Wilton Park in 1967.

== Meritorious awards and positions ==
1. State Orders Minister of Higher Education: awarded individual State Prize of 1st degree (1964)
2. Medal of the 10th Anniversary of People's Poland; the order of millennium (1966) for “discovering new alkaloids and studying their structure”
3. Merited Culture Activist, Distinction (1969)
4. Officer Cross of the order of “Polonia Restituta” (1951)
5. Commander Cross of the order of “Polonia Restituta” (1954)
6. Order of the Banner of Labor, First Class (1969)
7. Doctor Honoris Causa of the Technical University of Łódź (1960)
8. Director of the Polish Cultural Institute in London (1964–1969)

== Scientific memberships and positions ==
1. 1945: Polish Academy of Letters and Sciences – corresponding member
2. 1945: Warsaw Scientific Society – member
3. 1945: Łódź Scientific Society – member
4. 1952: Polish Academy of Sciences – corresponding member (full member from 1961)
5. 1980: Polish Chemical Society – honorary member (served as deputy president 1937–1939)
6. Chemical Society, London – life member
7. American Chemical Society – member
8. Swiss Chemical Society – member
9. Scientific board of the chemical journal Tetrahedron - member
10. Scientific board of Index Chemicus (Philadelphia) - member
11. Main Council of Higher Education and Qualification Commission for Scientific Staff - member (1953–1958)
12. Counselor to the Minister of Higher Education (1960–1962)
