= Strychnos alkaloids =

Class of chemical compounds

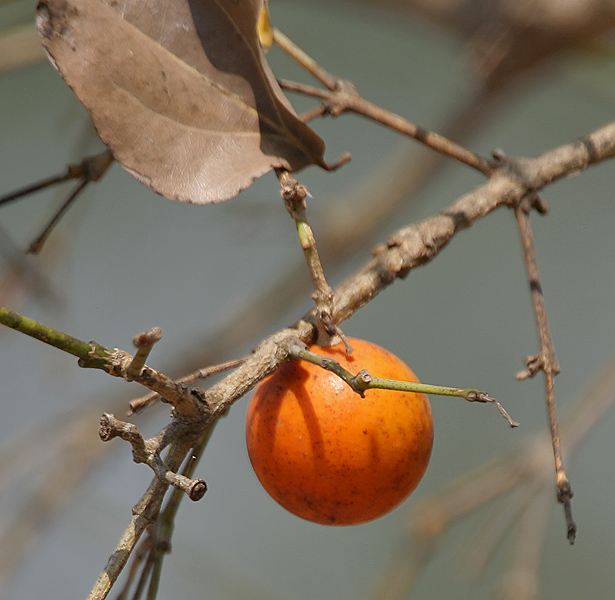
strychnine tree (Strychnos nux-vomica) fruiting

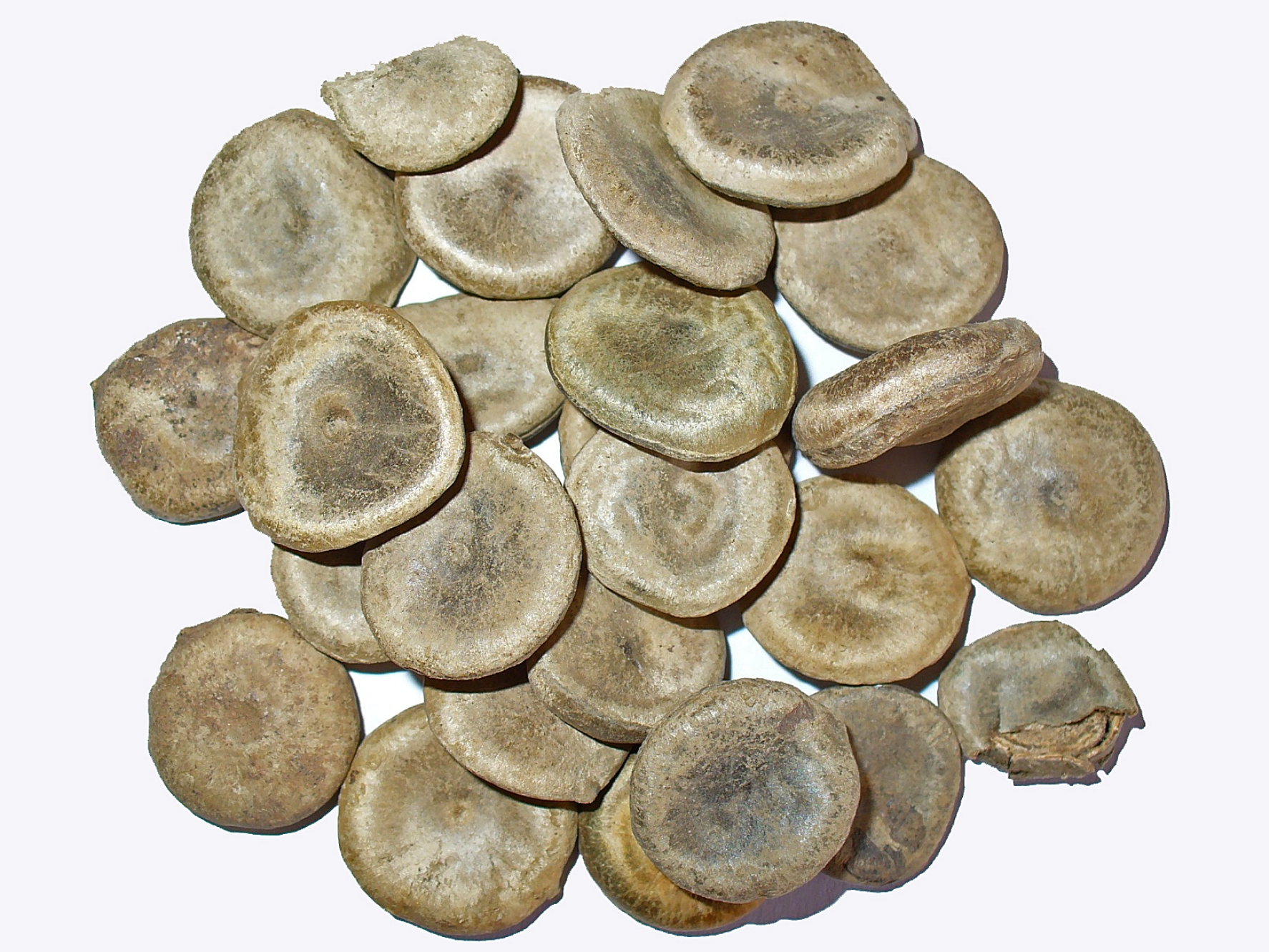
Seeds of Strychnos nux-vomica

Strychnos alkaloids are natural products primarily found in the seeds of the strychnine tree (Strychnos nux-vomica) and in the genus Catharanthus.

== Occurrence ==
The seeds of the strychnine tree contain up to 2.5% strychnine and brucine.

== Representatives ==
The primary representative of this group of alkaloids are strychnine and brucine. Other notable representatives include vomicin and acuammicin.

Strychnine

Brucine

Vomicin

Akuammicine

=== Stereochemistry ===
The naturally occurring strychnos alkaloids are all chiral and sterically uniform. When this article or the scientific literature names one of these alkaloids without adding another name, it actually states:

- acuammicine for (-)-acuammicine,
- brucine for (-)-brucine,
- strychnine for (-)-strychnine and
- vomicin for (+)-vomicin.

The bracket expressions represent the sense of rotation of the optical activity of these substances.

== Uses and pharmacological action ==
Strychnine is very toxic. In low doses, it has a stimulating to euphoric effect. A higher dose causes convulsive states. 100 to 130 mg is considered lethal to an adult human.

Brucine is similar to strychnine in structure and physiological effects. It is considered less toxic. Both alkaloids find use as rat poisons and as optically active bases in the enantiomer separation of racemate acids.

== History ==
As early as 1818, strychnine was isolated by Pierre Joseph Pelletier and Joseph Bienaimé Caventou from the Ignatius bean (Strychnos ignatii) extracted. With the structural elucidation of strychnine were engaged especially Hermann Leuchs, Robert Robinson and Heinrich Wieland. Finally, the structure was elucidated by the total synthesis (Robert B. Woodward, 1954).
