= Carlini (crater) =

Crater on the Moon

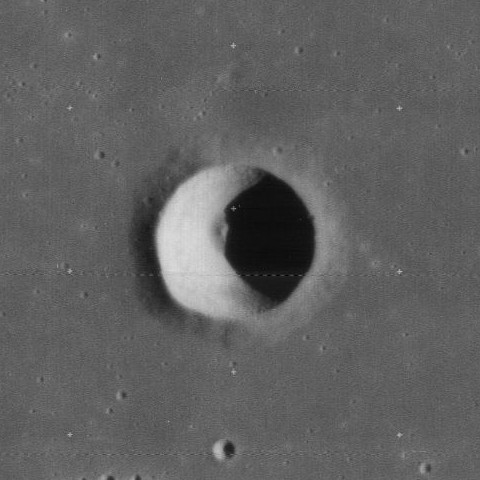
- Lunar Orbiter 4 image
- Coordinates: 33.7°N 24.1°W
- Diameter: 10.66 km (6.62 mi)
- Depth: 2 km (1.2 mi)
- Colongitude: 24° at sunrise
- Formation: Imbrian
- Eponym: Francesco Carlini

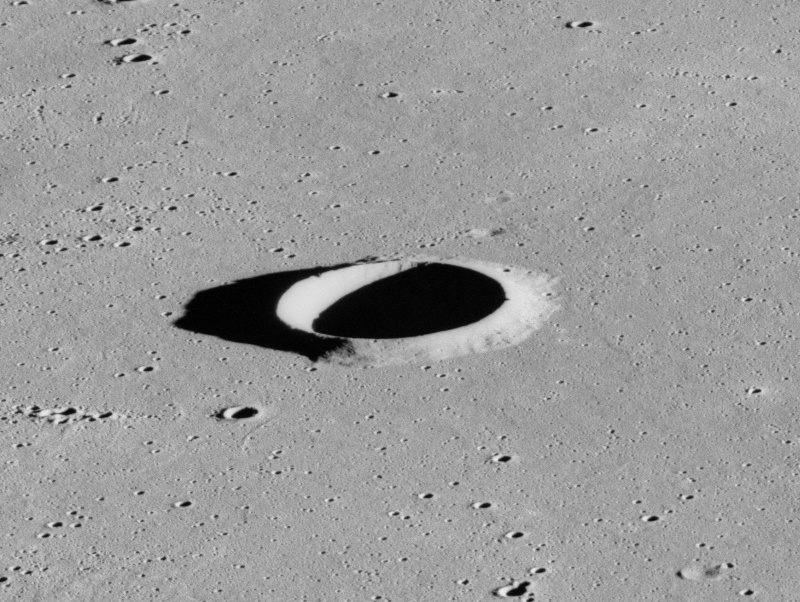
Oblique view from Apollo 15

Carlini is a small lunar impact crater located in the Mare Imbrium. This rather bright crater is bowl-shaped with a small floor and a central rise. It is in an isolated location in the surrounding mare, possibly within the central ring of the Imbrium impact. Three different titanium abundances have been measured, suggesting it has penetrated at least three different magma flows. To the south is a wrinkle ridge named Dorsum Zirkel, and farther south lies the peak Mons La Hire.

This crater was named after Italian astronomer Francesco Carlini (1783-1862). His name was introduced into lunar nomenclature during the 19th century by German astronomer J. H. von Mädler. Its designation was officially adopted by the International Astronomical Union in 1935.

== Satellite craters ==
By convention these features are identified on lunar maps by placing the letter on the side of the crater midpoint that is closest to Carlini.

Carlini	Latitude	Longitude	Diameter
A	35.4° N	26.6° W	7 km
C	35.0° N	22.9° W	4 km
D	33.0° N	16.0° W	9 km
E	31.6° N	20.5° W	1 km
G	32.6° N	25.0° W	4 km
H	32.4° N	24.4° W	4 km
K	31.1° N	23.7° W	4 km
L	31.3° N	24.8° W	3 km
S	37.9° N	27.2° W	4 km

The following crater has been renamed by the IAU.

- Carlini B — See McDonald (crater).
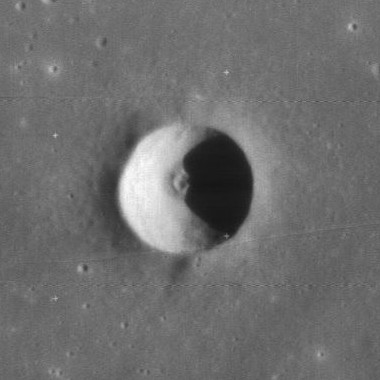
Carlini D
