= Vernon Robins =

City Chemist for Louisville, Kentucky

Vernon Robins (c. 1869 – d. January 1, 1934) was the City Chemist for Louisville, Kentucky. He received his medical degree at the University of Louisville. He was a nationally known chemist and bacteriologist.

He left the Rockefeller Institute in about 1904 and came to Louisville. In October 1922, depressed by the death of his wife, and suffering from overwork, he accidentally took an overdose of nux vomica, and had to be rescued from his office by the local police.
