= Filip Neriusz Walter =

Polish chemist (1810–1847)

Filip Neriusz Walter or Philippe Walter (31 May 1810 – 9 April 1847) was a Polish chemist and pioneer of organic chemistry who worked in Paris. He extracted and characterized several compounds, including toluene and octene.

== Life ==
At 15 years old, Walter was one of the youngest students of the Jagiellonian University in Kraków, where he studied history and chemistry in 1825–28. Subsequently, he studied at Berlin University, receiving a Ph.D. with his dissertation On Combination of Oxalic Acid and Alkali. Simultaneously he served as assistant to Professor Eilhard Mitscherlich.

On the outbreak of the November 1830 Uprising, he went to Warsaw and joined the Polish Army. He served as adjutant to Colonel Samuel Różycki, commander of the 7th infantry regiment. In 1831, aged 21, he was named professor of chemistry at the Jagiellonian University, but he left to Paris where he worked with Jean-Baptiste Dumas at the École Centrale des Arts et Manufactures. Here Walter began to teach analytical chemistry. He examined plant extracts and along with Pierre Joseph Pelletier he extracted toluene by distillation of pine resin in 1838. In 1840 they extracted octene (C_{8}H_{16}) from naphtha. Walter was able to demonstrate the substitution of carbon by sulphur in camphor in 1842. His achievements won him recognition from the French Academy. In sum, he isolated and studied 24 new chemical compounds, including toluene, biphenyl, nitrotoluene, cedrene, potassium hydroxide dihydrate, chromyl chloride, cumene, benzyl chloride, benzyl bromide, and menthene.

In 1847 he was decorated with the cross of the Legion of Honour.

== See also ==
- List of Poles

== Bibliography ==
1. "Walter, Filip Neriusz", in Stanley S. Sokol, The Polish Biographical Dictionary, Bolchazy-Carducci Publishers, 1992.
2. Stefan Sękowski, Stefan Szostkiewicz, Serce i retorta (The Heart and the Retort), Warsaw, Wiedza Powszechna, 1957.
3. Aleksander Jełowicki, Wspomnienia (Memoirs), Paris, 1839.
4. Stanisław Wodzicki, Wspomnienia z przeszłości (Memoirs of the Past). Kraków, 1873.
5. Adolphe Wurz, Historia poglądów chemicznych (A History of Chemical Views), Warsaw, 1886.
