= Joseph Bienaimé Caventou =

French pharmacist (1795–1877)

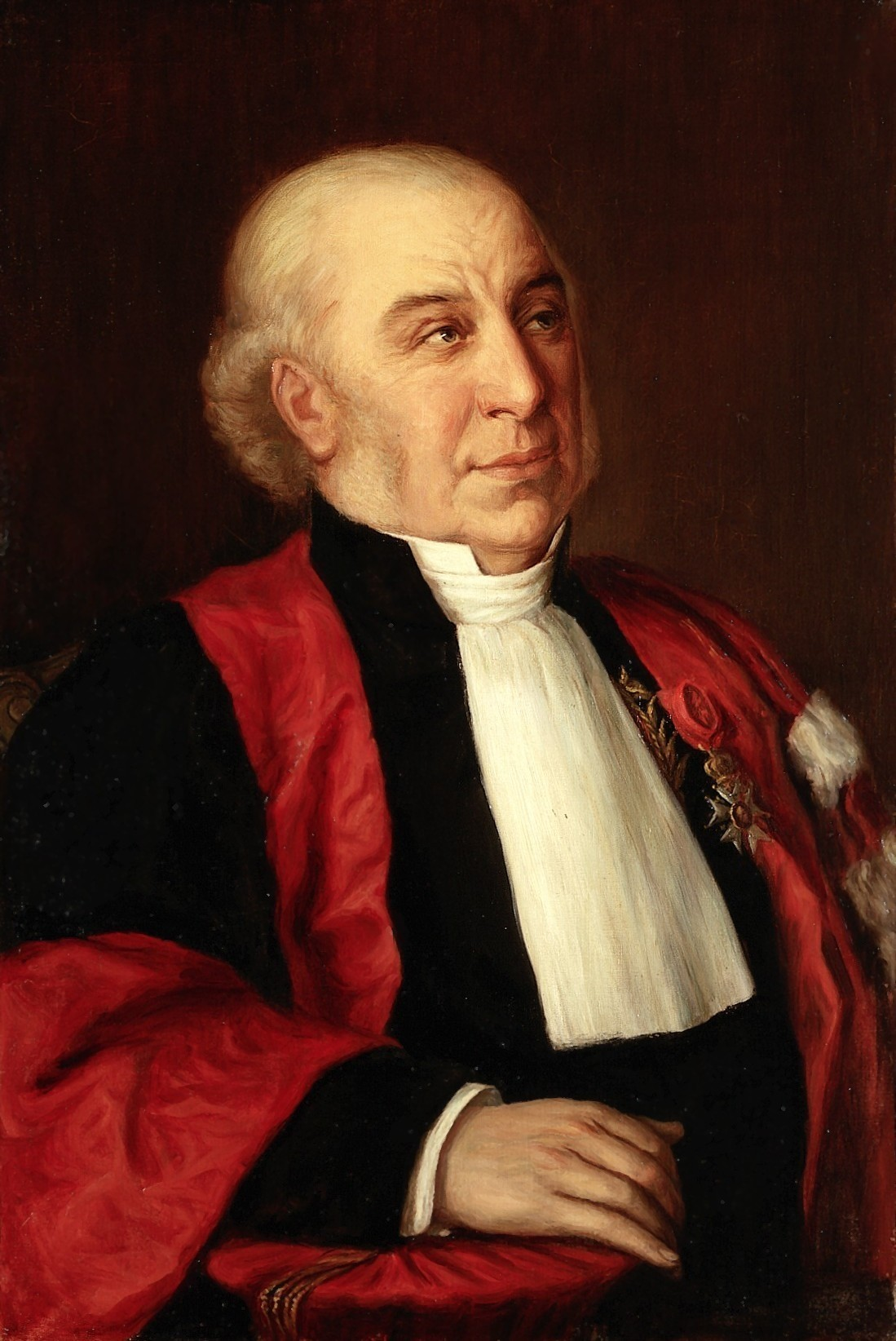
- Born: 30 June 1795; Saint-Omer, French First Republic
- Died: 5 May 1877 (aged 81); Paris, French Third Republic
- Education: Ecole de Pharmacie de Paris
- Known for: Isolating alkaloids from vegetables
- Awards: Elected to the Académie Nationale de Médecine in 1821
- Scientific career
- Fields: Pharmacology, chemistry

Joseph Bienaimé Caventou (French pronunciation: [ʒozɛf bjɛ̃nɛme kavɑ̃tu]; 30 June 1795 – 5 May 1877) was a French pharmacist. He was a professor at the École de Pharmacie (School of Pharmacy) in Paris. He collaborated with Pierre-Joseph Pelletier in a Parisian laboratory located behind an apothecary. He was a pioneer in the use of mild solvents to isolate a number of active ingredients from plants, making a study of alkaloids from vegetables. Among their successes were the isolation of the following compounds:

Year	Isolated compound(s)	Source
1817	Chlorophyll	
1817	Emetine	Ipecacuanha
1818	Strychnine	Nux vomica
1819	Brucine	Nux vomica
1820	Cinchonine and quinine	Cinchona bark
1821	Caffeine	

Quinine sulfate later proved to be an important remedy for the disease malaria. Quinine is the active anti-malarial ingredient in the bark of cinchona tree.

Neither of the partners chose to patent their discovery of this compound, releasing it for everybody to use. In 1823 they discovered nitrogen in alkaloid compounds. Other compounds they discovered include colchicine and veratrine.

The crater Caventou on the Moon is named after him.
