= Polish Biographical Dictionary =

Biographical dictionary

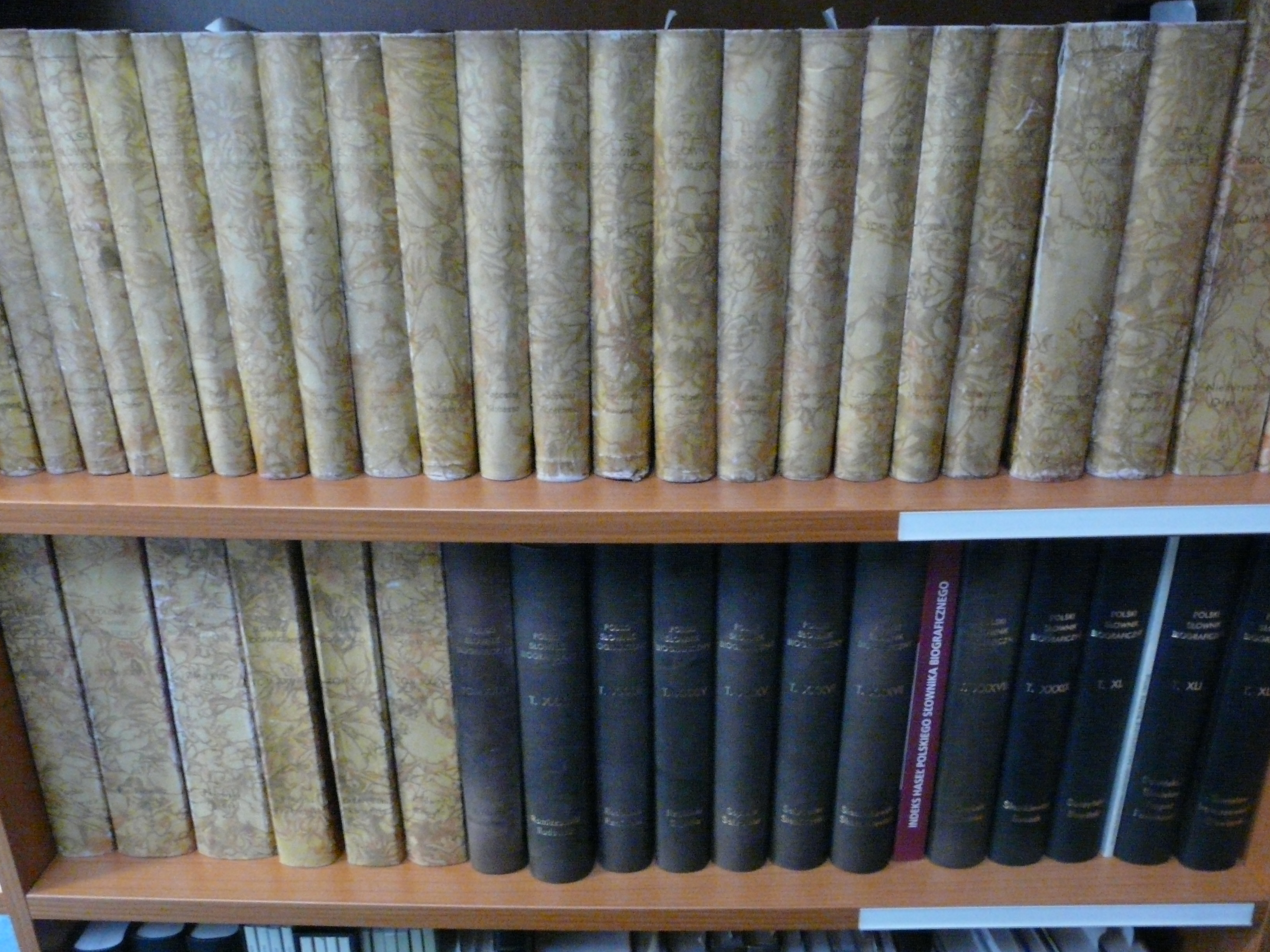
- Polish Biographical Dictionary at the Silesian library
- Editors: Andrzej Romanowski et al.
- Author: est. 4,000 contributors
- Original title: Polski Słownik Biograficzny
- Language: Polish
- Publisher: Polish Academy of Learning; Polish Academy of Sciences
- Publication date: 1935–ongoing
- Publication place: Poland
- Media type: print, soft cover
- ISBN: 978-83-86301-01-0
- OCLC: 221985208
- Website: Official website

The Polish Biographical Dictionary (Polish: Polski Słownik Biograficzny, PSB) is a Polish-language biographical dictionary, comprising an alphabetically arranged compilation of authoritative biographies of some 25,000 notable Poles and of foreigners who have been active in Poland – famous as well as less-well-known persons – from Popiel, Piast Kołodziej, and Mieszko I, at the dawn of Polish history, to persons who died in the year 2000.

The Dictionary, published incrementally since 1935, is a work in progress. It currently covers entries from A to S and its completion is expected about 2030.

The PSB is, by its own assessment, "at present... one of the world's leading biographical publications." Outside Poland, it is available at the British Library, the Library of Congress, the Vatican Library, the Hoover Institution on War, Revolution and Peace, the University of California at Berkeley, Stanford University, the Getty Museum, and many other national and major research libraries.

== Character ==
As of February 2021, 52 complete volumes have been produced, with entries to "T". The latest installment is fascicle 225, the second of volume 55.

The Dictionary's current 52 volumes (well into "T") range in length from 480 to 830 pages, for a total of over 33,000, and contain over 27,000 biographies. Some 8,000 individuals have contributed to the Dictionary. Most of its contents are available only in paper form.

Though not a comprehensive source on all notable Poles, the Dictionary is substantial and well-respected. Brock et al. write that the "Polish Biographical Dictionary is one of the major achievements of the humanities in 20th-century Poland. The entries reflect the multicultural and multiethnic composition of the pre-partition Polish state [...]. Therefore the dictionary is not 'a biographical dictionary of Poles,' but rather 'a Polish biographical dictionary,' including entries on prominent foreigners who lived in the country as well as representatives of national minorities."

While prewar Polish governments had little influence on Dictionary's editorial policies, the postwar communist government of the People's Republic of Poland interfered substantially regarding who should be included. Since Poland's 1989 break with the Soviet bloc, this bias has been partly corrected in several supplements.

Polski słownik biograficzny constitutes a mosaic that depicts the full sweep of Polish history through biographies of many of the country's notable people.

== History ==
This reference work has been published in Kraków since 1935, although publication was suspended during Poland's World War II occupation by Nazi Germany and during the Stalinist period. The Dictionary is a joint publication of the Polish Academy of Sciences (Polska Akademia Nauk) and the Polish Academy of Learning (Polska Akademia Umiejętności). The project is based at the Tadeusz Manteuffel Historical Institute and is sponsored by the Foundation for Polish Learning (Fundacja na Rzecz Nauki Polskiej) and the Ministry of Culture and National Heritage (Ministerstwo Kultury i Dziedzictwa Narodowego).

Work at the Dictionary was initiated by Władysław Konopczyński. The first volume appeared in 1935, and four more (with coverage to "Dąbrowski, Ignacy") before World War II. After the war, by 1949, when Konopczyński was forced by the communist government to resign his editorship, two more volumes had been published (covering bios to "Firlej, Henryk"). The project was then frozen until 1958, when it was revived under Kazimierz Lepszy. In 1964, after the Dictionary had grown by an additional three volumes (covering bios to "Jarosiński, Paweł"), Lepszy died and was replaced by Emanuel Rostworowski.

During Rostworowski's tenure as editor, the quality of the biographies increased, while government interference and censorship decreased. Twenty-two further volumes had been published (covering bios to "Różycki, Ignacy") when Rostworowski in 1989 passed the baton to Henryk Markiewicz. Under Markiewicz, nine further volumes were published (covering bios to Stanisław August Poniatowski), as well as a special volume Uzupełnienia i sprostowania do tomów I-XL (Supplements and corrections for volumes 1–40) rectifying communist-era bias and censorship. Since 2003, the Dictionary's editor has been Andrzej Romanowski. The PSB estimates their work will be complete around 2030, with expected 62 volumes.

In 2003, the PSB has launched its official Internet homepage. In 2010, the project has been unanimously endorsed by the Polish parliament (Sejm), and given its honorary patronage.

== See also ==
- List of Poles
- List of Polish Americans
- The Polish Biographical Dictionary
- Polish nobility
- Polish people
- Who's Who directories
