= Polish Cultural Institute in London =

Polish cultural institution

Polish Cultural Institute in London Instytut Kultury Polskiej w Londynie
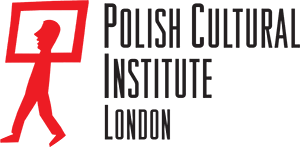
- Address: 10 Bouverie Street; London EC4Y 8AX
- Coordinates: 51°30′48″N 0°06′29″W
- Website: https://instytutpolski.pl/london/

Polish Cultural Institute in London is a Polish cultural institution in the capital of the United Kingdom under the Ministry of Foreign Affairs of Poland.

== Activities ==
The main purpose of the Institute is to fulfil the tasks of public diplomacy, i.e. to maintain good social, scientific, and cultural relations between Poland and Great Britain. The Institute organizes exhibitions, concerts, film screenings, book promotions, and book translations, and coordinates scientific and cultural exchange. The aim of the Institute is to disseminate knowledge about Poland: culture, art, science, history, economy, politics, and sociology. The Institute's activity is also partly directed to the Polish community in the United Kingdom.

The Institute was established in 1938, but the first director was appointed 10 years later. From 2014, its seat is located on 10 Bouverie Street. Before that, it was located at 52-53 Poland Street. Previously, it was located at 34 Portland Place and 16 Devonshire Street. During the communist era, the Institute was boycotted by the British and the Polish community. Since 2003 the Institute has been organizing the Polish Film Festival "Kinoteka".

== Directors ==
- 1948–1951 – Antoni Słonimski
- 1962–1964 – Tadeusz Wujek
- 1964–1969 – Osman Achmatowicz
- 1969–1972 – Grzegorz Leopold Seidler
- 1972-1974 – Tadeusz Cieślak
- 1974–1978 – Ernest Bryll
- 1979–1985 – Irena Gabor-Jatczak
- 1985–1993 – Karol Drozd
- 1993–1997 – Hanna Mausch
- 1998–1999 – Aleksandra Czapiewska, Elżbieta Łyszkowska, Barbara Kościelny p.o.
- 2000–2001 – Joanna Wróblewska
- 2002–2005 – Joanna Stachyra
- 2005–2009 – Paweł Potoroczyn
- 2009–2013 – Roland Chojnacki
- 2013–2016 – Anna Godlewska
- 2016–2019 – Robert Szaniawski
- 2019–2023 – Marta de Zuniga
- 2023–2024 – Bartosz Wiśniewski
- since 2025 – Anna Tryc-Bromley

== See also ==
- The Embassy of the Republic of Poland in London
- Polish Institute and Sikorski Museum
- Polish Social and Cultural Association
- Polish Hearth Club
