= Thomas Logie MacDonald =

Scottish astronomer and politician

Thomas Logie MacDonald FRSE FRAS (1901–1973) was a Scottish astronomer and politician, and eponym of lunar crater McDonald.

He was a graduate of Glasgow University, and became secretary and chairman of the West of Scotland branch of the British Astronomical Association. From 1929 to 1931 he served as President of the West of Scotland Branch of the British Astronomical Association.

He was elected a fellow of the Royal Society of Edinburgh on 5 March 1928. His proposers were Hector Copland Macpherson, Ralph Allan Sampson, Ludwig Becker and Edward Taylor Jones. He resigned from the Society in 1961.

From 1938 he served as Director of the Lunar Section of the British Astronomical Association, serving throughout the Second World War until 1946. At this time he lived at 9 Colebrooke Terrace in Glasgow.

MacDonald was a Labour councillor and Mayor of Carlisle from May 1961 to 1962. The Carlisle/Flensburg (Germany) town twinning relationship was established during his mayoral term.

== Publications ==
- Astronomy for Adult Classes (1932)
- Studies in Lunar Statistics
- The Depression of Lunar Craters (1942)
- The Astronomer as Historical Detective (lecture)
- The Origins of Martian Nomenclature (1971)
