= Francesco Carlini =

Italian astronomer (1783–1862)

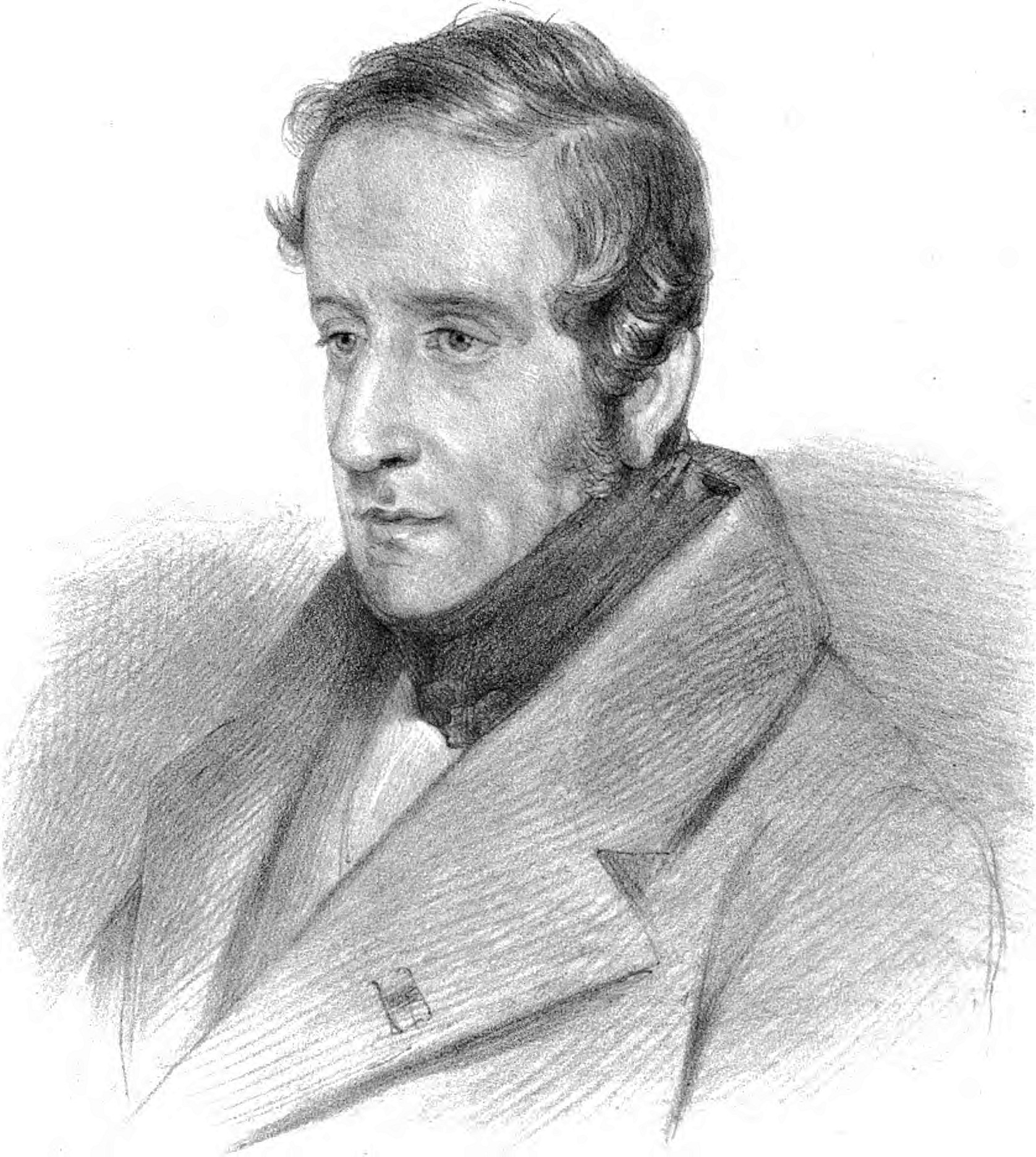
- Francesco Carlini
- Born: 7 January 1783; Milan, Duchy of Milan
- Died: 29 August 1862 (aged 79); Milan, Kingdom of Italy
- Education: University of Pavia
- Occupation: Astronomer
- Awards: Lalande Prize (1828)
- Scientific career
- Fields: Astronomy
- Workplaces: Brera Astronomical Observatory

Francesco Carlini (January 7, 1783 – August 29, 1862) was an Italian astronomer.

== Biography ==
Born in Milan on 7 January 1783, he studied astronomy under Barnaba Oriani, and became director of the Brera Astronomical Observatory in 1832. He published Nuove tavole de moti apparenti del sole in 1832. In 1810, he had already published Esposizione di un nuovo metodo di construire le tavole astronomiche applicato alle tavole del sole. Together with Giovanni Antonio Amedeo Plana, he participated in a geodetic project in Austria and Italy. During this trip in 1821 he took pendulum measurements on top of Mount Cenis, Italy, from which he calculated one of the first estimates of the density and mass of the Earth. He died in Milan on 29 August 1862. The crater Carlini on the Moon is named after him.

== Bibliography ==
- Tucci, Pasquale (2007). "Carlini, Francesco". Biographical Encyclopedia of Astronomers. New York, NY: Springer. p. 1270. doi:10.1007/978-0-387-30400-7_9032.
