= Caventou (crater) =

Crater on the Moon

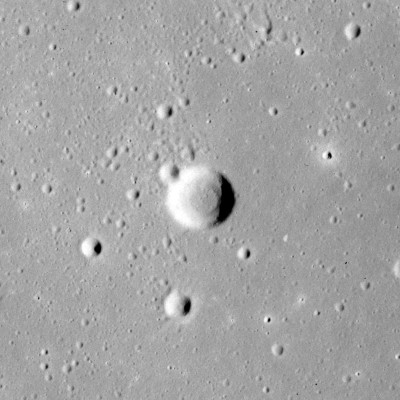
- Apollo 15 image
- Coordinates: 29.8°N 29.4°W
- Diameter: 2.80 km (1.74 mi)
- Depth: 0.4 km (0.25 mi)
- Colongitude: 20° at sunrise
- Eponym: Joseph B. Caventou

Caventou is a tiny lunar impact crater located in the western part of the Mare Imbrium, due north of Euler crater. It is a circular, cup-shaped formation surrounded by the lunar mare.

This formation is named after French chemist and pharmacologist Joseph B. Caventou (1795-1877). Its designation was formally approved by the International Astronomical Union in 1976. Prior to that, it had the designation La Hire D, being associated with the mountain Mons La Hire to the southeast.
