= Dorsum Zirkel =

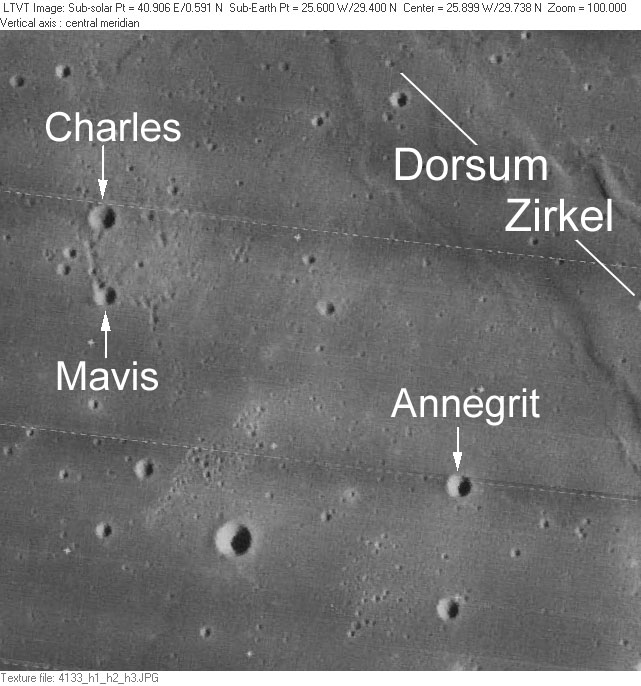
Dorsum Zirkel is on the top right of the photo

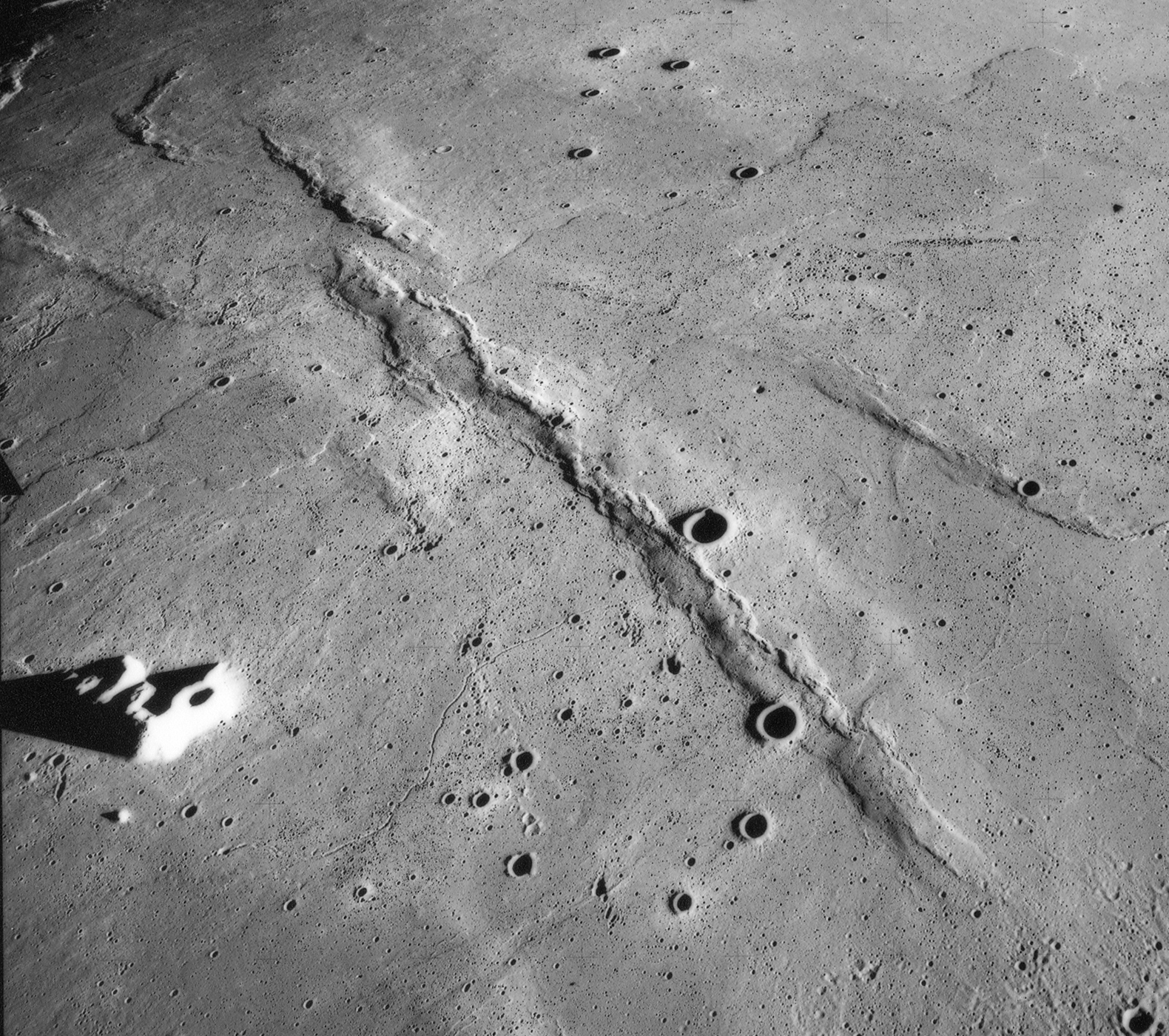
Oblique view of Dorsum Zirkel from Apollo 15, taken at a low sun angle

Dorsum Zirkel is a wrinkle ridge at 29.6°N 24.8°W northeast of Mons La Hire in Mare Imbrium on the Moon. It is 193 km long and was named after German geologist Ferdinand Zirkel in 1976.

Two small craters, La Hire A and B, lie on either side of the dorsum. The large crater Lambert is to the southeast, and the smaller McDonald is to the northeast.
