= The Polish Biographical Dictionary =

English–language dictionary of Polish biography

The Polish Biographical Dictionary is a compact English–language biographical dictionary of Polish people, authored by Stanley S. Sokol (1923–2017) and published by Bolchazy-Carducci Publishers in 1992. It features nearly 900 biographies of important Poles since Duke Mieszko I in the 10th century.

== See also ==
- List of Polish people
- List of Polish Americans
- Polish nobility
- Polski Słownik Biograficzny (in English, Polish Biographical Dictionary), a multi-volume Polish-language biographical dictionary
- Who's Who directories
