= McDonald (crater) =

Crater on the Moon

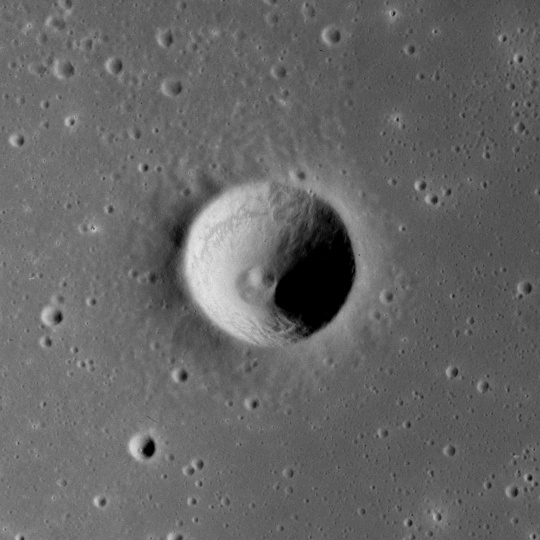
- Apollo 15 image
- Coordinates: 30.4°N 20.9°W
- Diameter: 8 km
- Depth: 1.17 km
- Colongitude: 21° at sunrise
- Eponym: William Johnson McDonald and Thomas Logie MacDonald

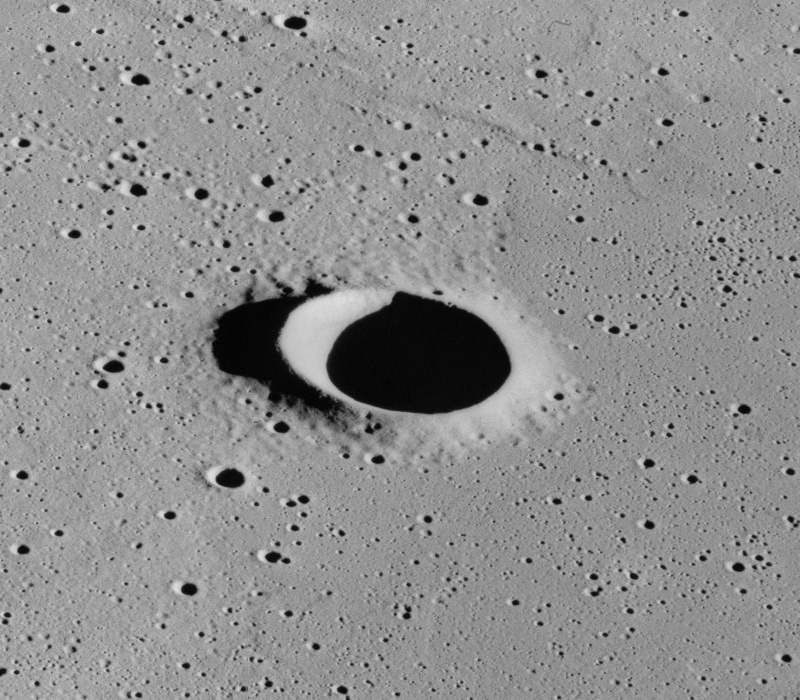
Oblique Apollo 15 image

McDonald is a small lunar impact crater located in the central Mare Imbrium. It was named after American benefactor William Johnson McDonald and Scottish selenographer Thomas Logie MacDonald. This crater is a cup-shaped feature with a circular rim, and has not been significantly eroded. It lies to the southeast of the slightly larger crater Carlini, in an isolated part of the mare.

This feature was identified as 'Carlini B' prior to being renamed by the IAU.
