= Strychnine =

Poisonous substance used as pesticide

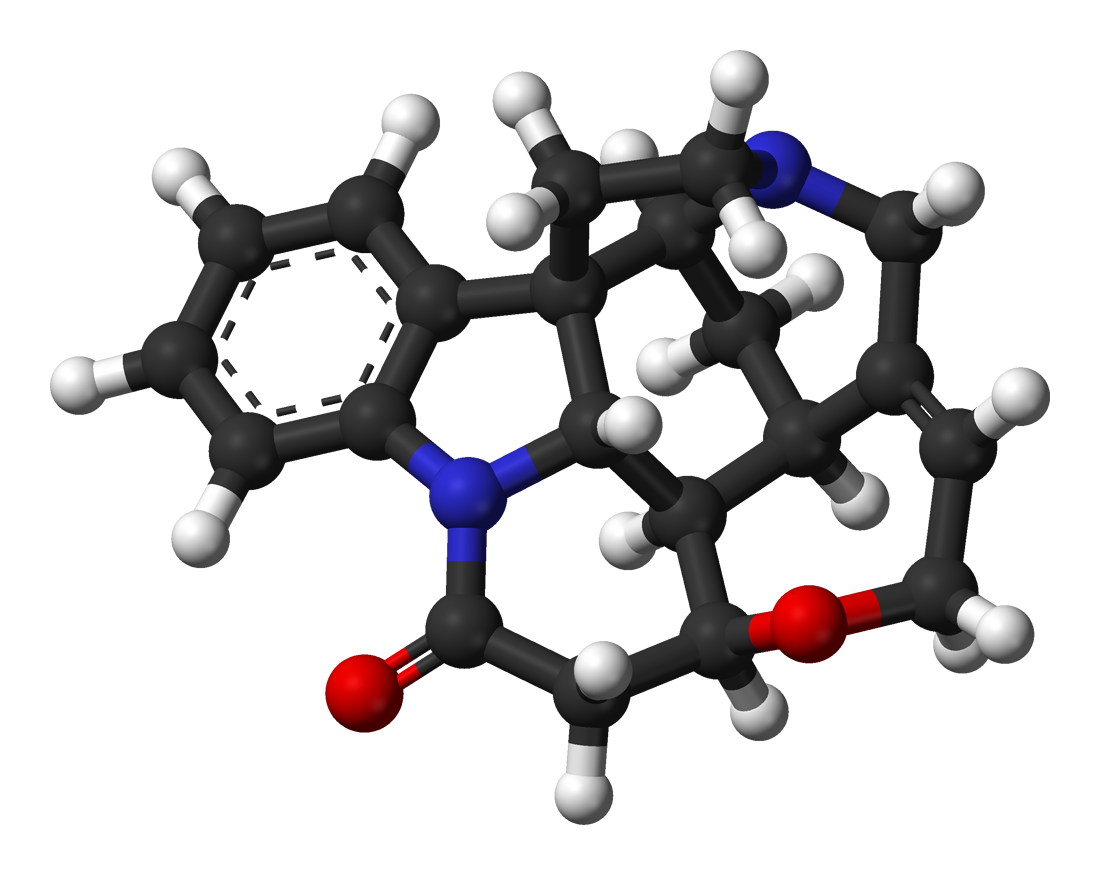

Names
- IUPAC name Strychnidin-10-one
- Systematic IUPAC name (4bR,4b^{1}S,7aS,8aR,8a^{1}R,12aS)-4b^{1},5,6,7a,8,8a,8a^{1},11,12a,13-Decahydro-14H-12-oxa-7,14a-diaza-7,9-methanocyclohepta[cd]cyclopenta[g]fluoranthen-14-one

Identifiers
| CAS Number | 57-24-9 (base); 60-41-3 (sulfate) |
| 3D model (JSmol) | Interactive image |
| ChEBI | CHEBI:28973 |
| ChEMBL | ChEMBL227934; ChEMBL612118; ChEMBL486399 |
| ChemSpider | 389877 |
| ECHA InfoCard | 100.000.290 |
| IUPHAR/BPS | 347 |
| KEGG | C06522 |
| PubChem CID | 441071 |
| RTECS number | WL2275000 |
| UNII | H9Y79VD43J (base); FA486DV76S (sulfate) |
| UN number | 1692 |
| CompTox Dashboard (EPA) | DTXSID6023600 |
- InChI: InChI=1S/C21H22N2O2/c24-18-10-16-19-13-9-17-21(6-7-22(17)11-12(13)5-8-25-16)14-3-1-2-4-15(14)23(18)20(19)21/h1-5,13,16-17,19-20H,6-11H2/t13-,16-,17-,19-,20-,21+/m0/s1 Key: QMGVPVSNSZLJIA-FVWCLLPLSA-N; InChI=1/C21H22N2O2/c24-18-10-16-19-13-9-17-21(6-7-22(17)11-12(13)5-8-25-16)14-3-1-2-4-15(14)23(18)20(19)21/h1-5,13,16-17,19-20H,6-11H2/t13-,16-,17-,19-,20-,21+/m0/s1 Key: QMGVPVSNSZLJIA-FVWCLLPLBR
- SMILES: O=C7N2c1ccccc1[C@@]64[C@@H]2[C@@H]3[C@@H](OC/C=C5\[C@@H]3C[C@@H]6N(CC4)C5)C7

Properties
| Chemical formula | C_{21}H_{22}N_{2}O_{2} |
| Molar mass | 334.419 g·mol^{−1} |
| Appearance | White or translucent crystal or crystalline powder; Bitter tasting |
| Odor | Odorless |
| Density | 1.36 g cm^{−3} |
| Melting point | 270 °C; 518 °F; 543 K |
| Boiling point | 284 to 286 °C; 543 to 547 °F; 557 to 559 K |
| Solubility in water | 0.02% (20°C) |
| Acidity (pK_{a}) | 8.25 |

Pharmacology
| Legal status | BR: Class F4 (Other prohibited substances) |

Hazards
- Occupational safety and health (OHS/OSH)
| Main hazards | Extremely toxic |
- GHS labelling
| Pictograms | (GHS06: Toxic) (GHS09: Environmental hazard) |
| Signal word | Danger |
| Hazard statements | H300, H310, H330, H410 |
| Precautionary statements | P260, P264, P273, P280, P284, P301+P310 |
| NFPA 704 (fire diamond) | 4 0 0 |
| Flash point | Non flammable |
| Autoignition temperature | Non flammable |
- Lethal dose or concentration (LD, LC)
| LD_{50} (median dose) | 0.5 mg/kg (dog, oral); 0.5 mg/kg (cat, oral); 2 mg/kg (mouse, oral); 16 mg/kg (rat, oral); 2.35 mg/kg (rat, oral) |
| LD_{Lo} (lowest published) | 0.6 mg/kg (rabbit, oral) |
- NIOSH (US health exposure limits)
| PEL (Permissible) | TWA 0.15 mg/m^{3} |
| REL (Recommended) | TWA 0.15 mg/m^{3} |
| IDLH (Immediate danger) | 3 mg/m^{3} |
- Except where otherwise noted, data are given for materials in their standard state (at 25 °C [77 °F], 100 kPa). verify (what is ?) Infobox references

Strychnine (/ˈstrɪkniːn, -nɪn/, STRIK-neen, -nin, US chiefly /-naɪn/ -nyne) is a highly toxic, colorless, bitter, crystalline alkaloid used as a pesticide, particularly for killing small vertebrates such as birds and rodents. Strychnine, when inhaled, swallowed, or absorbed through the eyes or mouth, causes poisoning which results in muscular convulsions and eventually death through asphyxia. While it is no longer used medicinally, it was used historically in small doses to strengthen muscle contractions, such as a heart and bowel stimulant and performance-enhancing drug. The most common source is from the seeds of the Strychnos nux-vomica tree.

== Biosynthesis ==
Strychnine biosynthesis

Strychnine is a terpene indole alkaloid belonging to the Strychnos family of Corynanthe alkaloids, and it is derived from tryptamine and secologanin. The biosynthesis of strychnine was solved in 2022. The enzyme, strictosidine synthase, catalyzes the condensation of tryptamine and secologanin, followed by a Pictet-Spengler reaction to form strictosidine. Many steps have been inferred by isolation of intermediates from Strychnos nux-vomica. The next step is hydrolysis of the acetal, which opens the ring by elimination of glucose (O-Glu) and provides a reactive aldehyde. The nascent aldehyde is then attacked by a secondary amine to afford geissoschizine, a common intermediate of many related compounds in the Strychnos family.

A reverse Pictet-Spengler reaction cleaves the C2–C3 bond, while subsequently forming the C3–C7 bond via a 1,2-alkyl migration, an oxidation from a Cytochrome P450 enzyme to a spiro-oxindole, nucleophilic attack from the enol at C16, and elimination of oxygen forms the C2–C16 bond to provide dehydropreakuammicine. Hydrolysis of the methyl ester and decarboxylation leads to norfluorocurarine. Stereospecific reduction of the endocyclic double bond by NADPH and hydroxylation provides the Wieland-Gumlich aldehyde, which was first isolated by Heimberger and Scott in 1973, although previously synthesized by Wieland and Gumlich in 1932. To elongate the appendage by two carbons, acetyl-CoA is added to the aldehyde in an aldol reaction to afford prestrychnine. Strychnine is then formed by a facile addition of the amine with the carboxylic acid or its activated CoA thioester, followed by ring-closure via displacement of an activated alcohol.

== Chemical synthesis ==
As early researchers noted, the strychnine molecular structure, with its specific array of rings, stereocenters, and nitrogen functional groups, is a complex synthetic target, and has stimulated interest for that reason and for interest in the structure–activity relationships underlying its pharmacologic activities. An early synthetic chemist targeting strychnine, Robert Burns Woodward, quoted the chemist who determined its structure through chemical decomposition and related physical studies as saying that "for its molecular size it is the most complex organic substance known" (attributed to Sir Robert Robinson).

The first total synthesis of strychnine was reported by the research group of R. B. Woodward in 1954, and is considered a classic in this field. The Woodward account published in 1954 was very brief (3 pages), but was followed by a 42-page report in 1963. The molecule has since received continuing wide attention in the years since for the challenges to synthetic organic strategy and tactics presented by its complexity; its synthesis has been targeted and its stereocontrolled preparation independently achieved by more than a dozen research groups since the first success.

== Mechanism of action ==
Strychnine is a neurotoxin which acts as an antagonist of glycine and acetylcholine receptors. It primarily affects the motor nerve fibers in the spinal cord which control muscle contraction. An impulse is triggered at one end of a nerve cell by the binding of neurotransmitters to the receptors. In the presence of an inhibitory neurotransmitter, such as glycine, a greater quantity of excitatory neurotransmitters must bind to receptors before an action potential is generated. Glycine acts primarily as an agonist of the glycine receptor, which is a ligand-gated chloride channel in neurons located in the spinal cord and in the brain. This chloride channel allows the negatively charged chloride ions into the neuron, causing a hyperpolarization which pushes the membrane potential further from threshold. Strychnine is an antagonist of glycine; it binds noncovalently to the same receptor, preventing the inhibitory effects of glycine on the postsynaptic neuron. Therefore, action potentials are triggered with lower levels of excitatory neurotransmitters. When the inhibitory signals are prevented, the motor neurons are more easily activated and the victim has spastic muscle contractions, resulting in death by asphyxiation. Strychnine binds the Aplysia californica acetylcholine binding protein (a homolog of nicotinic receptors) with high affinity but low specificity, and does so in multiple conformations.

== Toxicity ==
Strychnine is very toxic to humans (minimum lethal oral dose in adults is 30–120 mg) and many other animals (oral LD_{50} = 16 mg/kg in rats, 2 mg/kg in mice), and poisoning by inhalation, swallowing, or absorption through eyes or mouth can be fatal. S. nux-vomica seeds are generally effective as a poison only when they are crushed or chewed before swallowing because the pericarp is quite hard and indigestible; poisoning symptoms may therefore not appear if the seeds are ingested whole.

=== Animal toxicity ===
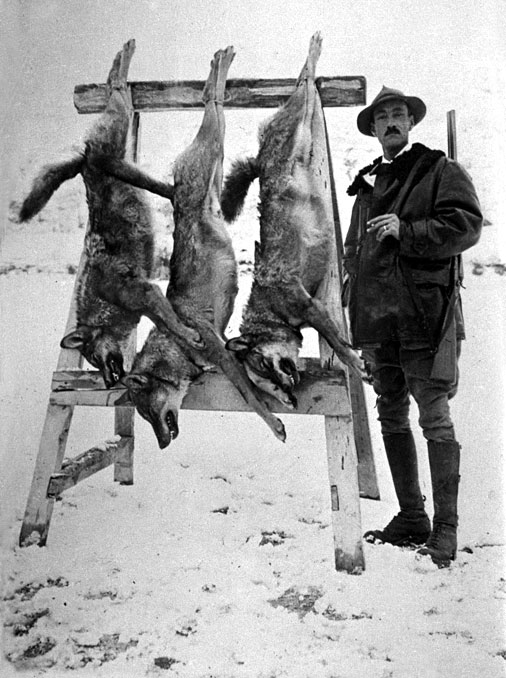
Wolves poisoned with strychnine in Abruzzo National Park, Italy, 1924.

Strychnine poisoning in animals usually occurs from ingestion of baits designed for use against gophers, rats, squirrels, moles, chipmunks and coyotes. Strychnine is also used as a rodenticide, but is not specific to such unwanted pests and may kill other small animals. In the United States, most baits containing strychnine have been replaced with zinc phosphide baits since 1990. In the European Union, rodenticides with strychnine have been forbidden since 2006. Some animals are immune to strychnine; usually these have evolved resistance to poisonous strychnos alkaloids in the fruit they eat, such as fruit bats. The drugstore beetle has a symbiotic gut yeast that allows it to digest pure strychnine.

Strychnine toxicity in rats is dependent on sex. It is more toxic to females than to males when administered via subcutaneous injection or intraperitoneal injection. Differences are due to higher rates of metabolism by male rat liver microsomes. Dogs and cats are more susceptible among domestic animals, pigs are believed to be as susceptible as dogs, and horses are able to tolerate relatively large amounts of strychnine. Birds affected by strychnine poisoning exhibit wing droop, salivation, tremors, muscle tenseness, and convulsions. Death occurs as a result of respiratory arrest. The clinical signs of strychnine poisoning relate to its effects on the central nervous system. The first clinical signs of poisoning include nervousness, restlessness, twitching of the muscles, and stiffness of the neck. As the poisoning progresses, the muscular twitching becomes more pronounced and convulsions suddenly appear in all the skeletal muscles. The limbs are extended and the neck is curved to opisthotonus. The pupils are widely dilated. As death approaches, the convulsions follow one another with increased rapidity, severity, and duration. Death results from asphyxia due to prolonged paralysis of the respiratory muscles. Following the ingestion of strychnine, symptoms of poisoning usually appear within 15 to 60 minutes.

The LD_{50} values for strychnine in animals
| Organism | Route | LD_{50} (mg/kg) | Ref. |
|---|---|---|---|
| Bird (wild) | Oral | 16 | |
| Cat | Intravenous | 0.33 | |
| Cat | Oral | 0.5 | |
| Dog | Intravenous | 0.8 | |
| Dog | Subcutaneous | 0.35 | |
| Dog | Oral | 0.5 | |
| Duck | Oral | 3.0 | |
| Mouse | Intraperitoneal | 0.98 | |
| Mouse | Intravenous | 0.41 | |
| Mouse | Oral | 2.0 | |
| Mouse | Parenteral | 1.06 | |
| Mouse | Subcutaneous | 0.47 | |
| Pigeon | Oral | 21.0 | |
| Quail | Oral | 23.0 | |
| Rabbit | Intravenous | 0.4 | |
| Rabbit | Oral | 0.6 | |
| Rat | Oral | 16.0 | |
| Rat | Intravenous | 2.35 | |

=== Human toxicity ===
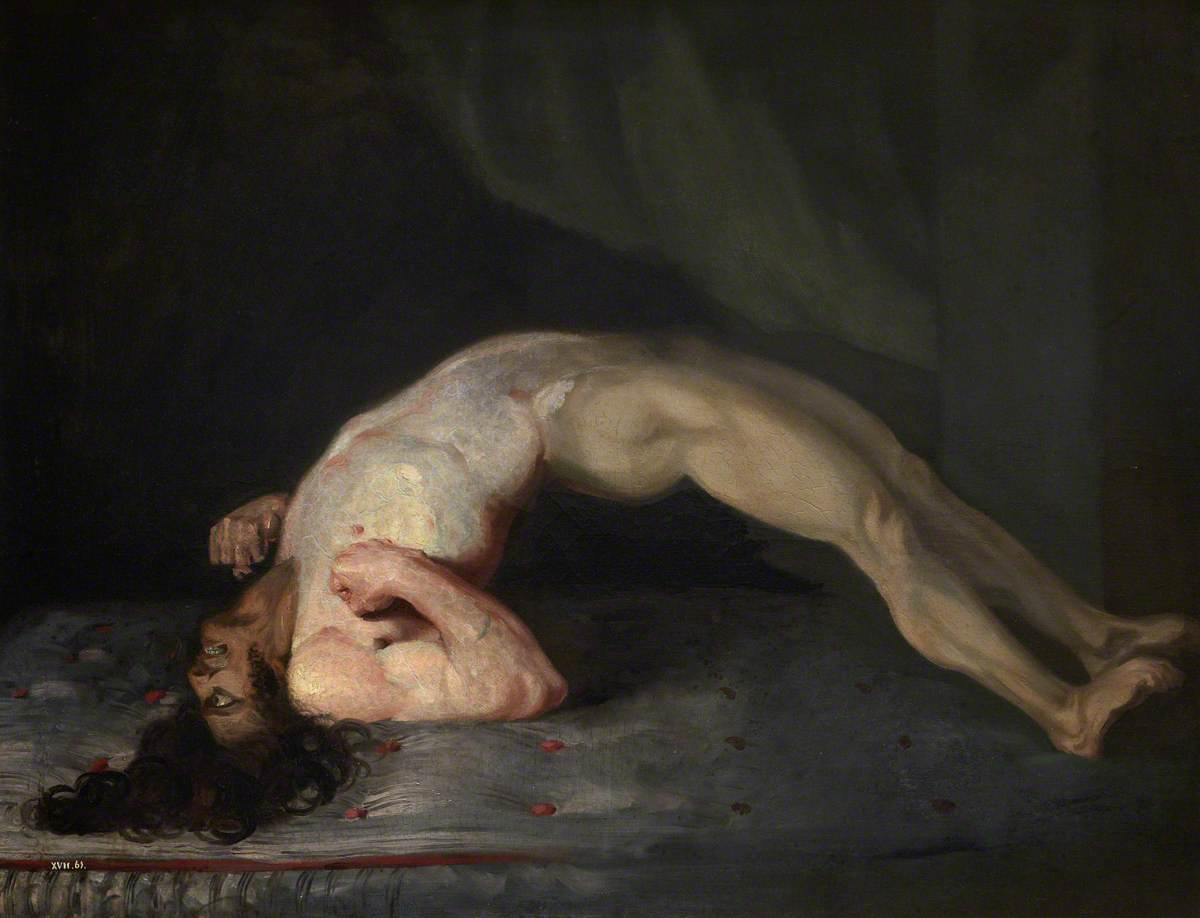
An 1809 painting by Charles Bell depicting opisthotonus caused by tetanus

After injection, inhalation, or ingestion, the first symptoms to appear are generalized muscle spasms. They appear very quickly after inhalation or injection – within as few as five minutes – and take somewhat longer to manifest after ingestion, typically approximately 15 minutes. With a very high dose, the onset of respiratory failure and brain death can occur in 15 to 30 minutes. If a lower dose is ingested, other symptoms begin to develop, including seizures, cramping, stiffness, hypervigilance, and agitation. Seizures caused by strychnine poisoning can start as early as 15 minutes after exposure and last 12–24 hours. They are often triggered by sights, sounds, or touch and can cause other adverse symptoms, including hyperthermia, rhabdomyolysis, myoglobinuric kidney failure, metabolic acidosis, and respiratory acidosis. During seizures, mydriasis (abnormal dilation), exophthalmos (protrusion of the eyes), and nystagmus (involuntary eye movements) may occur.

As strychnine poisoning progresses, tachycardia (rapid heart beat), hypertension (high blood pressure), tachypnea (rapid breathing), cyanosis (blue discoloration), diaphoresis (sweating), water-electrolyte imbalance, leukocytosis (high number of white blood cells), trismus (lockjaw), risus sardonicus (spasm of the facial muscles), and opisthotonus (dramatic spasm of the back muscles, causing arching of the back and neck) can occur. In rare cases, the affected person may experience nausea or vomiting.

The proximate cause of death in strychnine poisoning can be cardiac arrest, respiratory failure, multiple organ failure, or brain damage.

Minimum lethal dose estimates for strychnine in humans
| Type | Route | Dose (mg) | Ref. |
|---|---|---|---|
| Human | Oral | 100–120 | |
| Human | Oral | 30–60 | |
| Human (child) | Oral | 15 | |
| Human (adult) | Oral | 50–100 | |
| Human (adult) | Oral | 30–100 | |
| Human | Intravenous | 5–10 (approximate) | |

For occupational exposures to strychnine, the Occupational Safety and Health Administration and the National Institute for Occupational Safety and Health have set exposure limits at 0.15 mg/m^{3} over an 8-hour work day.

Because strychnine produces some of the most dramatic and painful symptoms of any known toxic reaction, strychnine poisoning is often portrayed in literature and film including authors Agatha Christie and Arthur Conan Doyle.

== Treatment ==
There is no antidote for strychnine poisoning. Strychnine poisoning demands aggressive management with early control of muscle spasms, intubation for loss of airway control, toxin removal (decontamination), intravenous hydration and potentially active cooling efforts in the context of hyperthermia as well as hemodialysis in kidney failure (strychnine has not been shown to be removed by hemodialysis). Treatment involves oral administration of activated charcoal, which adsorbs strychnine within the digestive tract; unabsorbed strychnine is removed from the stomach by gastric lavage, along with tannic acid or potassium permanganate solutions to oxidize strychnine.

=== Activated charcoal ===
Activated charcoal is a substance that can bind to certain toxins in the digestive tract and prevent their absorption into the bloodstream. The effectiveness of this treatment, as well as how long it is effective after ingestion, are subject to debate. According to one source, activated charcoal is only effective within one hour of poison being ingested, although the source does not regard strychnine specifically. Other sources specific to strychnine state that activated charcoal may be used after one hour of ingestion, depending on dose and type of strychnine-containing product. Therefore, other treatment options are generally favoured over activated charcoal.

The use of activated charcoal is considered dangerous in patients with tenuous airways or altered mental states.

=== Other treatments ===
Most other treatment options focus on controlling the convulsions that arise from strychnine poisoning. These treatments involve keeping the patient in a quiet and darkened room, anticonvulsants such as phenobarbital or diazepam, muscle relaxants such as dantrolene, barbiturates and propofol, and chloroform or heavy doses of chloral, bromide, urethane or amyl nitrite. If a poisoned person is able to survive for 6 to 12 hours subsequent to initial dose, they have a good prognosis.

The sine qua non of strychnine toxicity is the "awake" seizure, in which tonic-clonic activity occurs but the patient is alert and oriented throughout and afterwards. Accordingly, George Harley (1829–1896) showed in 1850 that curare (wourali) was effective for the treatment of tetanus and strychnine poisoning.

== Pharmacokinetics ==
=== Absorption ===
Strychnine may be introduced into the body orally, by inhalation, or by injection. It is a potently bitter substance, and in humans has been shown to activate bitter taste receptors TAS2R10 and TAS2R46. Strychnine is rapidly absorbed from the gastrointestinal tract.

=== Distribution ===
Strychnine is transported by plasma and red blood cells. Due to slight protein binding, strychnine leaves the bloodstream quickly and distributes to bodily tissues. Approximately 50% of the ingested dose can enter the tissues in 5 minutes. Also within a few minutes of ingestion, strychnine can be detected in the urine. Little difference was noted between oral and intramuscular administration of strychnine in a 4 mg dose. In persons killed by strychnine, the highest concentrations are found in the blood, liver, kidney and stomach wall. The usual fatal dose is 60–100 mg strychnine and is fatal after a period of 1–2 hours, though lethal doses vary depending on the individual.

=== Metabolism ===
Strychnine is rapidly metabolized by the liver microsomal enzyme system requiring NADPH and O_{2}. Strychnine competes with the inhibitory neurotransmitter glycine resulting in an excitatory state. However, the toxicokinetics after overdose have not been well described. In most severe cases of strychnine poisoning, the patient dies before reaching the hospital. The biological half-life of strychnine is about 10 hours.

=== Excretion ===
A few minutes after ingestion, strychnine is excreted unchanged in the urine, and accounts for about 5 to 15% of a sublethal dose given over 6 hours. Approximately 10 to 20% of the dose will be excreted unchanged in the urine in the first 24 hours. The percentage excreted decreases with the increasing dose. Of the amount excreted by the kidneys, about 70% is excreted in the first 6 hours, and almost 90% in the first 24 hours. Excretion is virtually complete in 48 to 72 hours.

== History ==
Strychnine was the first alkaloid to be identified in plants of the genus Strychnos, family Loganiaceae. Strychnos, named by Carl Linnaeus in 1753, is a genus of trees and climbing shrubs of the Gentianales order. The genus contains 196 various species and is distributed throughout the warm regions of Asia (58 species), America (64 species), and Africa (75 species). The seeds and bark of many plants in this genus contain strychnine.

The toxic and medicinal effects of Strychnos nux-vomica have been well known from the times of ancient India, although the chemical compound itself was not identified and characterized until the 19th century. The inhabitants of these countries had historical knowledge of the species Strychnos nux-vomica and Saint-Ignatius' bean (Strychnos ignatii). Strychnos nux-vomica is a tree native to the tropical forests on the Malabar Coast in Southern India, Sri Lanka and Indonesia, which attains a height of about 12 metres (39 ft). The tree has a crooked, short, thick trunk and the wood is close grained and very durable. The fruit has an orange color and is about the size of a large apple with a hard rind and contains five seeds, which are covered with a soft wool-like substance. The ripe seeds look like flattened disks, which are very hard. These seeds are the chief commercial source of strychnine and were first imported to and marketed in Europe as a poison to kill rodents and small predators. Strychnos ignatii is a woody climbing shrub of the Philippines. The fruit of the plant, known as Saint Ignatius' bean, contains as many as 25 seeds embedded in the pulp. The seeds contain more strychnine than other commercial alkaloids. The properties of S. nux-vomica and S. ignatii are substantially those of the alkaloid strychnine.

Strychnine was first discovered by French chemists Joseph Bienaimé Caventou and Pierre-Joseph Pelletier in 1818 in the Saint-Ignatius' bean. In some Strychnos plants a 9,10-dimethoxy derivative of strychnine, the alkaloid brucine, is also present. Brucine is not as poisonous as strychnine. Historic records indicate that preparations containing strychnine (presumably) had been used to kill dogs, cats, and birds in Europe as far back as 1640. It was allegedly used by convicted murderer William Palmer to kill his final victim, John Cook. It was also used during World War II by Oskar Dirlewanger against civilians.

The structure of strychnine was first determined in 1946 by Sir Robert Robinson and in 1954 this alkaloid was synthesized in a laboratory by Robert B. Woodward. This is one of the most famous syntheses in the history of organic chemistry. Both chemists won the Nobel prize (Robinson in 1947 and Woodward in 1965).

Strychnine has been used as a plot device in the author Agatha Christie's murder mysteries.

=== Usage as a drug ===
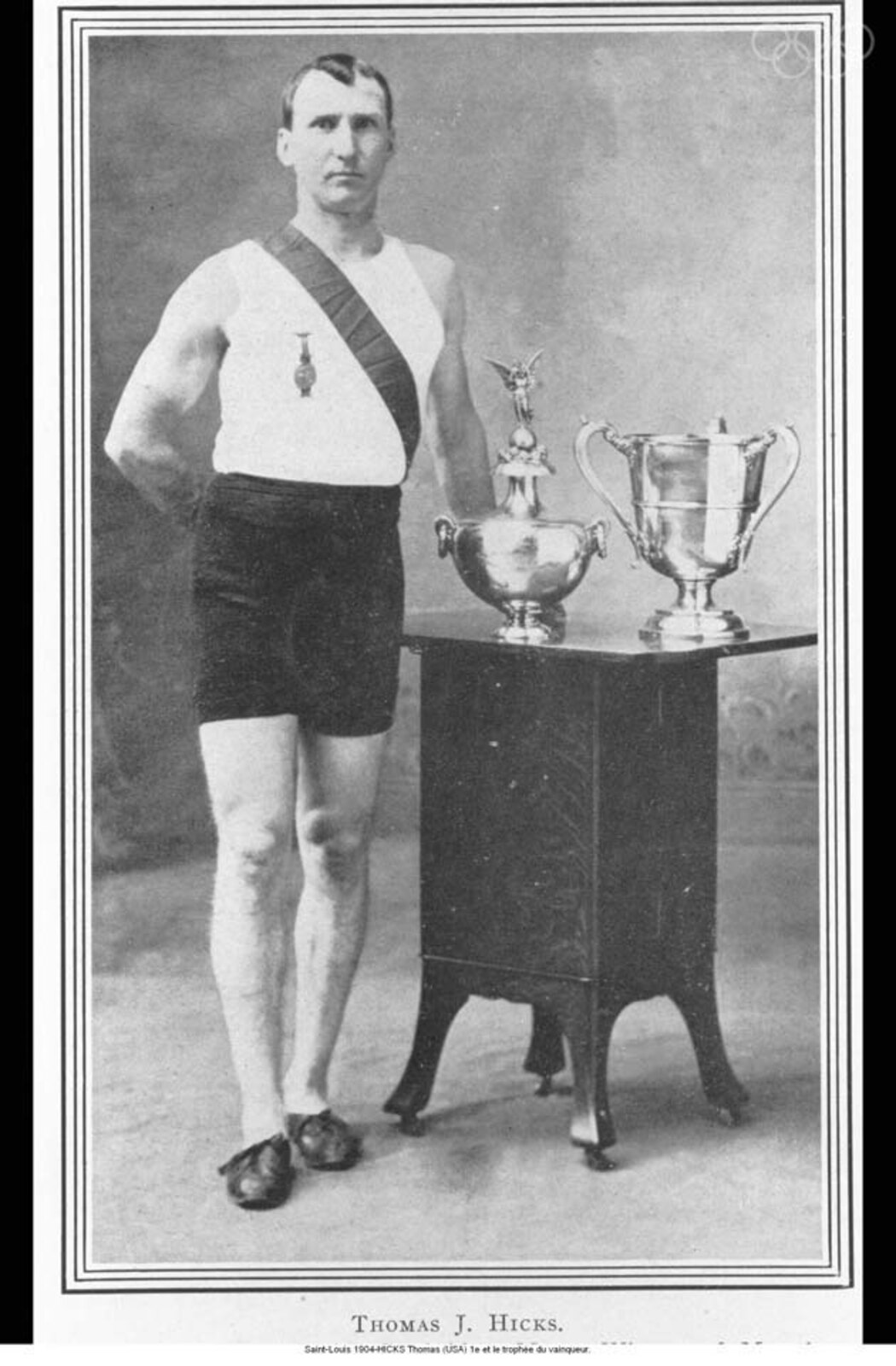
Thomas Hicks, the winner of the 1904 Olympics Men's Marathon. Hicks consumed large amounts of strychnine and brandy during the race.

Strychnine was commonly used as an athletic performance enhancer and stimulant in the late 19th century and early 20th century. The best-known incident of this usage was during the 1904 Olympics marathon, when track-and-field athlete Thomas Hicks was administered a concoction of egg whites and brandy that contained strychnine by his assistants in an attempt to boost his stamina; Hicks did not know that it contained strychnine. He proceeded to win the race.

Maximilian Theodor Buch proposed that strychnine was a cure for alcoholism.

Although strychnine has no known addictive properties, in The Invisible Man (1897), H. G. Wells imagined the protagonist, Griffin, to be a strychnine addict:

… "After a time I crawled home, took some food and a strong dose of strychnine, and went to sleep in my clothes on my unmade bed. Strychnine is a grand tonic, Kemp, to take the flabbiness out of a man."

"It's the devil," said Kemp. "It's the palaeolithic in a bottle."

"I awoke vastly invigorated and rather irritable. You know?"

"I know the stuff."

— H. G. Wells

The protagonist of Malcolm Lowry’s novel, Under the Volcano, drinks strychnine, which he calls “the old medicine,” presumably as a cure for his advanced alcoholism.

== See also ==
- Avicide
