= Brucine =

Poisonous alkaloid similar to strychnine

Names
- IUPAC name 2,3-Dimethoxystrychnidin-10-one
- Systematic IUPAC name (4bR,4b^{1}S,7aS,8aR,8a^{1}R,12aS)-2,3-Dimethoxy-4b^{1},5,6,7a,8,8a,8a^{1},11,12a,13-decahydro-14H-12-oxa-7,14a-diaza-7,9-methanocyclohepta[cd]cyclopenta[g]fluoranthen-14-one
- Other names 2,3-Dimethoxystrychnine; 10,11-Dimethoxystrychnine

Identifiers
CAS Number	357-57-3
3D model (JSmol)	Interactive image
ChEBI	CHEBI:3193
ChEMBL	ChEMBL501756
ChemSpider	390579
ECHA InfoCard	100.006.014
EC Number	206-614-7
IUPHAR/BPS	342
KEGG	C09084
PubChem CID	442021
RTECS number	EH8925000
UNII	6NG17YCK6H
UN number	1570
CompTox Dashboard (EPA)	DTXSID2024662
- InChI: InChI=1S/C23H26N2O4/c1-27-16-8-14-15(9-17(16)28-2)25-20(26)10-18-21-13-7-19-23(14,22(21)25)4-5-24(19)11-12(13)3-6-29-18/h3,8-9,13,18-19,21-22H,4-7,10-11H2,1-2H3/t13-,18-,19-,21-,22-,23+/m0/s1 Key: RRKTZKIUPZVBMF-IBTVXLQLSA-N; InChI=1/C23H26N2O4/c1-27-16-8-14-15(9-17(16)28-2)25-20(26)10-18-21-13-7-19-23(14,22(21)25)4-5-24(19)11-12(13)3-6-29-18/h3,8-9,13,18-19,21-22H,4-7,10-11H2,1-2H3/t13-,18-,19-,21-,22-,23+/m0/s1 Key: RRKTZKIUPZVBMF-IBTVXLQLBR
- SMILES: O=C7N2c1cc(OC)c(OC)cc1[C@@]64[C@@H]2[C@@H]3[C@@H](OC/C=C5\[C@@H]3C[C@@H]6N(CC4)C5)C7

Properties
Chemical formula	C_{23}H_{26}N_{2}O_{4}
Molar mass	394.471 g·mol^{−1}
Melting point	178 °C (352 °F; 451 K)

Hazards
- GHS labelling
Pictograms	(GHS06: Toxic)
Signal word	Danger
Hazard statements	H300, H330, H412
Precautionary statements	P260, P264, P270, P271, P273, P284, P301+P310, P304+P340, P310, P320, P321, P330, P403+P233, P405, P501
- Except where otherwise noted, data are given for materials in their standard state (at 25 °C [77 °F], 100 kPa). verify (what is ?) Infobox references

Brucine is an alkaloid closely related to strychnine, most commonly found in the Strychnos nux-vomica tree. Brucine poisoning is rare, since it is usually ingested with strychnine, and strychnine is more toxic than brucine. In chemical synthesis, it can be used as a tool for stereospecific chemical syntheses.

Brucine's name derives from this of the genus Brucea, named after James Bruce who brought back Brucea antidysenterica from Ethiopia.

== History ==
Brucine was discovered in 1819 by the French chemist Pelletier and the French pharmacist Caventou in the bark of the Strychnos nux-vomica tree. While its chemical structure was not deduced until much later, it was determined that it was closely related to strychnine in 1884 when the chemist Hanssen converted both strychnine and brucine into the same molecule.

== Identification ==
Brucine can be detected and quantified using liquid chromatography-mass spectrometry. Historically, brucine was distinguished from strychnine by its reactivity toward chromic acid.

== Applications ==
=== Chemical applications ===
Since brucine is a large chiral molecule, it has been used in chiral resolution. Fisher first reported its use as a resolving agent in 1899, and it was the first natural product used as an organocatalyst in a reaction resulting in an enantiomeric enrichment by Marckwald, in 1904. Its bromide salt has been used as the stationary phase in HPLC to selectively bind one of two an ionic enantiomers. Brucine has also been used for fractional crystallization in acetone to resolve dihydroxy fatty acids, as well as diarylcarbinols. If formic acid is added to a mixture of brucine and potassium nitrate, its color instantly turns red. This reaction has been used for the direct colorimetric detection of nitrates.

=== Medical applications ===
While brucine has been shown to have good anti-tumor effects, on both hepatocellular carcinoma and breast cancer, its narrow therapeutic window has limited its use as a treatment for cancer.

Brucine is also used in traditional Chinese medicine as an anti-inflammatory and analgesic agent, as well as in some Ayurveda and homeopathy drugs.

=== Alcohol denaturant ===
Brucine is one of the many chemicals used as a denaturant to make alcohol unfit for human consumption.

== Cultural references ==
One of the most famous cultural references to brucine occurs in The Count of Monte Cristo, the novel by French author Alexandre Dumas. In a discussion of mithridatism, Monte Cristo states:

Well, suppose, then, that this poison was brucine, and you were to take a milligramme the first day, two milligrams the second day, and so on … at the end of a month, when drinking water from the same carafe, you would kill the person who drank with you, without your perceiving … that there was any poisonous substance mingled with this water.

Brucine is also mentioned in the 1972 version of The Mechanic, in which the hitman Steve McKenna betrays his mentor, ageing hitman Arthur Bishop, using a celebratory glass of wine spiked with brucine, leaving Bishop to die of an apparent heart attack.

Such fictions run contrary to reality in the very properties which make brucine useful as a denaturant, and useless as a covert poison. While being only about one-eighth as toxic as strychnine, its threshold of bitterness occurs at 69 % greater dilution. A drink laden with brucine, overwhelmingly bitter at far below lethal concentration, would cause an intended victim to gag on the first sip.

== Safety ==
Brucine intoxication occurs very rarely, since it is usually ingested with strychnine. Symptoms of brucine intoxication include muscle spasms, convulsions, rhabdomyolysis, and acute kidney injury. Brucine’s mechanism of action closely resembles that of strychnine. It acts as an antagonist at glycine receptors and paralyzes inhibitory neurons.

The probable lethal dose of brucine in adults is 1 g. In other animals, the LD_{50} varies considerably.

Animal	Route of entry	LD_{50}
Mouse	Subcutaneous	60 mg/kg
Rat	Intraperitoneal	91 mg/kg
Rabbit	Oral	4 mg/kg

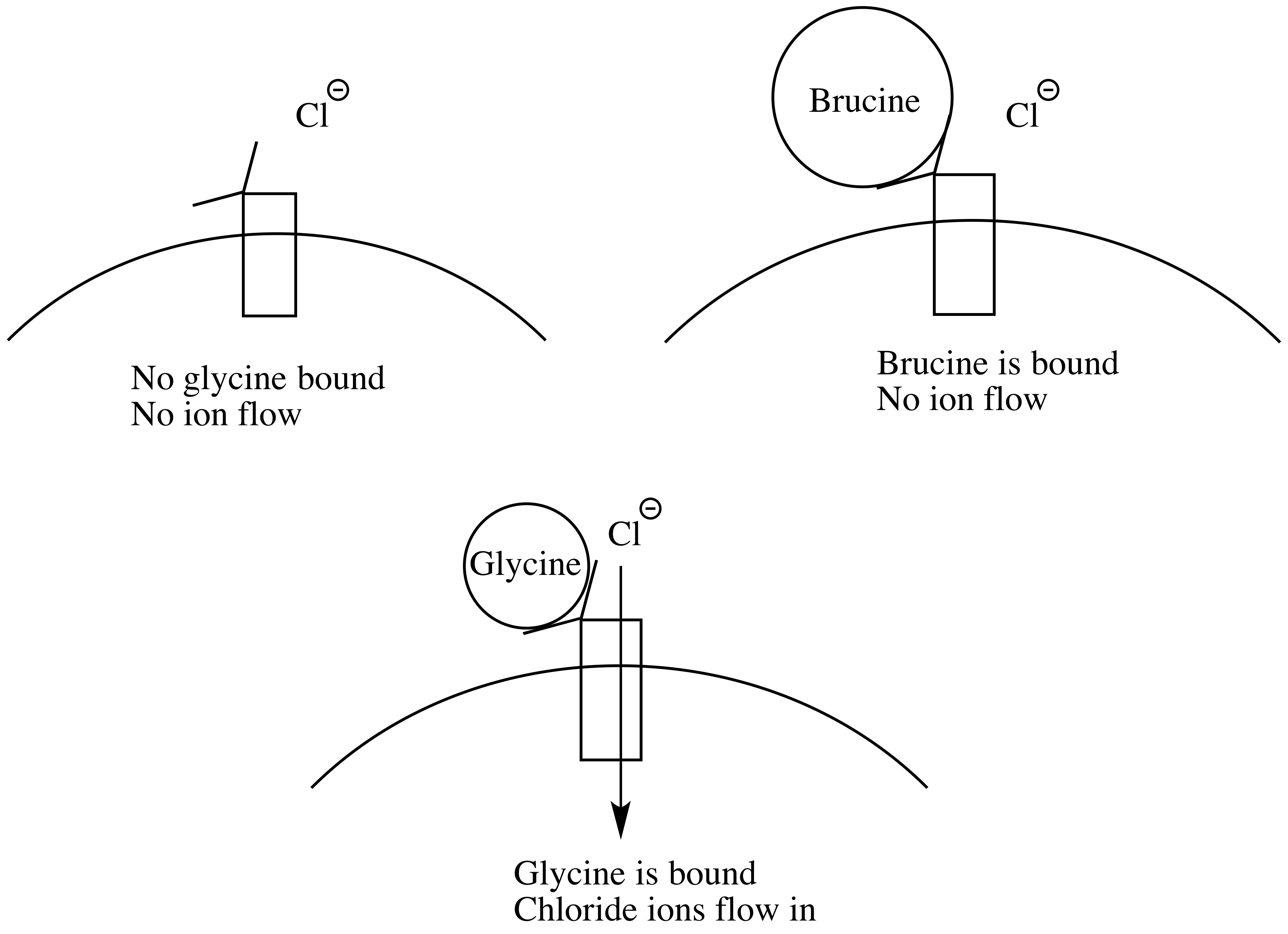
Brucine's mechanism of action
