= Mons La Hire =

Solitary lunar mountain in the western Mare Imbrium

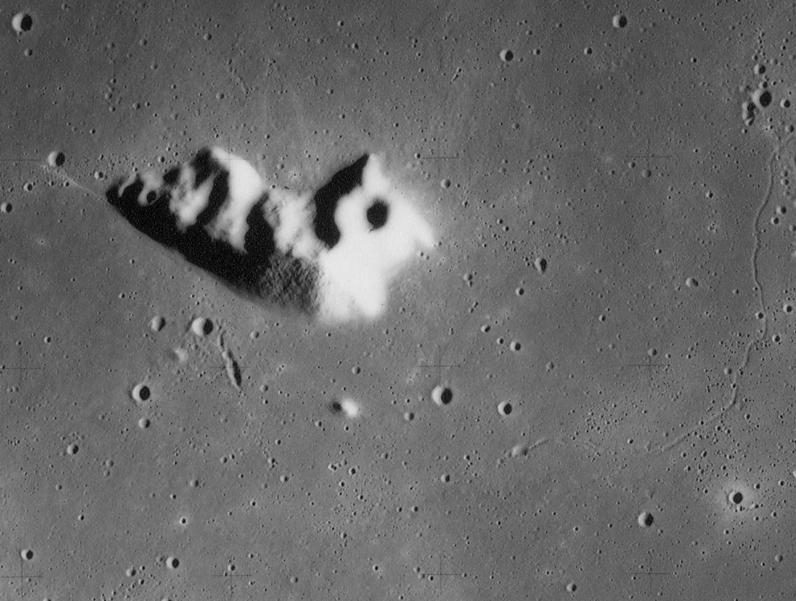
- Mons La Hire from Apollo 15. NASA photo.

Highest point
- Elevation: 1.5 km
- Listing: Lunar mountains
- Coordinates: 27.66°N 25.51°W

Naming
- Etymology: Philippe de La Hire

Geography
- Location: the Moon

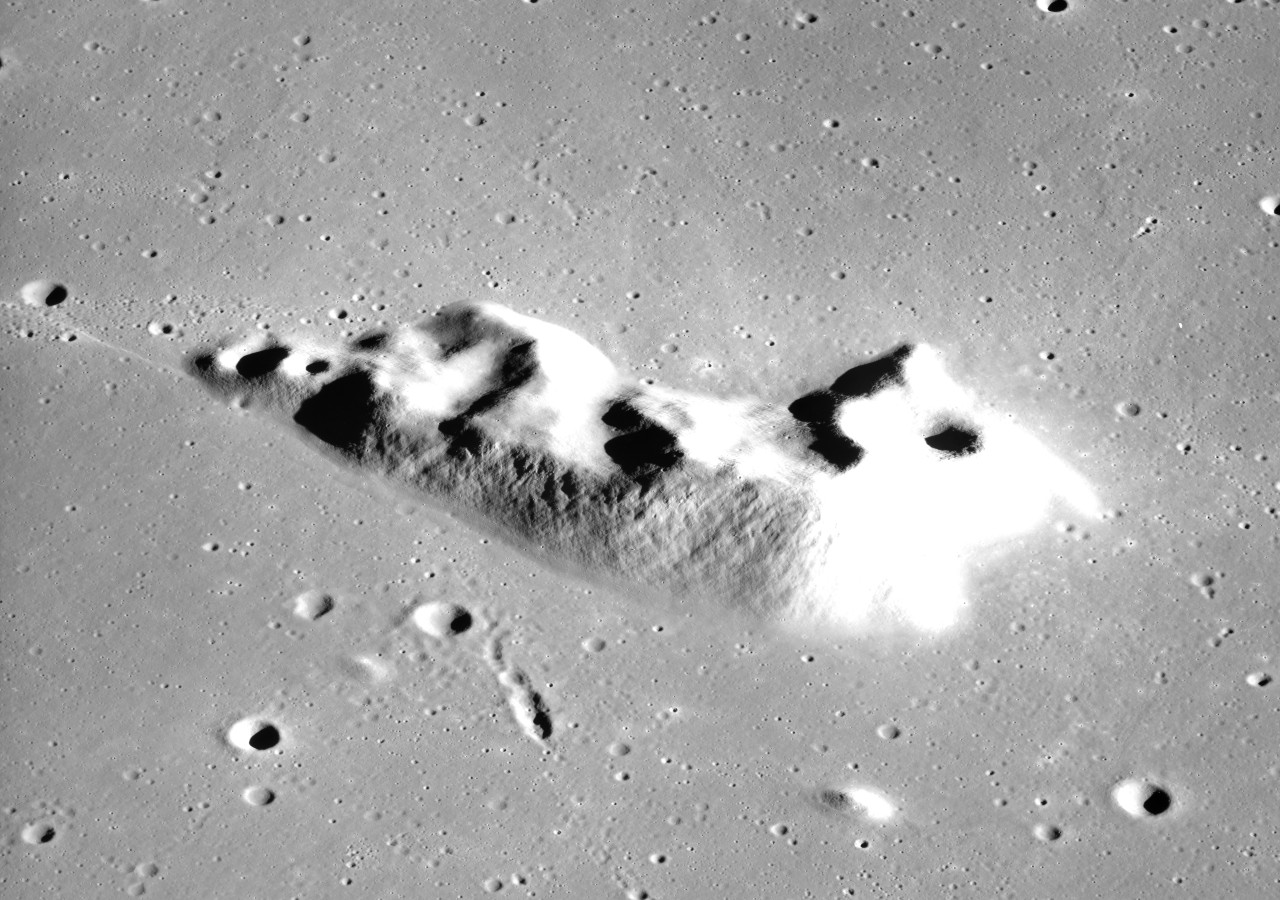
Oblique view from Apollo 17

Mons La Hire is a solitary lunar mountain in the western Mare Imbrium. It is located to the northeast of the crater Euler, and to the west-northwest of Lambert.

The selenographic coordinates of this feature are 27.8° N, 25.5° W, and it has a maximum diameter at the base of 25 km. The mountain base has a shape roughly like an arrow head, with the point oriented toward the west-northwest. The peak has a height of 1.5 km above the surface.

This feature was named after Philippe de La Hire, a French mathematician and astronomer.

== Nearby craters ==
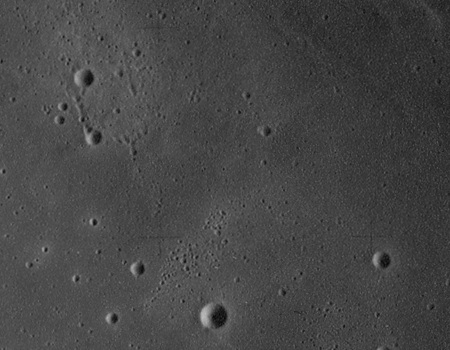
Charles (upper left corner), Mavis (below Charles), and Annegrit (lower right corner), north of Mons La Hire. The largest crater at bottom center is unnamed.

Several tiny craters near this mountain have been assigned names by the IAU. These are listed in the table below. Felix and Verne are located to the south of the peak, while the remainder are grouped to the north and northeast.

Crater	Coordinates	Diameter	Name source
Annegrit	29.4°N 25.6°W	1 km	German feminine name
Charles	29.9°N 26.4°W	1 km	French masculine name
Felix	25.1°N 25.4°W	1 km	Latin masculine name
Mavis	29.8°N 26.4°W	1 km	Scottish feminine name
Verne	24.9°N 25.3°W	2 km	Latin masculine name

== Satellite craters ==
By convention these features are identified on lunar maps by placing the letter on the side of the crater midpoint that is closest to Mons La Hire.

La Hire	Coordinates	Diameter, km
A	28.53°N 23.46°W	5
B	27.69°N 23.03°W	4

La Hire A is on the northeast side, and La Hire B on the southwest side of Dorsum Zirkel, a 193-km long wrinkle ridge.

The following craters have been renamed by the IAU.

- La Hire D — See Caventou (crater).

== See also ==
- List of mountains on the Moon
