= Pierre Joseph Pelletier =

French chemist (1788–1842)

Pierre-Joseph Pelletier
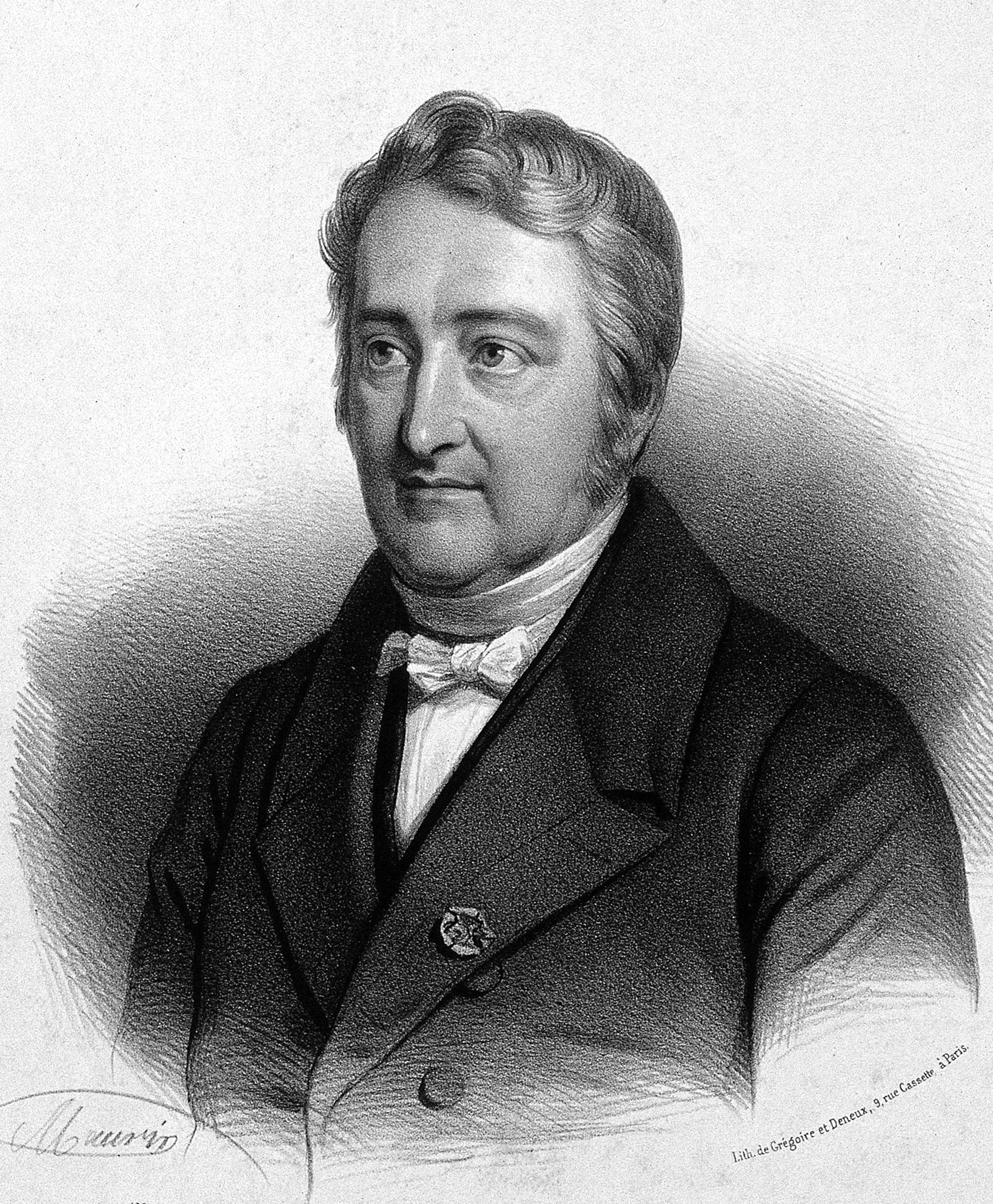
- Pierre Joseph Pelletier
- Born: 22 March 1788
- Died: 19 July 1842 (aged 54)
- Known for: alkaloids, quinine and strychnine
- Scientific career
- Fields: chemistry, pharmacy
- Thesis: Essai sur la nature des substances connues sous le nom de gommes résines (1812)

Pierre-Joseph Pelletier (UK: /ˈpɛlətieɪ/ PEL-ə-tee-ay, US: /ˌpɛləˈtjeɪ/ PEL-ə-TYAY, French: [pjɛʁ ʒozɛf pɛltje]; 22 March 1788 – 19 July 1842) was a French chemist and pharmacist who did notable research on vegetable alkaloids, and was the co-discoverer with Joseph Bienaimé Caventou of quinine, caffeine, and strychnine. He was also a collaborator and co-author with Polish chemist Filip Walter.

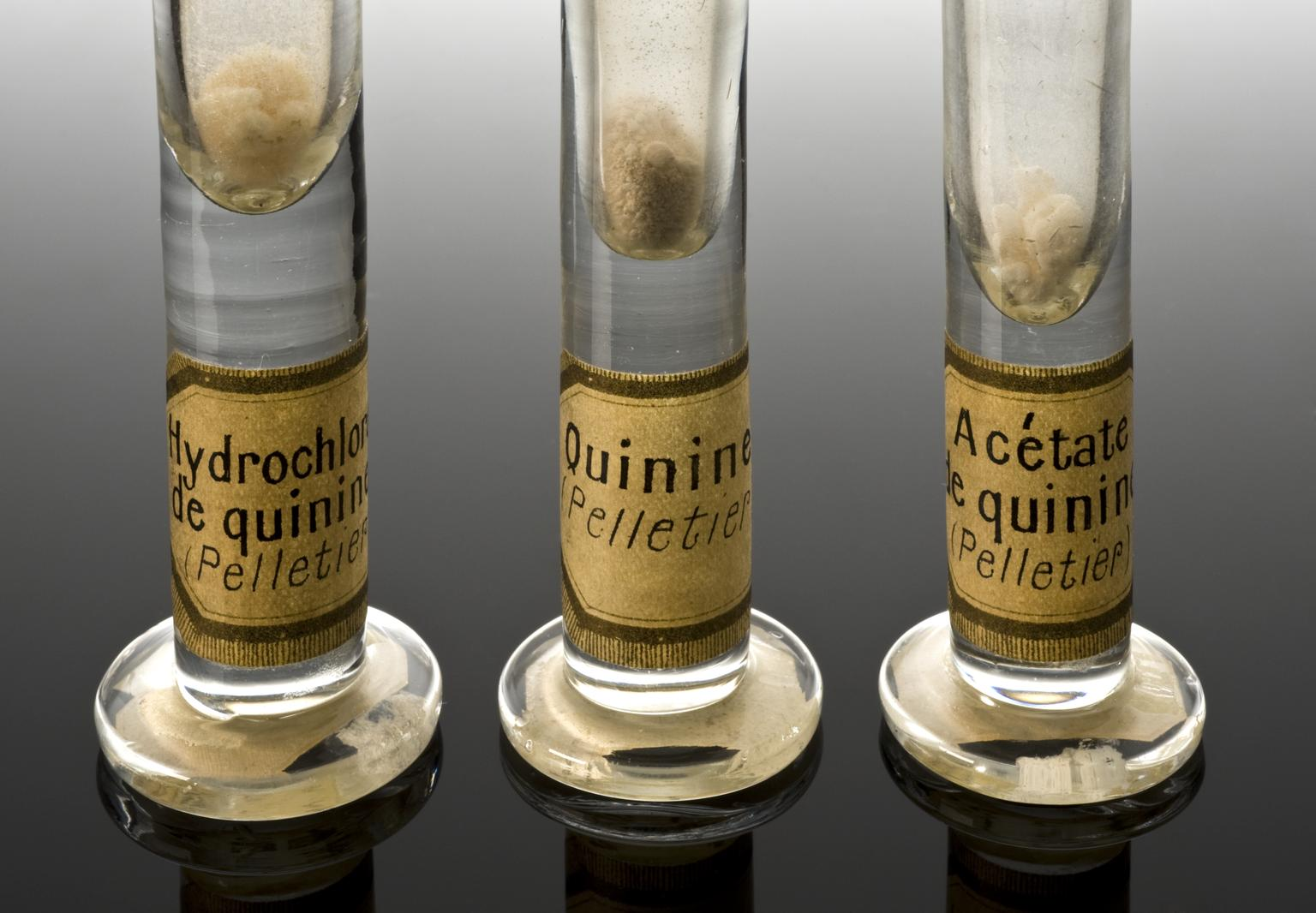
Original preparation of quinine acetate by Pelletier, 1810-1840

== See also ==
- Joseph Bienaimé Caventou
- Filip Nariusz Walter
