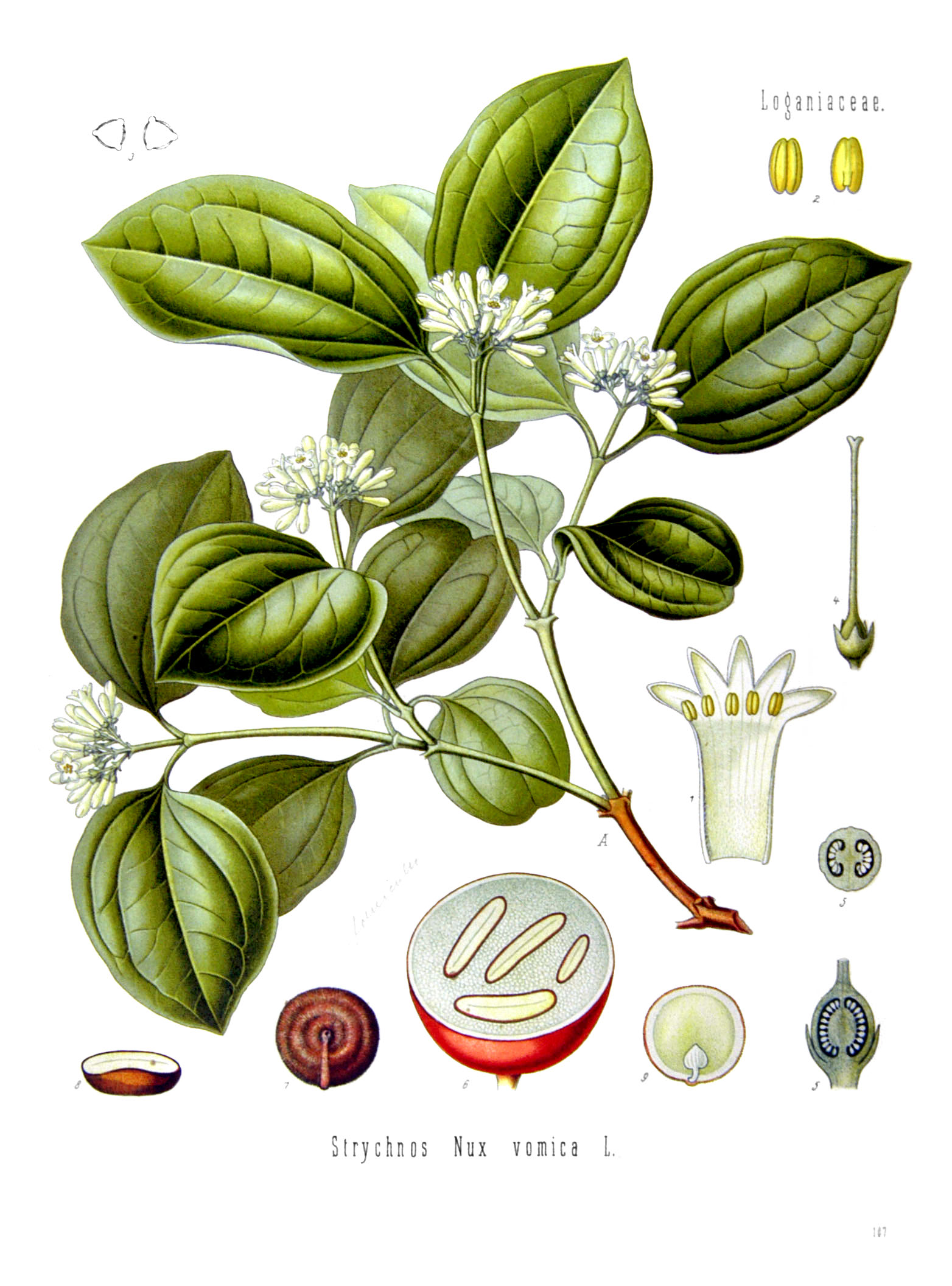
- Illustration from Köhler's Medizinal-Pflanzen
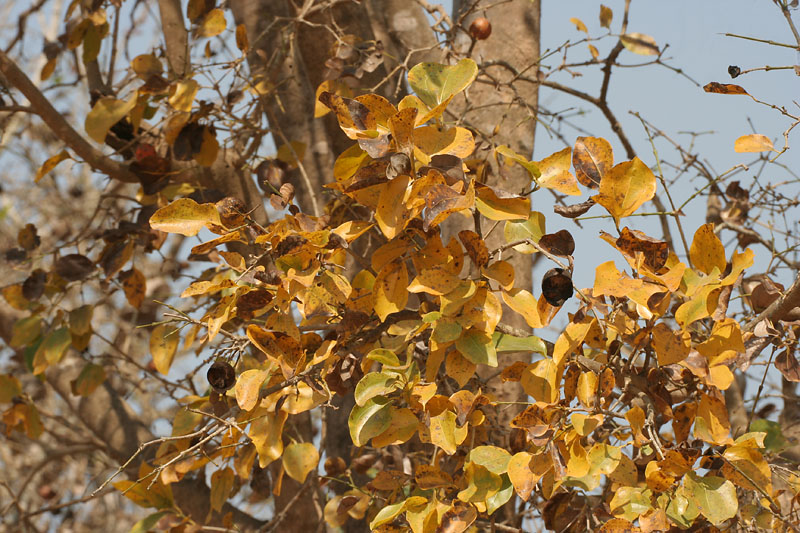
- Habitus

Scientific classification
- Kingdom: Plantae
- Clade: Tracheophytes
- Clade: Angiosperms
- Clade: Eudicots
- Clade: Asterids
- Order: Gentianales
- Family: Loganiaceae
- Genus: Strychnos
- Species: S. nux-vomica

Binomial name
- Strychnos nux-vomica L.

Synonyms
- Strychnos nux-vomica var. oligosperma Dop; Strychnos spireana Dop

= Strychnos nux-vomica =

Species of plant

Strychnos nux-vomica, the strychnine tree, also known as nux vomica, poison fruit, semen strychnos, and quaker buttons, is a deciduous tree native to India and to southeast Asia. It is a medium-sized tree in the family Loganiaceae that grows in open habitats. Its leaves are ovate and 5–9 centimetres (2–3.5 in) in size. It is known for being the natural source of the extremely poisonous compound strychnine.

== Description and properties ==
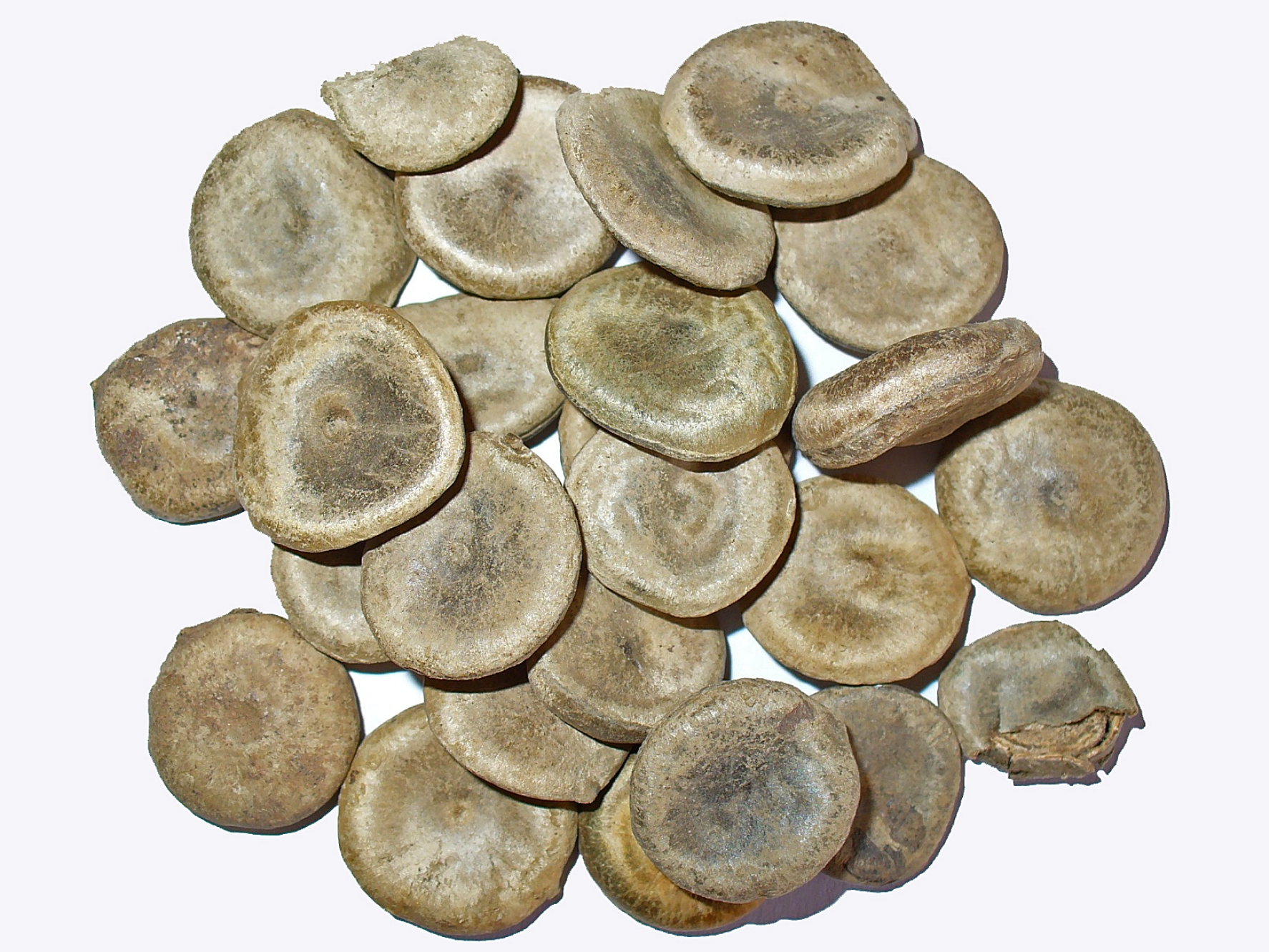
Seeds of S. nux-vomica

Strychnos nux-vomica is a medium-sized tree with a potential height of 20 metres (66 feet). Its trunk is short and thick. The wood is dense, hard, white, and close-grained. The branches are irregular and are covered with a smooth ashen bark. The young shoots are a deep green colour with a shiny coat. The leaves have an opposite decussate arrangement (each opposing pair of leaves at right angles to the next pair along the stem), are short stalked and oval shaped, have a shiny coat, and are smooth on both sides. The leaves are about 10 centimetres (4 inches) long and 7.6 cm (3 in) wide. The flowers are small with a pale green colour and a funnel shape. They bloom in the cold season and have a foul smell. The fruit are about the size of a large apple with a smooth and hard shell that when ripened is a mild shade of orange in colour. The flesh of the fruit is soft and white with a jelly-like pulp containing five seeds covered with a soft, woolly substance.

The seeds have the shape of a flattened disk completely covered with hairs radiating from the center of the sides. This gives the seeds a very characteristic sheen. The seeds are very hard, with a dark gray horny endosperm where the small embryo is housed that gives off no odor but possesses a very bitter taste.

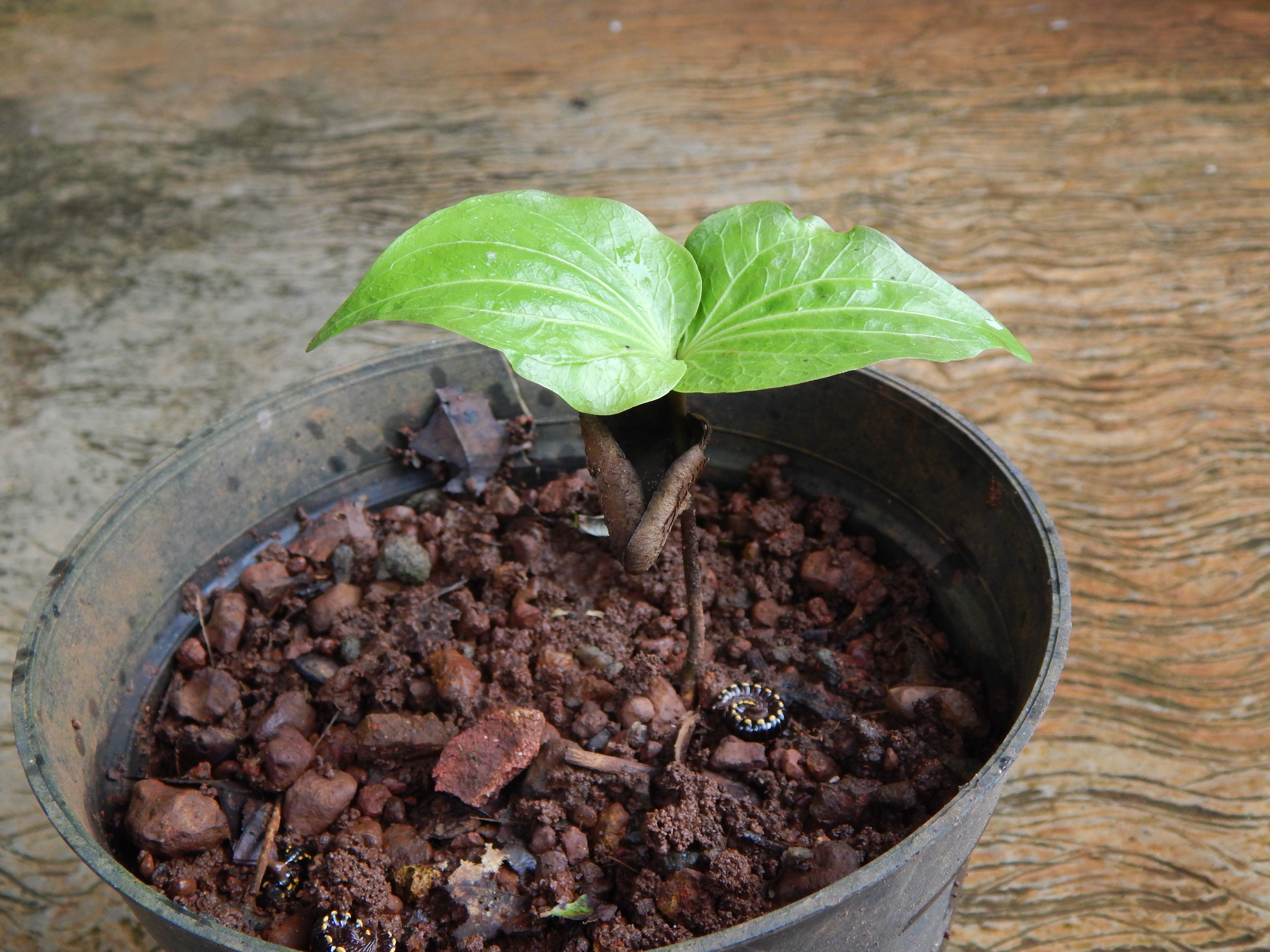
Seedling of nux vomica

== Ecology ==
The pulp of the fruit is eaten by monkeys and birds. It is also eaten by at least one species of Hornbill, the Malabar pied hornbill

== Toxicity ==
The seeds within the round, green to orange fruit of the tree are a major source of the highly poisonous, intensely bitter alkaloids strychnine and brucine. The seeds contain approximately 1.5% strychnine, and the dried blossoms contain 1.0%. However, the bark of the tree also contains brucine and other poisonous compounds.

== Uses ==
The strychnine-containing seeds have been used in arrow poison. The use of strychnine is highly regulated in many countries, and it is mostly used in baits to kill feral mammals. Most accidental poisoning is caused by breathing in the powder or by absorption through the skin.

=== Herbalism ===
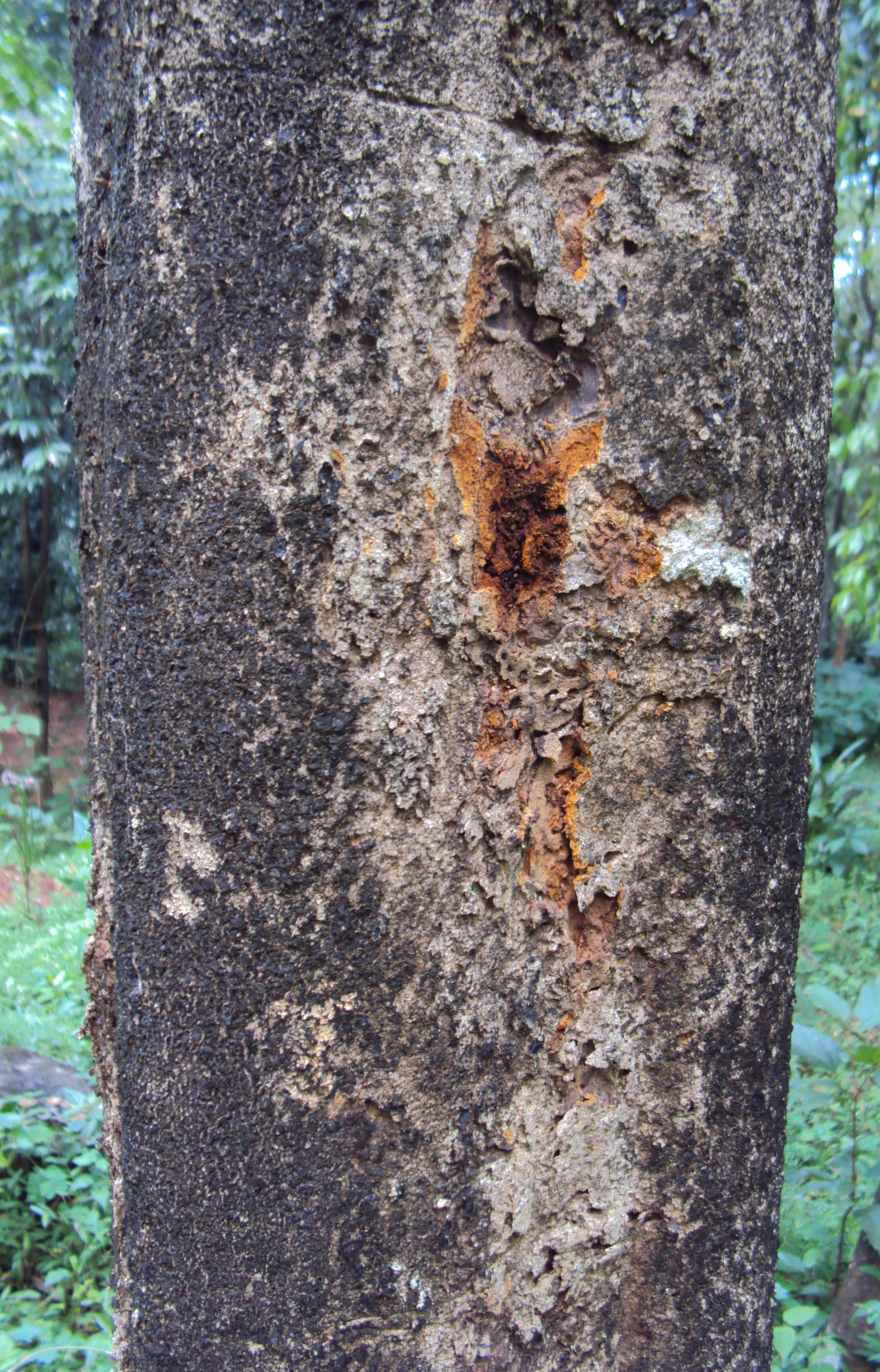
Bark of Strychnos nux-vomica

Strychnos is promoted within herbal medicine as being a treatment for a wide range of maladies, including cancer and heart disease, as an alternative to digitalis. There is, however, no evidence it is useful for treating any condition. Indeed, these seeds contain strychnine. The plant appears on the Commission E list of unapproved herbs because it has not been proven to be safe or effective and thus is not recommended for use. Use of strychnine seeds for such purposes may prove fatal, as it has no safe limit for consumption.

In Unani medicine (Perso-Arabic traditional medicine), hudar is a mixture containing Strychnos nux-vomica. The seeds are first immersed in water for five days and then in milk for two days followed by their boiling in milk.

The level of toxic alkaloids in the unprocessed Strychnos seeds used in traditional medicines can be determined using established HPLC methods and HPLC-UV methods.
