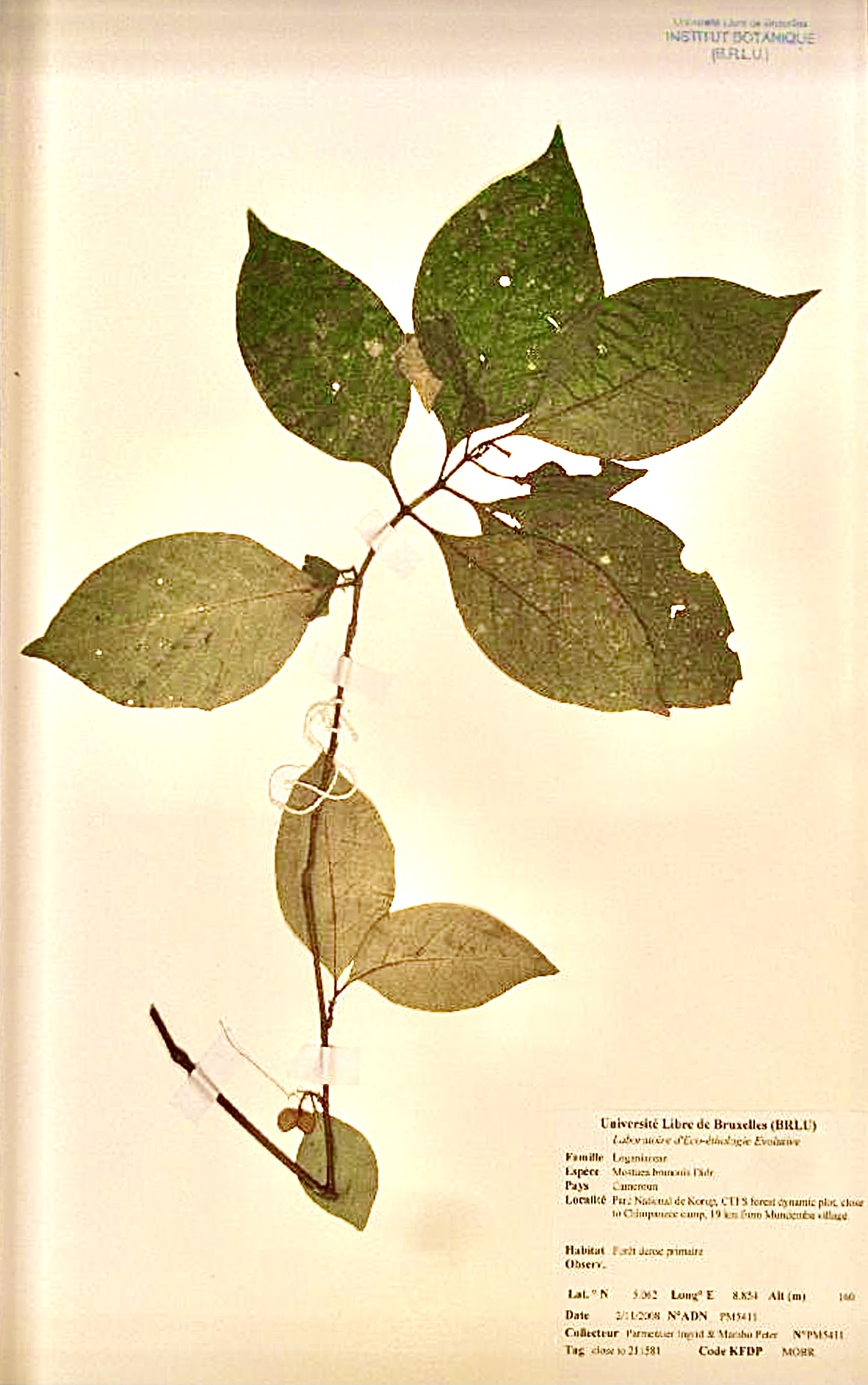
- Mostuea brunonis (herbarium specimen)

Scientific classification
- Kingdom: Plantae
- Clade: Tracheophytes
- Clade: Angiosperms
- Clade: Eudicots
- Clade: Asterids
- Order: Gentianales
- Family: Gelsemiaceae
- Genus: Mostuea; Didr.

Synonyms
- Coinochlamys T.Anderson ex Benth. & Hook.f.; Leptocladus Oliv.

= Mostuea =

Genus of plants

Mostuea is one of only three genera of flowering plants belonging to the small family Gelsemiaceae (the other two being Gelsemium and Pteleocarpa). Mostuea and Gelsemium were formerly placed in the family Loganiaceae, while Pteleocarpa was placed variously in the families Icacinaceae, Cardiopteridaceae, Boraginaceae, and others, before the description of the Gelsemiaceae was altered formally to accommodate it in 2014. Mostuea is native to Africa and South America. Anecdotal evidence suggests that the roots of certain Mostuea species are used as ritual aphrodisiacs and entheogens in West Tropical Africa.

== Taxonomy ==
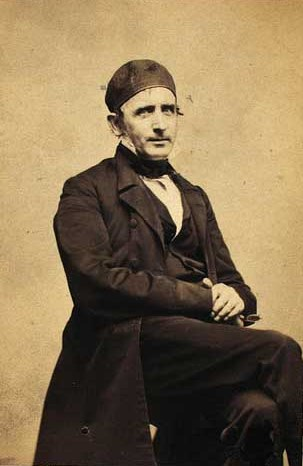
Danish botanist and physicist Didrik Ferdinand Didrichsen, publisher of the genus Mostuea.

The genus was described by Didrik Ferdinand Didrichsen and published in Denmark in Videnskabelige Meddelelser fra Dansk Naturhistorisk Forening i Kjøbenhavn (translation: Scientific Announcements from the Danish Society for Natural History in Copenhagen) 1853: 86. 1853.2. It is named in honour of the Danish botanist Jens Laurentius (Lorenz) Moestue Vahl (1796–1854), son of the botanist Martin Vahl. The type species is Mostuea brunonis Didr.

== Description ==
Small shrubs, undershrubs or, less commonly, lianas, between 20 cm and 2m in height/length, having much-branched stems and slender twigs, these being either glabrous or clothed in simple trichomes. Leaves opposite with short petioles and blades ovate to very narrowly elliptic, variable in shape and size (often smaller in size on lateral branches) entire or with margins somewhat sinuate–dentate, veins pinnate and conspicuous. Inflorescence axillary or terminal, many-flowered, usually on short lateral branches. Flower: five-merous, dimorphic, corolla funnel-shaped, white, sometimes pale yellow, orange, or red, yellow at the base or not, 2·5 to 9 times as long as the calyx; tube approx 3 to 5 times as long as the lobes; corolla aestivation imbricate, corolla lobes spreading, orbicular or nearly so, rounded, entire or sometimes slightly sinuate–dentate. Fruit a capsule, obcordate (heart-shaped, the point attached to the pedicel), bilobed or occasionally ellipsoid, flattened, with an impressed line in the middle, loculicidal (septa remain intact at maturity), 4–valved; valves hinging on the septum; cells with 1–2 seeds.

== Species ==
Kew's Plants of the World Online website recognises the following ten species.

- Mostuea adamii Sillans – Africa: Guinea, Liberia, Sierra Leone
- Mostuea batesii Baker (syn. M. stimulans) – Africa: Cameroon, Gabon, Zaïre
- Mostuea brunonis Didr. (including M. walleri) – Africa (widespread), Madagascar
- Mostuea hirsuta (T. Anderson ex Benth. & Hook. f.) Baill. – Africa (widespread)
- Mostuea hymenocardioides Hutch. & Dalziel – Africa: Guinea, Sierra Leone
- Mostuea microphylla Gilg – Africa: Democratic Republic of Congo, Kenya, Mozambique, S. Somalia, Tanzania and Zaire
- Mostuea muricata Sobral & Lc. Rossi – Southeast and west-central Brazil
- Mostuea neurocarpa Gilg – Africa: Cameroon, Congo, Gabon
- Mostuea rubrinervis Engl. – Africa: SE. Kenya to E. Tanzania
- Mostuea surinamensis Benth. – Northern Brazil and Suriname

== Toxicity and use in traditional medicine ==
As might readily be expected of a close relative of the notoriously toxic genus Gelsemium, the genus Mostuea encompasses toxic, alkaloidal species with a variety of ethnobotanical applications as poisons and folk medicines.

- Mostuea brunonis: the young leaves are eaten to treat stomach ailments. Preparations of the twigs and leaves are said to have analgesic effects upon body (muscular ?) pains and intestinal pain and to be beneficial in cases of colitis and dysentery. The root decoction or infusion is considered to be effective as an aphrodisiac, an anthelmintic, an analgesic and a treatment for colds, yellow fever and kidney disease. The roots are chewed to treat stomach pain, the crushed roots are applied topically to treat wounds and snake bites and the root bark is used as an ingredient in arrow poisons.
- Mostuea batesii (syn. M. stimulans): the root bark is considered a powerful stimulant and aphrodisiac, antimalarial and antileishmanial, while a decoction of the root bark is administered to children as an anthelmintic. Both the roots and stem bark are considered psychoactive (stimulant and hallucinogenic), aphrodisiac and antipyretic. Also used in magic and ritual, including initiation rites.

== Hallucinogen ==
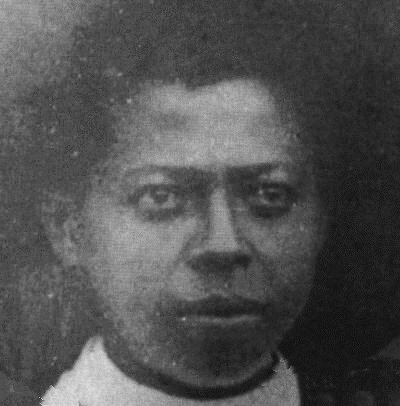
Father André Raponda-Walker, the scholar who first drew the attention of the scientific community to the use of Mostuea spp. as entheogens.

De Smet (1996) provides a short, but nonetheless informative overview of the (almost exclusively French) accounts of the use of Mostuea as a ceremonial entheogen with iboga-like aphrodisiac effects. He notes that the first accounts of the psychoactive properties of Mostuea in the scientific literature are to be found in two papers by French botanist, taxonomist and explorer Auguste Chevalier (1873–1956) published in 1946 and 1947. Chevalier's informant was the Catholic priest and renowned authority on Gabonese language and culture, Father André Raponda-Walker (1871–1968), who later included information on Mostuea in his own collaborative work of 1961 (with Roger Sillans) on the ethnobotany of Gabon. Chevalier reported that the inhabitants of the Gabonese region in the vicinity of the Fernan Vaz Lagoon (Ogooué-Maritime Province) made ceremonial use of a certain root known as Sata mbwanda in Nkomi (one of the Myene languages) and Sété mbwundè in Bakole.

"This root" (writes Father Walker) "is considered to possess an action comparable to those of Tabernanthe iboga and Schumanniophyton. It is a potent aphrodisiac and also a stimulant. During nights set aside for dancing, the Blacks chew the roots, whole or grated, to drive away sleep. But the majority consume them during their dances - either on their own or mixed with Iboga - for the sexual excitement which they cause. Excessive use of this drug can lead to cerebral troubles". [translated from the French of Auguste Chevalier]

Chevalier notes that two species of Mostuea were used in the practices described above: M. stimulans ( - Latin stimulans = "stimulating" - now known correctly as M. batesii) and M. gabonica (now M. hirsuta), but that the former was used more frequently. He then proceeds to describe in detail roots of M. batesii which he had received and which, it is apparent from his description, were dried, unlike the fresh ones referenced by Raponda-Walker.

They are straight or zigzag in form, sometimes even corkscrew-shaped, of a brown colour, 15 to 25cm long, more or less branched and ending in slender rootlets; the biggest have about the thickness of a pencil (5mm in diameter) in the upper part, but very thin at the tip. The root bark is thin (1 to 1.5 mm thick) and difficult to peel off. The outer root bark is greyish-brown and wrinkled longitudinally while the inner bark...is of a whiteish grey. When wetted, it takes on a shade of white tinged with ochre or pink. Chewed whole, or reduced to powder before being placed in the mouth, the flavour of the root is very bitter at first but, after causing some salivation, becomes reminiscent of chewed kola nut. Thereafter, it causes a certain euphoria and, if the dose taken be rather strong, a sort of inebriation.

=== Parallels with hallucinogen-like effects of Gelsemium ===
In the second edition of their classic work on plant-derived psychotropic drugs The Botany and Chemistry of Hallucinogens Richard Evans Schultes and Albert Hofmann place Gelsemium sempervirens in a short appendix consisting simply of a list of the names of plants of dubious hallucinogenic use (the third and lowest level of confidence in their system of classification). The basis for such a placement rests on occasional references in the literature to instances of the use of Gelsemium sempervirens in contexts reminiscent of the use of a psychotropic drug. One such example ( - that invites comparison with Raponda-Walker's comments on Gabonese use of the related Mostuea - ) is to be found in Louis Lewin's early 20th century classic Phantastica:

during a severe attack of rheumatism a man took a large quantity of an alcoholic tincture of Gelsemium sempervirens a plant which is liable to act on the brain and the medulla oblongata. Noticing an appreciable result he continued to take it, and finally became a slave to the drug. He gradually augmented the quantity, and reached 30 gr. of the tincture in one dose. Slowly he became pale, agitated, and discontented. He wasted away. Hallucination set in, and his state grew worse until disorders of the intelligence appeared. As he continued to increase the doses he fell into idiocy and died in a state of mental confusion.

Lewin's "disorders of the intelligence" manifested in the later stages of the victim's Gelsemium addiction recall immediately Raponda-Walker's "Excessive use of this drug [Mostuea] can lead to cerebral troubles". Furthermore, while there is no mention in Lewin's account of Mostuea-like sexual excitation, there is mention of "agitation" recalling wakefulness / stimulation, and "hallucination". The full-blown addiction, ["became a slave to the drug"] suggests not merely the victim's relief from his rheumatic pain, but some pleasurable effect [compare Raponda-Walker's "euphoria" induced by a moderate dose of Mostuea root].

=== In the wider context of entheogens used in indigenous Gabonese religions ===
Like several other hallucinogenic plants used in the spiritual practices of Gabon, such as Bwiti, Mostuea has languished in the shadow of the more celebrated drug Iboga, derived from the Apocynaceous shrub Tabernanthe iboga (as late as the 1960s, itself an obscure psychotropic - although now enjoying a new-found celebrity as a treatment for a variety of addictions - notably addiction to heroin). Raponda-Walker's account reveals certain problems inherent in the study of Mostuea: not only are the reported effects similar to those of Iboga, but the drug is (or was) often consumed with Iboga, such that a measure of confusion could easily arise as to which drug were responsible for the wakefulness and sexual arousal observed in the participants in Gabonese dance rites. It is also unclear if Mostuea is a true hallucinogen: in contrast to Iboga - which can evoke strong and colourful visions - there is no overt mention in the literature of such visual phenomena in Mostuea intoxication. Raponda-Walker likens the effects of Mostuea to those of Iboga which might - or might not - be understood to mean that it can cause visual hallucinations in addition to acting as a sleep-dispelling stimulant and aphrodisiac (in lower doses Iboga is used as stimulant - e.g. by lion-hunters who must remain alert and immobile for days on end - and also as a powerful aphrodisiac). Chevalier speaks only of "euphoria" and "a sort of inebriation" inviting comparison to opiate or alcohol intoxication rather than any visionary state.

== Chemistry ==
As of 1996 the only chemical and pharmacological evaluation of the genus Mostuea which had been undertaken was that of Paris and Moyse-Mignan, carried out upon M. batesii (as M. stimulans) in 1949. These researchers found the alkaloid content of the leafy twigs to be a meagre 0.06% - compared with 0.15% in the entire roots and a more substantial 0.33% in the root bark (in keeping with reports that it was the roots and not the aerial parts of the plant that featured in Gabonese ritual use). Two of the alkaloids present in the root bark bore some resemblance to Gelsemium alkaloids: one showed similarities to sempervirine, while the other exhibited certain properties similar to those of gelsemine. In neither case, however, was a definitive identification made. Quattrocchi noted in 2012 that the terpenoid indole alkaloid camptothecin (better known as an active constituent of Camptotheca acuminata, Nyssaceae) had been isolated from the widespread species Mostuea brunonis, which shares at least the aphrodisiac properties attributed in folk medicine to M. batesii. A recent study found Mostuea brunonis to contain several indole alkaloids. The stems and leaves yielded gelsemicine, mostueine and some related compounds and the roots sempervirine and (as noted above by Quattrocchi) the quinoline-based alkaloid camptothecin.
