= Victor A. Reko =

Austrian teacher and ethnobiologist

- Born: 3 August 1880; Vienna, Austria
- Other name: Viktor Aloisius Reko

Viktor Aloisius Reko (born 3 August 1880 in Vienna) was an Austrian teacher and scientific author who moved to Mexico in 1921. He is best known for his popular book Magische Gifte: Rausch- und Betäubungsmittel der Neuen Welt ("Magic Poisons: Inebriating and Narcotic Substances of the New World"), first published in 1936 by Ferdinand Enke Verlag in Stuttgart/Germany. This book recorded a number of second-hand observations on New World psychoactive drugs, paraphrased from notes he took of conversations with his cousin, the eminent Mexican ethnobotanist Blas Pablo Reko, including the first published refutation of William Edwin Safford's uncharacteristically untenable assertion that teonanácatl was not a mushroom, but a cactus.

Reko's book also covered the following drugs, many of which were not mentioned in the earlier book Phantastica by Louis Lewin: sinicuichi (Heimia spp.) for which he claimed psychoactivity, Ololiúqui (Turbina corymbosa), peyotl (Lophophora williamsii), marihuana (Cannabis sativa), toloachi (Datura stramonium var. tatula), ayahuasca, colorines (Erythrina and Sophora species), coztic-zapote (Pouteria campechiana), xomil-xihuite (Gelsemium sempervirens), camotillo (Dioscorea composita), and cohombrillo (Ecballium elaterium). The second edition also contained chicalote (supposedly obtained from a cross between Argemone mexicana and Papaver somniferum), minapatli (Sebastiania pavoniana, Mexican jumping bean), and herbas locas (Dioon edule, Astragalus amphyoxys, and Oxytropis lambertii).

The author wrote 1936 in his introduction of "Magische Gifte...":

"Die vorliegende Veröffentlichung will etwas Licht in das Dunkel bringen, das alle diese wenig erforschten Giftdrogen umgibt. In zwölf ausgewählten Kapiteln (die ebenso leicht auf zwanzig oder mehr hätten vermehrt werden können) wird eine Anzahl betäubender Genußmittel geschildert, die, wie vor wenigen Jahren Koka, aus Kreisen niedriger Rassen ihren Weg in Kulturvölker zu nehmen drohen. Sache der Psychiater und Kriminologen wird es sein, dies zu vehindern. Wenn mein Buch dazu beiträgt, dieses Ziel zu erreichen, ist es nicht umsonst geschrieben worden. D e r V e r f a s s e r. "

Victor A. Reko became a member of the Mexican Academy of Sciences.

== See also ==
- Blas Pablo Reko
- Louis Lewin, author of Phantastica
