= Pteleocarpa =

Scientific classification
- Kingdom: Plantae
- Clade: Tracheophytes
- Clade: Angiosperms
- Clade: Eudicots
- Clade: Asterids
- Order: Gentianales
- Family: Gelsemiaceae
- Genus: Pteleocarpa; Oliv., 1873
- Species: P. lamponga

Binomial name
- Pteleocarpa lamponga (Miq.) Bakh. ex Karel Heyne 1927

Synonyms
- Dodonaea lamponga Miquel 1861; Pteleocarpa malaccensis Oliver 1873; Pteleocarpa longistyla Beccari 1877

Species of plant

Pteleocarpa is a genus of flowering plants. The only member of the genus is the western Malesian tree Pteleocarpa lamponga. It has had a varied systematic history and has been placed in the families Icacinaceae, Cardiopteridaceae, Boraginaceae, and others. It has long been regarded as enigmatic. For example, its winged fruit is quite odd within the family Boraginaceae, where it was usually placed in the 2000s. The family name Pteleocarpaceae had been used, but was not validly published until 2011, when the required description was published in Kew Bulletin. A morphological study of Pteleocarpa was published in 2014. Also in 2014, a molecular phylogenetic study of the lamiids (a.k.a. Garryidae) sampled Pteleocarpa and resolved it as sister to Gelsemiaceae. Both genera of Gelsemiaceae (Gelsemium and Mostuea) were sampled and this result had maximum statistical support in three different methods of cladistic analysis. The authors of that study recommended that Pteleocarpa be included in Gelsemiaceae. This was formally done in 2014 by altering the description of the family to accommodate it. In the APG IV system published in 2016, Pteleocarpa is included in Gelsemiaceae.

== Sources ==
- Miller, JS (2003) Classification of Boraginaceae subfam. Ehretioideae: resurrection of the genus Hilsenbergia Tausch ex Meisn. Adansonia, sér. 3, 25: 151-189.
- Patel, RN & Bowles, A (1978) Wood anatomy of the dicotyledons indigenous to New Zealand, 12. Icacinaceae. New Zealand Journal of Botany 16: 7-12.
