= G. elegans =

G. elegans may refer to:

- Gelsemium elegans, a shrub species in the genus Gelsemium native to Asia
- Geochelone elegans, the Indian star tortoise, a tortoise species found in dry areas and scrub forest in India and Sri Lanka
- Globocassidulina elegans, a species of marine foraminifera found in the Japanese and New Zealand Exclusive Economic Zones
- Gymnothamnion elegans, a red alga species found in South Africa
- Gypsophila elegans, the annual baby's-breath or showy baby's-breath, an ornamental plant species native to Asia and Europe

== Synonyms ==
- Galipea elegans, a synonym for Conchocarpus elegans, a plant species found in Brazil
