= Monique Simmonds =

English botanist, Royal Gardens Kew

- Born: Monique Sheelagh Jacquard Simmonds; February 1950 (age 76)
- Education: University of Leeds (BSc); Birkbeck College (PhD)

Monique Sheelagh Jacquard Simmonds OBE (born February 1950) is a British chemist and botanist who is deputy keeper of the Jodrell Laboratory at the Royal Botanic Gardens, Kew. She has been involved in identifying plant-derived compounds in several criminal investigations. She is a Fellow of the Royal Entomological Society and the Royal Society of Biology.

== Life ==
Simmonds earned her BSc at the University of Leeds and her PhD in parasitology at Birkbeck College, University of London. Her doctoral thesis was on the subject of the parasitoids of synanthropic flies.

Simmonds is deputy keeper of the Jodrell Laboratory at the Royal Botanic Gardens, Kew, and Director of the Commercial Innovation Unit. She is also Deputy Director of Science - Partnerships. She has worked at Kew Gardens since 1985. Simmonds research interests are in the economic uses of plants and fungi, and the uses of chemicals derived from plants and fungi. She is also involved in the identification of compounds derived from plants. Simmonds fundraised to create a collection of 7,000 specimens from Chinese medicine at Kew, and has been directing research aimed at using them to improve the safety of Traditional Chinese Medicine.

Simmonds has provided chemical botanical investigations in several criminal investigations. She was responsible for identifying the plant Gelsemium elegans as a possible cause of the poisoning of Alexander Perepilichny in 2015. Simmonds identified sesame in the food from Pret a manger eaten by Natasha Ednan-Laperouse before her allergic reaction and death in 2016.

Simmonds is a Fellow of the Royal Entomological Society, the World Innovation Foundation, the Royal Society of Biology, and the Linnean Society.

The standard author abbreviation M.Simmonds is used to indicate this person as the author when citing a botanical name.

== Selected publications ==
- Maike Petersen; Monique S J Simmonds (1 January 2003). "Rosmarinic acid". Phytochemistry. 62 (2): 121–125. doi:10.1016/s0031-9422(02)00513-7. ISSN 0031-9422. PMID 12482446. Wikidata Q35025960.
- Catherine W Lukhoba; Monique S J Simmonds; Alan J Paton (3 January 2006). "Plectranthus: a review of ethnobotanical uses". Journal of Ethnopharmacology. 103 (1): 1–24. doi:10.1016/j.jep.2005.09.011. ISSN 0378-8741. PMID 16289602. Wikidata Q28282057.
- Monique S J Simmonds (1 September 2003). "Flavonoid-insect interactions: recent advances in our knowledge". Phytochemistry. 64 (1): 21–30. doi:10.1016/s0031-9422(03)00293-0. ISSN 0031-9422. PMID 12946403. Wikidata Q35208488.
- Alex Asase; Alfred A Oteng-Yeboah; George T Odamtten; Monique S J Simmonds; Asase, A.; Oteng-Yeboah, A.A.; Odamtten, G.T.; Simmonds, M.S.J. (18 April 2005). "Ethnobotanical study of some Ghanaian anti-malarial plants". Journal of Ethnopharmacology. 99 (2): 273–279. doi:10.1016/j.jep.2005.02.020. ISSN 0378-8741. PMID 15894138. Wikidata Q40422649.
- Royal Botanic Gardens, Kew; Susana Gonçalves (September 2020), State of the World’s Plants and Fungi 2020 (PDF), Royal Botanic Gardens, Kew, doi:10.34885/172, Wikidata Q100146648, archived from the original (PDF) on 7 October 2020
- Simmonds MS (1 February 2001). "Importance of flavonoids in insect--plant interactions: feeding and oviposition". Phytochemistry. 56 (3): 245–252. doi:10.1016/s0031-9422(00)00453-2. ISSN 0031-9422. PMID 11243451. Wikidata Q52586631.
