= 14-Hydroxygelsenicine =

Indole alkaloid found in some plants

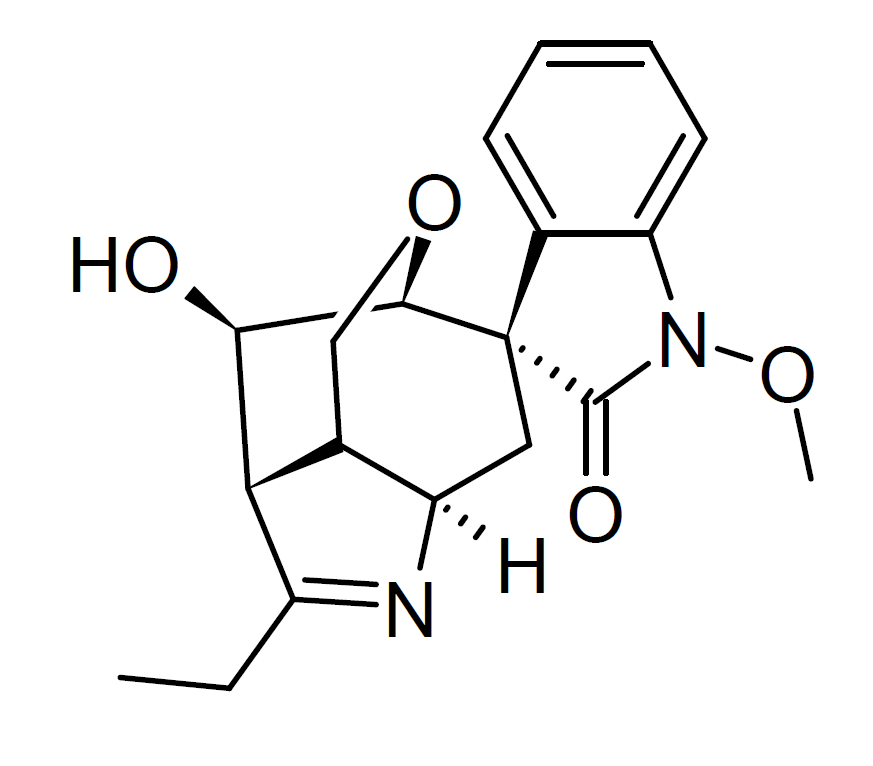

Clinical data
- Trade names: 14-Hydroxygelsenicine
- Other names: HGE

Legal status
- Legal status: In general: legal

Pharmacokinetic data
- Bioavailability: ~55%
- Metabolism: NA
- Elimination half-life: 7-12 h
- Excretion: Renal

Identifiers
- IUPAC name: Spiro[3H-indole-3,7'(6'H)-[3,6]methano[3H]oxepino[4,3-b]pyrrol]-2(1H)-one, 2'-ethyl-3'a,4',8',8'a-tetrahydro-9'-hydroxy-1-methoxy-, (3S,3'R,3'aS,6'S,8'aS,9'R)
- CAS Number: 114027-39-3
- PubChem CID: 14217347
- ChemSpider: 24706254
- ChEMBL: ChEMBL496074
- CompTox Dashboard (EPA): DTXSID501314738

Chemical and physical data
- Formula: C_{19}H_{22}N_{2}O_{4}
- Molar mass: 342.395 g·mol^{−1}
- 3D model (JSmol): Interactive image
- Density: 1.53+-0.1 g/cm^{3}
- Boiling point: 453.3–570.3 °C (847.9–1,058.5 °F)
- SMILES: CCC1=NC2CC3(C4C(C1C2CO4)O)C5=CC=CC=C5N(C3=O)OC
- InChI: InChI=1S/C19H22N2O4/c1-3-12-15-10-9-25-17(16(15)22)19(8-13(10)20-12)11-6-4-5-7-14(11)21(24-2)18(19)23/h4-7,10,13,15-17,22H,3,8-9H2,1-2H3/t10-,13+,15-,16-,17-,19+/m1/s1; Key:FLDAHLDTMBMPJD-HCWKNHCHSA-N

14-Hydroxygelsenicine (HGE) is a gelsedine-type indole alkaloid naturally found in some plants of the Gelsemium genus (Gelsemium elegans and Gelsemium sempervirens). G. elegans was used in traditional Chinese medicine as a remedy for a plethora of conditions such as skin ulcers and dermatitis, pain related to cancer, rheumatic arthritis, psoriasis as well as to treat bone fractures. It can also be found under the names “Duan Chang Cao”, “Gou Wen” and “heartbreak grass”. G. elegans is also known for its toxic effects; it is used by hilltribes of southeastern Asia as an effective means of committing suicide and has been linked to certain types of toxic honey, where HGE was the most abundant component. Gelsedine-type alkaloids from G. elegans usually express high toxicity, with gelsenicine being one of the most toxic. However, toxicity of HGE has not yet been thoroughly researched. More recent studies have shown that alkaloids derived from G. elegans have anti-tumor, anti-inflammatory, analgesic, and immunomodulation properties, with the toxic dose being close to the therapeutic dose.

== Structure and reactivity ==
The organic compound 14-Hydroxygelsenicine (HGE or Spiro[3H-indole-3,7'(6'H)-[3,6]methano[3H]oxepino[4,3-b]pyrrol]-2(1H)-one, 2'-ethyl-3'a,4',8',8'a-tetrahydro-9'-hydroxy-1-methoxy-, (3S,3'R,3'aS,6'S,8'aS,9'R)-) is an indole alkaloid which falls under the gelsedine type group belonging to gelsemium alkaloids. HGE has, like all gelsedine-type alkaloids, a oxabicyclo[3.2.2] nonane core and a spiro-N-methyl indolinone moiety connected to it, which is an indole structural intertwined with a derivative of hydroxamic acid. The difference between HGE and gelsenicine is the oxygenation at C14. The binding energy of HGE to key targets is low in comparison to other alkaloids with higher LD50 values. The methoxy and carbonyl groups of the indole nucleus of HGE increase the possibility of hydrogen bonding with the target proteins; this increases the affinity between the ligand and the receptor. There is a difference in toxicity levels between the isotopes of HGE and humantendine (HGE is 0.295 mg·kg−1 p.o. and humantendine 0.21 mg·kg−1 i.p.). This points to a different reactivity between the isotopes.

== Synthesis ==
It has been suggested that biologically, HGE is created via oxygenation at C14 of gelsedilam, a lactam derivative of gelsenicine. In the laboratory, (−)-14-Hydroxygelsenicine can be synthesized from a related alkaloid (−)-14-hydroxygelsedilam. The process includes acetylation of the C14 hydroxy group (yielding (−)-14-acetoxygelsedilam), followed by introducing a two-carbon unit onto C20. This introduction was done by converting lactam into a N-Boc derivative and treating it with ethylmagnesium bromide followed by trifluoroacetic acid. Lactam is converted into N-Boc via protonation of the nitrogen atom, creating an unstable intermediate, followed by a reaction with an N-Boc-reagent.

Another option for synthesis of HGE is via the partial reduction of the C14-C15 epoxide of the dihydroxygelsenicine compound. The epoxide functionality is introduced through treatment with TBHP and Triton B. Formal cis hydration of the C14-C15 double bond yields (−)-14-hydroxygelsenicine.

== Reactions ==
HHGE can react biogenetically with 7-deoxygelsemide, creating gelseiridone. The hydroxamic acid moiety of HGE can rearrange in the presence of a strong base and at low temperatures, creating isocyanates. The resulting isocyanates could then react with skin proteins.

In the liver of humans and rats, HGE can be metabolized via hydroxylation, reduction, N-dimethyl ether and glucuronic acid binding reaction. HGE reacts with CNS neuron currents of rats of the γ-aminobutyric acid (GABA) receptor, because HGE most likely delays the closing of the CL- ion channel of the GABA receptor. This reaction doesn’t occur in bees, because they have alternative or compensatory ionotropic receptors. This reaction doesn’t occurs in bees, because they have alternative or compensatory ionotropic receptors.

== Available forms ==
Humantendine, humantenidine and HGE are three known isomers of the compound.

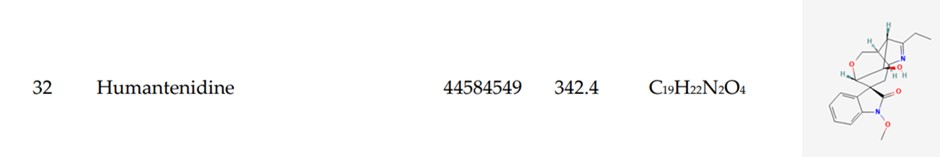

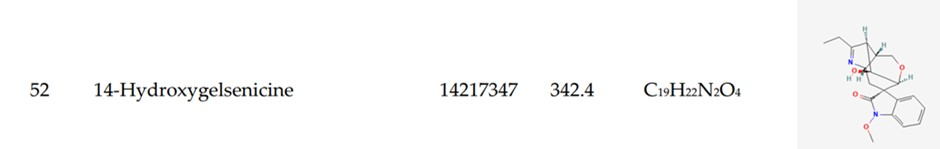

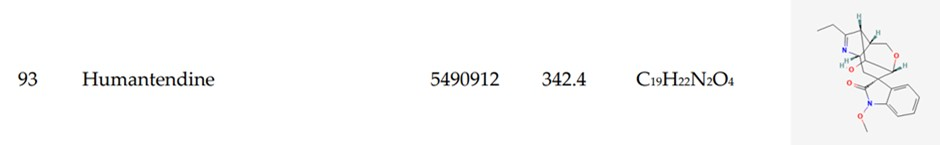

== Mechanism of action ==
HGE was shown to exhibit selective osteoclast inhibitory activity by inducing osteoclast apoptosis and inhibiting their proliferation. This is likely through increasing the expression of apoptotic factors caspase 9 and reducing the expression of inflammatory factors IL-6 and mitogenic factors c-Jun.

The effects of G. elegans were shown to be detoxified by another plant, Mussaenda pubescens. Though the exact mechanisms of this are still unknown, Mussaenda pubsecens treatment resulted in a decreased absorption and increased efflux of indole alkaloids in Caco-2 cells. This was especially the case in indole alkaloids with N-O structures. It is believed that active transport is the dominant transport process for indole alkaloids in Caco-2 cells and there are indications that P-gp and MRP2 transporters participate in the efflux transport of these substances. HGE was found to have a rapid absorption rate in multiple studies as well as being able to pass the blood-brain barrier easily, though the exact mechanisms are still unknown.

Differential toxicity of HGE between genders was reported, with higher AUC and Cmax values and a lower LD50 in female rats. It is hypothesized that this may be due to differences in the abundance of cytochrome P450 monooxygenase CYP3A4, which plays an important role in the metabolism of HGE.

14-(R)-Hydroxygelsenicine (HGE) exhibits specific neurotoxicity by enhancing the binding of γ-aminobutyric acid (GABA) to its receptors. HGE increases the affinity of GABA binding to its receptor, thus decreasing the neuronal excitability. Flumazenil, a selective antagonist of GABA receptors, can increase the survival rate after exposure to HGE, though the exact mechanism remains unclear.

Many mechanisms of HGE are not yet elucidated due to insufficient research or lack of observed effects. For instance, though gelsedine-type alkaloids can have cytotoxic activity against A431 epidermoid carcinoma cells, HGE was found as inactive regarding cytotoxic effects.

== Metabolism ==
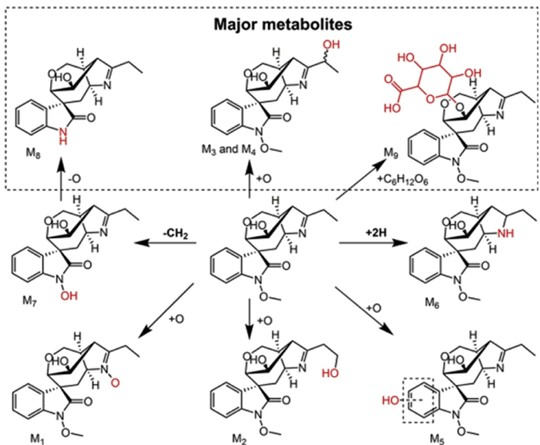
Metabolism of 14-Hydroxy

A study looking into the metabolism of HGE was performed on liver microsomes. The major metabolic pathways for HGE are hydroxylation, reduction, N-de-methyl ether and glucuronic acid binding reaction (Fig 1). The 14,19- di-hydroxy-hooked ketones are the dominant metabolites, they are catalyzed mainly by cytochrome P450 monooxygenase CYP3A4. The detected derivatives of 14,19-di-hydroxy-hooked ketones, N-demethylated and glucuronidation of HGE are the primary metabolites in plasma and urine based on in vivo analysis. Hence, they provide three biomarkers to facilitate the diagnosis of HGE associated intoxication.

== Indications ==
There are indications that HGE targets the spinal cord, as spinal-cord excitatory drugs picrotoxin and flumazenil were reported to increase the survival of HGE-treated mice. Furthermore, HGE could potentially disturb the physiological metabolism of neurons due to its high toxicity and specific distribution in the central nervous system. Studies on rats and pigs suggest that toxicological differences between species might be due to differing degrees of absorption and exposure of gelsedine-type alkaloids, especially HGE.

== Efficacy ==
Studies have found that HGE plays a role in antitumor activity by inducing apoptosis in cancer cells. It is also shown to have inhibiting powers on the growth and proliferation of cancer cells by interfering with the activity of a protein called STAT3. Research into the compound has also shown that it can inhibit osteoclast activity via reduction of the inflammatory factors IL-6 and mitogenic factors c-Jun whilst simultaneously increasing the expression of apoptosis factor caspase-9. Osteoclasts that show abnormal activity are inducers of osteoporosis, one of the most serious diseases facing a rapidly aging population, and they can hinder bone fracture repair. HGE has shown itself to have potential efficacy in that region due to its ability to inhibit osteoclasts. This, together with its use in the battle against cancer, makes HGE a potent medicine. The biggest problem with its usage as a medicine is that the administrative dose is very close to the dosing level where adverse effects arise. This makes proper dosing of vital importance when using HGE as a medicine.

== Adverse effects ==
An oral administration of purified HGE in mice resulted in symptoms such as irregular rhythm of breath and death. These effects were observed in a dose dependent manner due to the neurotoxicity of HGE. Similar symptoms are found in humans after accidental consumption of G. elegans as well as the toxic honey produced from it. The poisoning symptoms occur in a latent period of a few minutes to several hours, depending on the actual amount of HGE consumed. HGE is rapidly absorbed from the gastrointestinal tract as indicated by the bioavailability. Moreover, HGE can easily pass through the blood-brain barrier to reach high concentrations in the brain and the spinal cord, it also reaches high concentrations in the plasma after oral administration.

== Toxicity ==
14-Hydroxygelsenicine is toxic in certain quantities due to its ability to cause apoptosis and inhibit osteoclasts. It also has the potency to cause sensitisation of the skin of mammals. This is due to its hydroxamic acid group being able to rearrange to produce an isocyanate carbamylating agent, capable of reacting with skin proteins by carbamylating nucleophilic residues. It also shows specific neurotoxicity by enhancing the binding of γ-aminobutyric acid (GABA) to its receptors, this leads to decreased excitability of the affected neurons which eventually results in dyspnoea.

Not much is known about HGE as a compound specifically due to limited testing. It is only found in nature in G. elegans and G. sempervirens, plants native to the southeast of Asia and North America respectively. The toxicokinetic profiles of the various alkaloids present in G. elegans have shown that the plant is highly toxic to both humans and mice with an LD50 of 0.128 mg in mice. After ingestion of the compound respiration became labored. Thereafter the mice started convulsing and after 5–10 minutes death occurred. A difference in gender was also observed as female mice had an LD50 of 0.125 mg/kg and male mice had an LD50 of more than twice as high at 0.295 mg/kg, this is further solidified by the area under curve concentration and the max concentration values being around 2 times higher in female mice.

== Effects on animals ==
The compound is highly toxic to most animals, including humans. Interestingly, it seems to have positive applications such as insecticides and growth promoting factors on pigs and goats. Research into these differences, specifically pigs and rats, has shown that this is due to the rats being more susceptible to the toxic compound. After oral ingestion of G. elegans it was found that pigs had a concentration of the compound that was up to 3 times higher than the concentration found in rats. This means that, whilst the absorption rate of HGE is similar, the elimination rate of the HGE differs a lot inter-specially. This could explain why the toxicokinetic profiles of the same compound vary among different animals.

== See also ==
- Gelsemine
