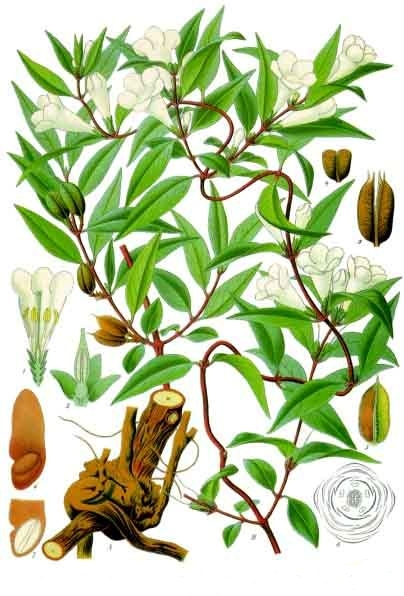
- Gelsemium sempervirens

Scientific classification
- Kingdom: Plantae
- Clade: Embryophytes
- Clade: Tracheophytes
- Clade: Spermatophytes
- Clade: Angiosperms
- Clade: Eudicots
- Clade: Asterids
- Order: Gentianales
- Family: Gelsemiaceae
- Genus: Gelsemium; Juss.

Synonyms
- Jeffersonia Brick. 1800 not Barton 1793; Medicia Gardn. & Champ.; Leptopteris Blume 1850 not C.Presl 1845

= Gelsemium =

Genus of plants

Gelsemium is an Asian and North American genus of flowering plants belonging to family Gelsemiaceae. The genus contains three species of shrubs to straggling or twining climbers. Two species are native to North America, and one to China and Southeast Asia.

Carl Linnaeus first classified G. sempervirens as Bignonia sempervirens in 1753; Antoine Laurent de Jussieu created a new genus for this species in 1789. Gelsemium is a Latinized form of the Italian word for jasmine, gelsomino. G. elegans has the common name "heartbreak grass".

== Properties ==
All three species of this genus are poisonous.

=== Active components ===
The active components of gelsemium are the alkaloids, which are present in a concentration of about 0.5%. These consist primarily of gelsemine (a highly toxic compound related to strychnine), with lesser amounts of related compounds (gelsemicine, gelsedine, etc). Other compounds found in the plant include scopoletin (also called gelsemic acid), a small amount of volatile oil, fatty acid and tannins.

Gelsemium has been shown to contain methoxyindoles.

=== Medicinal uses ===
As late as 1906, a drug called Gelsemium, made from the rhizome and rootlets of Gelsemium sempervirens, was used in the treatment of facial and other neuralgias. It also proved valuable in some cases of malarial fever, and was occasionally used as a cardiac depressant and in spasmodic affections, but was inferior for this purpose to other remedies.

== Species ==
| Species | Common names | Areal | Characteristics | Image |
|---|---|---|---|---|
| Gelsemium elegans | Heartbreak grass | Native to India, Indonesia, Laos, Malaysia, northern Myanmar, Taiwan, northern Thailand, Vietnam, and the Chinese provinces of Fujian, Guangdong, Guangxi, Guizhou, Hainan, Hunan, Jiangxi, Yunnan, and Zhejiang | Twining climber, found in scrubby forests and thickets from 200–2000 meters elevation | |
| Gelsemium rankinii | Rankin's jessamine, swamp jessamine, Rankin's trumpetflower | Native to southeastern United States | | |
| Gelsemium sempervirens | Yellow jessamine, Carolina jessamine, evening trumpetflower | Native to southeastern and south-central United States from Virginia to Texas and south through Mexico to Central America | It is commonly grown as a garden flower worldwide | |

== Alleged poisoning victims ==
- On 23 December 2011, Long Liyuan, a Chinese billionaire, died after eating cat stew that was allegedly poisoned with Gelsemium elegans.
- On 10 November 2012, Alexander Perepilichny died outside his UK home, after warning of Kremlin death threats he received related to the Magnitsky affair. A lawyer for the deceased's life insurance company told a pre-inquest hearing that toxicology reports had identified traces of Gelsemium in his body. However, this was later denied by an expert at the Royal Botanical Gardens, Kew, the Police and coroner concluded that he died of natural causes.

== Symptoms of poisoning ==
The poison affects the vision and respiration. Symptoms can appear almost immediately.

=== Arthur Conan Doyle's experiment ===
Sir Arthur Conan Doyle, the British physician and author of the Sherlock Holmes stories, once administered himself a small amount of gelsemium and kept increasing the amount every day until he could no longer stand the ill effects. In a letter written by him to the British Medical Journal published on 20 September 1879, he described that at lower doses he experienced "languor, giddiness, and a partial paralysis of the Ciliary muscle" (in the eye). At higher doses he had persistent diarrhea, severe frontal headache, and great depression, and therefore stopped his self-experimentation at 200 minims.

=== A rare case of Gelsemium addiction ===
In his classic early 20th century work on psychotropic drugs Phantastica, German pharmacologist Louis Lewin recounts the seemingly unique case of a person who became addicted (in a manner far more often associated with opiates) to a Gelsemium preparation:

during a severe attack of rheumatism a man took a large quantity of an alcoholic tincture of Gelsemium sempervirens a plant which is liable to act on the brain and the medulla oblongata. Noticing an appreciable result he continued to take it, and finally became a slave to the drug. He gradually augmented the quantity, and reached 30 gr. of the tincture in one dose. Slowly he became pale, agitated, and discontented. He wasted away. Hallucination set in, and his state grew worse until disorders of the intelligence appeared. As he continued to increase the doses he fell into idiocy and died in a state of mental confusion.
