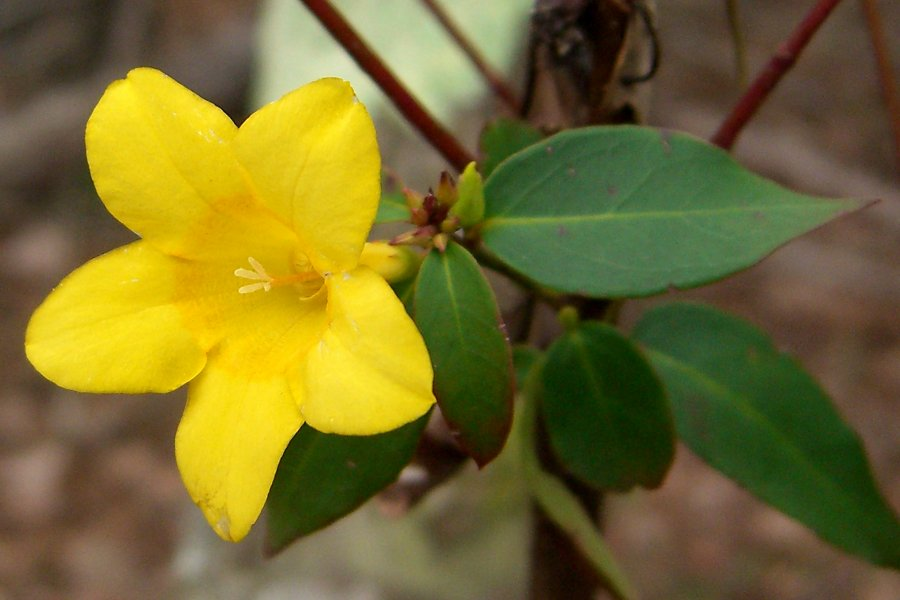

Conservation status
- Secure (NatureServe)

Scientific classification
- Kingdom: Plantae
- Clade: Tracheophytes
- Clade: Angiosperms
- Clade: Eudicots
- Clade: Asterids
- Order: Gentianales
- Family: Gelsemiaceae
- Genus: Gelsemium
- Species: G. rankinii

Binomial name
- Gelsemium rankinii Small 1928

= Gelsemium rankinii =

Species of plant

Gelsemium rankinii, the Rankin's trumpetflower or swamp jessamine, is a twining vine in the family Gelsemiaceae, native to the southeastern United States from Louisiana to the Carolinas.

Gelsemium rankinii is a vine that will climb over other vegetation to a height of 6 meters (20 feet) or more. It has glossy green leaves and groups of showy yellow flowers.
