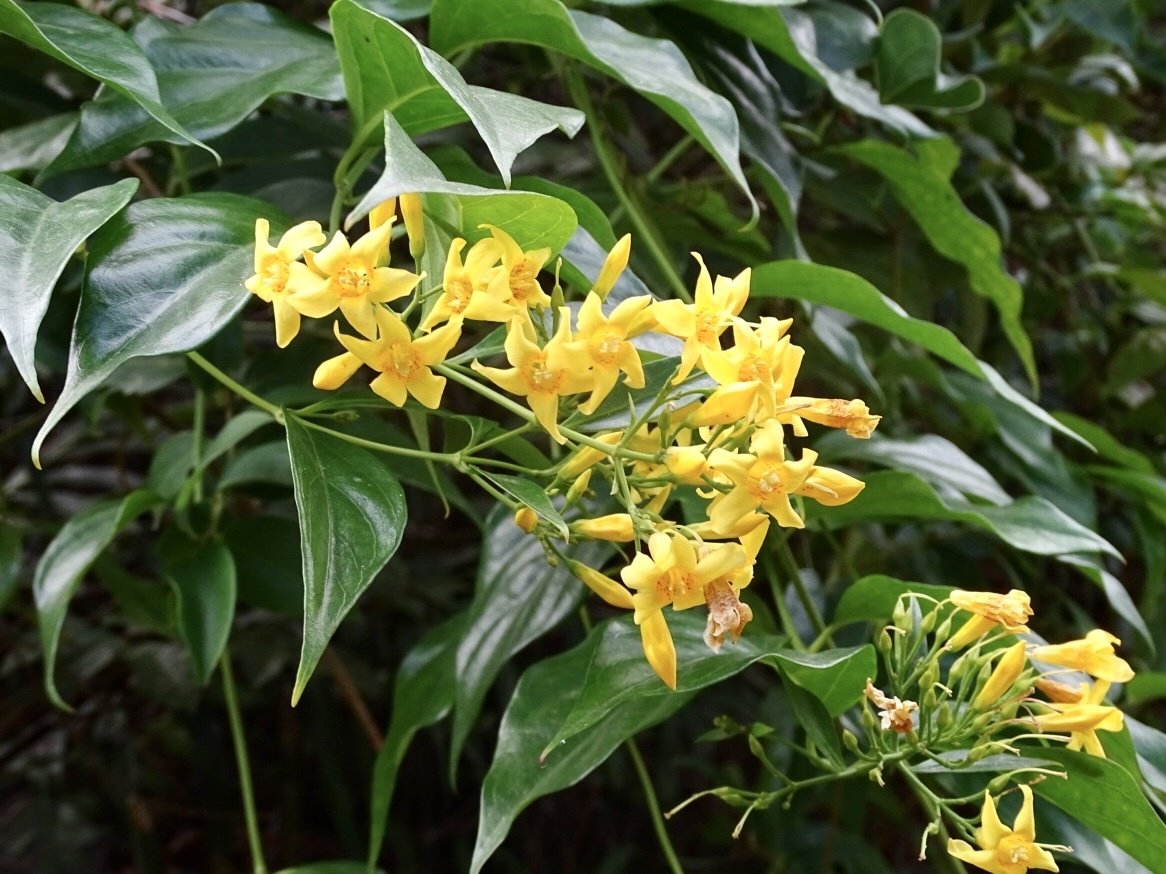

Scientific classification
- Kingdom: Plantae
- Clade: Tracheophytes
- Clade: Angiosperms
- Clade: Eudicots
- Clade: Asterids
- Order: Gentianales
- Family: Gelsemiaceae
- Genus: Gelsemium
- Species: G. elegans

Binomial name
- Gelsemium elegans (Gardner & Chapm.) Benth.

= Gelsemium elegans =

Species of plant

Gelsemium elegans, commonly known as heartbreak grass, is a poisonous plant of the family Gelsemiaceae found in China and other Asian countries. It contains toxic alkaloids such as gelsemine, gelsenicine, gelsevirine, koumine and 14-Hydroxygelsenicine.

Crumbled leaves of this plant, surreptitiously added to food, were used in the 23rd of December 2011 poisoning of Long Liyuan, a magnate of the Chinese timber industry, and perhaps in the 10th of November 2012 poisoning of Alexander Perepilichny, a Russian financier cooperating with a fraud investigation in London, though the role of the plant in his death has been disputed. This plant is also reputed to be the cause of death for Shennong, the first Yan emperor, who is said to have consumed many plants as part of his study of medicinal herbs.
