= Blas Pablo Reko =

- Born: Blasius Paul Reko; 1877; Vienna, Austria
- Died: February 1953
- Known for: Work with plants and psychedelic drugs

Blas Pablo Reko (1877 – February 1953) was an Austrian-born physician and amateur ethnobotanist and anthropologist. He was Slavic and was born Blasius Paul Reko in Austria, but then spent much of his life in Mexico where he adopted the name Blas Pablo Reko.

Reko worked for a mining company for many years in Oaxaca, Mexico, before he started working in the area of plants in 1917. He published a number of scholarly works on plants. Reko, working with Richard Evans Schultes and others, played a key role in the early description and elucidation of the hallucinogenic Mexican plants and fungi teonanácatl (now Psilocybe mexicana), ololiúqui (now Ipomoea corymbosa), and hoja de adivinación (now Salvia divinorum).

He was controversial in having been an ardent supporter of the Nazi Party. Reko had a cousin named Viktor Aloisius Reko, who also worked in the area of psychoactive drugs, with much of the information he published originally having been derived from Blas Pablo Reko.

== Selected publications ==
- Reko, Blas Pablo (December 1919). "De los Nombres Botánicos Aztecas" [On Aztec Botanical Names]. El México Antiguo. 1 (5): 113–157. Archived from the original on 28 July 2010.
- Reko, Blas Pablo (1934). "Das Mexikanische Rauschgift Ololiuqui" [The Mexican Narcotic Ololiuqui]. El México Antiguo. 3 (3/4): 1–7. Archived from the original on 22 May 2008.
- Reko, B. P. (April 1940). "Teonanacatl, the Narcotic Mushroom" (PDF). American Anthropologist. 42 (2): 368–369. doi:10.1525/aa.1940.42.2.02a00310.
- Reko, Blas Pablo (1945). Mitobotánica Zapoteca [Zapotec Mythobotany]. Tacubaya, México: Privately printed.
- Reko, B.P. (15 May 1947). "Nombres botánicos del manuscrito badiano" [Botanical names from the Badian manuscript]. Botanical Sciences (5): 23–43. doi:10.17129/botsci.940. ISSN 2007-4476.

== See also ==
- Viktor Aloisius Reko
