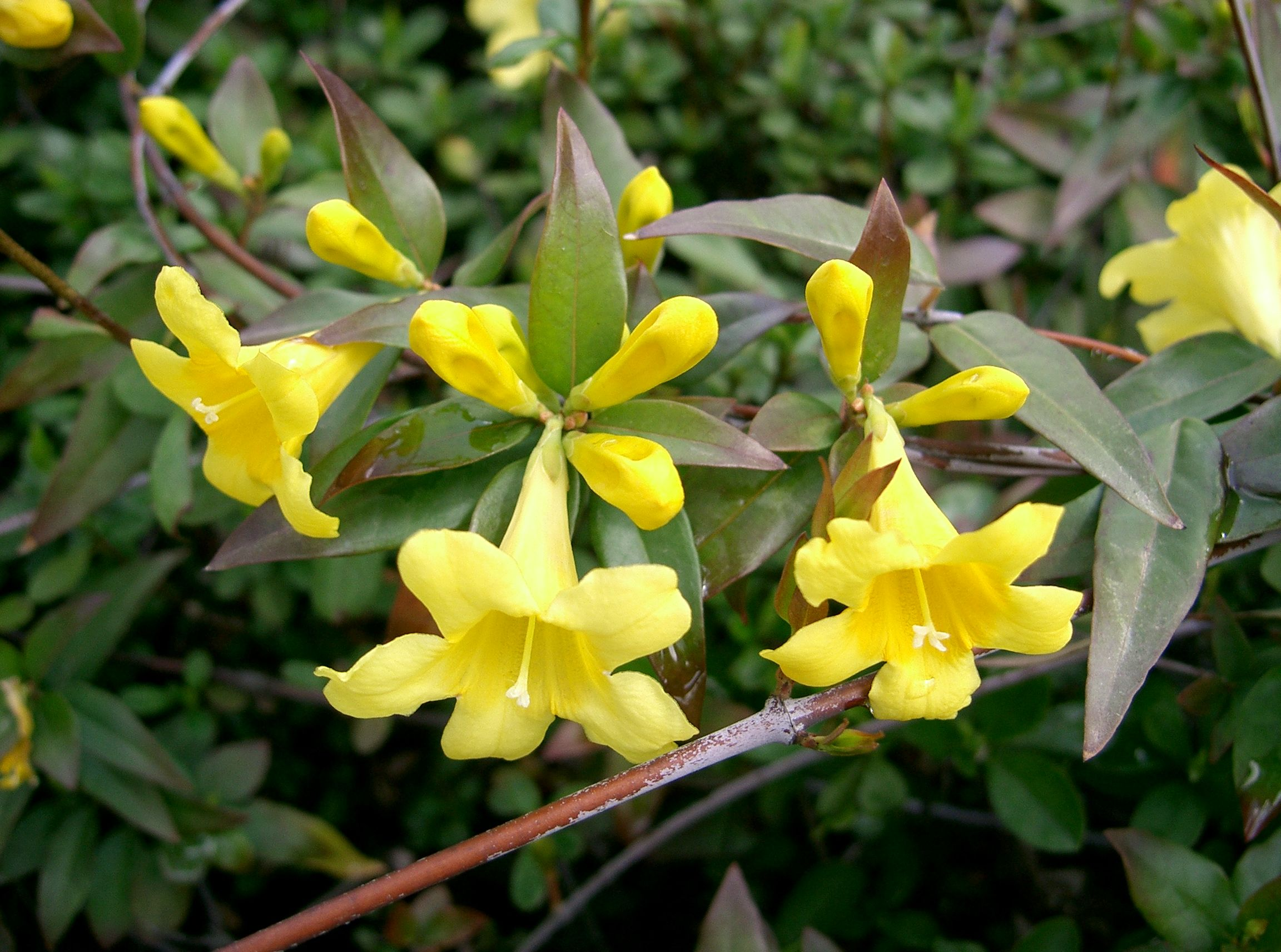

Conservation status
- Secure (NatureServe)

Scientific classification
- Kingdom: Plantae
- Clade: Tracheophytes
- Clade: Angiosperms
- Clade: Eudicots
- Clade: Asterids
- Order: Gentianales
- Family: Gelsemiaceae
- Genus: Gelsemium
- Species: G. sempervirens

Binomial name
- Gelsemium sempervirens (L.) J.St.-Hil. 1805 not Pers. 1805 nor Ait. 1811

Synonyms
- Bignonia sempervirens L. 1753; Gelsemium lucidum Poir.; Gelsemium nitidum Michx.; Jeffersonia sempervirens (L.) Brickell; Lisianthus sempervirens (L.) Mill. ex Steud.; Lisianthius volubilis Salisb.

= Gelsemium sempervirens =

Species of plant

Gelsemium sempervirens is a twining vine in the family Gelsemiaceae, native to subtropical and tropical America: Honduras, Guatemala, Belize, Mexico (Chiapas, Oaxaca, Veracruz, Puebla, Hidalgo), and southeastern and south-central United States (from Texas to Virginia). It has a number of common names including yellow jessamine or confederate jessamine or jasmine, Carolina jasmine or jessamine, evening trumpetflower, gelsemium and woodbine.

Yellow jessamine is the state flower of South Carolina.

Despite its common name, the species is not a "true jasmine" and not of the genus Jasminum.

== Growth ==
Gelsemium sempervirens can grow to 3–6 m (10–20 ft) high when given suitable climbing support in trees, with thin stems. The plant is perennial. The leaves are evergreen, lanceolate, 5–10 cm (2–4 in) long and 1–1.5 cm (3/8–5/8 in) broad, and lustrous, dark green. The flowers are borne in clusters, the individual flowers yellow, sometimes with an orange center, trumpet-shaped, 3 cm (1 1/4 in) long and 2.5–3 cm (1–1 1/4 in) broad. Its flowers are strongly scented and produce nectar that attracts a range of pollinators.

== History ==
Some 19th century sources identified Gelsemium sempervirens as a folk remedy for various medical conditions. William Bartram encountered this species (then referred to as Bignonia sempervirens) on his travels along the coasts of the Carolinas and Georgia in 1773.

== Toxicity ==
All parts of this plant contain the toxic strychnine-related alkaloids gelsemine and gelseminine and should not be consumed. The sap may cause skin irritation in sensitive individuals. Children, mistaking this flower for honeysuckle, have been poisoned by sucking the nectar from the flower. The nectar is also toxic to honeybees, which may cause brood death when gathered by the bees. The nectar may, however, be beneficial to bumblebees. It has been shown that bumblebees fed on gelsemine have a reduced load of Crithidia bombi in their fecal matter after 7 days, although this difference was not significant after 10 days. Reduced parasite load increases foraging efficiency, and pollinators may selectively collect otherwise toxic secondary metabolites as a means of self-medication.

The plant can be lethal to livestock.

== Cultivation ==
Despite the hazards, this is a popular garden plant in warmer areas, frequently being trained to grow over arbors or to cover walls. In the UK, it has won the Royal Horticultural Society's Award of Garden Merit. It can be grown outdoors in mild and coastal areas of the UK (to a lower limit of −5 °C (23 °F)), but elsewhere must be grown under glass. It requires a sheltered position in full sun or light shade.

== Ecology ==
Gelsemium sempervirens is insect pollinated and is recorded to have been visited in northern Florida by Bombus impatiens, Ceratina, Habropoda laboriosa, Lasioglossum reticulatum, Osmia sandhouseae, and Xylocopa virginica.

== Gallery ==
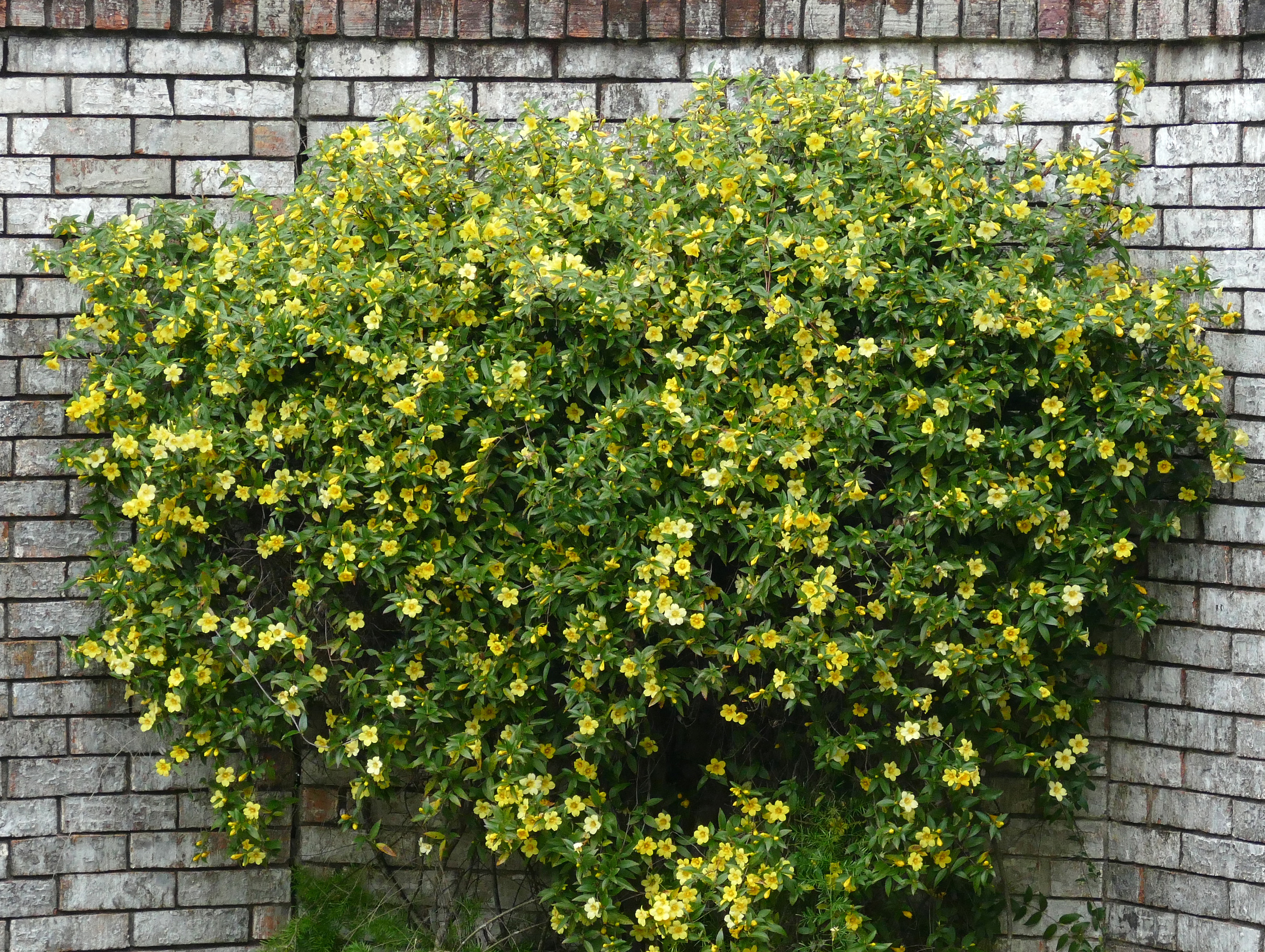
Shrub

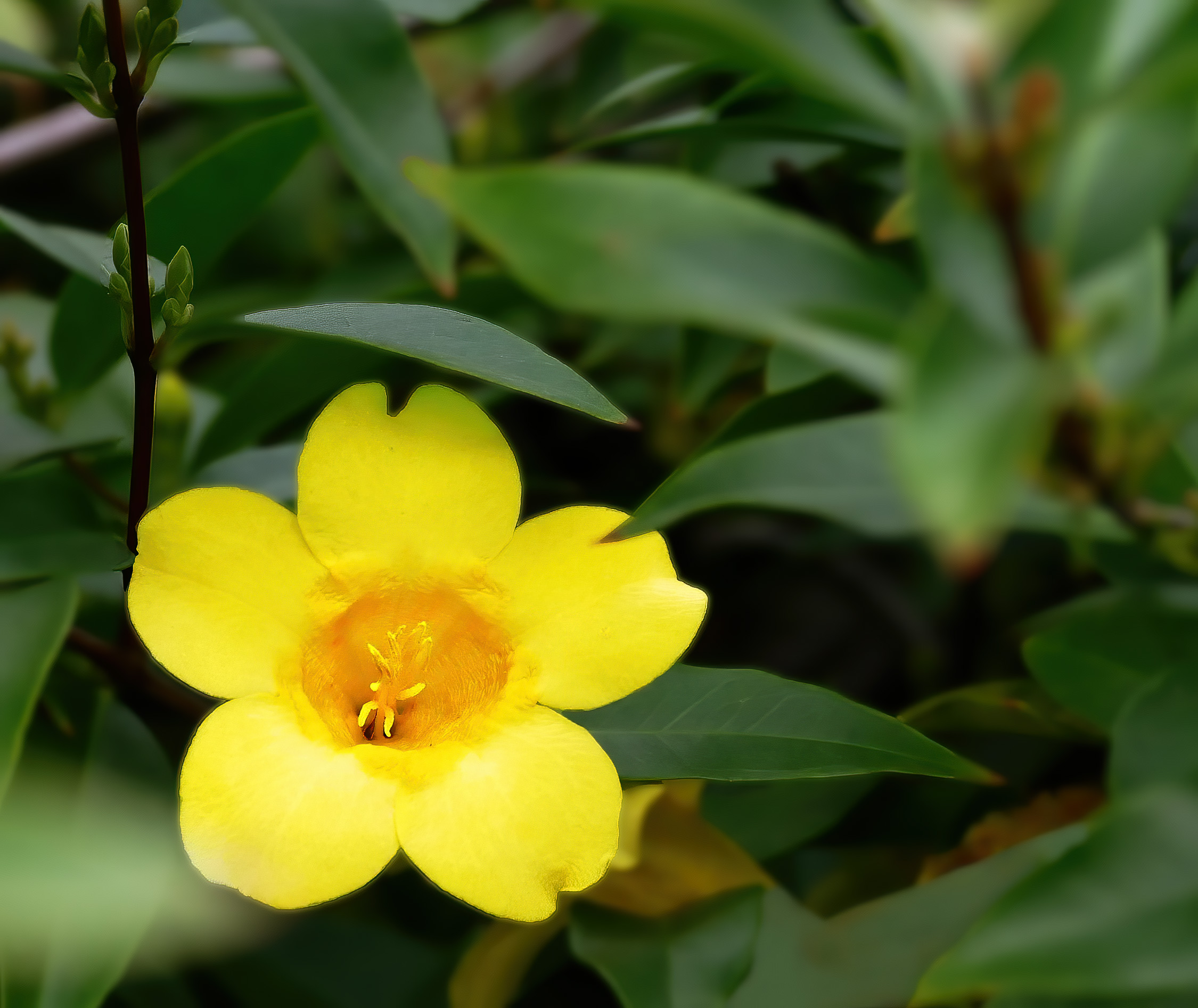
Flower

== See also ==
- List of poisonous plants
- Gelsemium elegans
- Gelsemium rankinii
