= Alexander Perepilichny =

Russian businessman and whistleblower

Alexander Yurevich Perepilichny (Russian: Алекса́ндр Ю́рьевич Перепели́чный, IPA: [ɐlʲɪkˈsandr ˈjʉrʲjɪvʲɪtɕ pʲɪrʲɪpʲɪˈlʲitɕnɨj]; 15 July 1968 – 10 November 2012) was a Russian businessman and whistleblower who died while jogging near London in 2012, after leaving Russia in 2009.

Two autopsies proved inconclusive, as did advanced toxicology tests. He was alleged to have been killed as part of the conspiracy to cover up the theft of $230 million from the Treasury of Russia.

== Career ==
In December 2007, Perepilichny's Quartell Trading signed a contract to buy $3,172,000 worth of "furniture", from Balec Ventures, a company owned by Issa al-Zeydi, who is a Russian of Syrian descent sanctioned by the U.S. Treasury Department in 2014, due to his connection to the Scientific Studies and Research Center in Syria.

== Whistle-blowing ==
Perepilichny, a financier, left Moscow in 2009 to live in the United Kingdom. In 2010, Perepilichny handed over documents to Swiss prosecutors detailing the involvement of senior Russian officials in the fraud of $230 million from the Russian Treasury through Hermitage Capital Management. The case has developed worldwide media coverage through the death of lawyer Sergei Magnitsky.

== Death ==
On 10 November 2012, Perepilichny travelled back to the UK from a three-day trip to Paris. After arriving home, he went out to jog in St George's Hill, and was found dead on the road by a neighbour. A video of his corpse was widely circulated online in the aftermath of his death.

Perepilichny had no reported health issues when he collapsed. Two years after his death, one of Perepilichny's life insurance companies, Legal & General, ordered tests that detected a toxin from a Chinese flowering plant Gelsemium in his stomach; the plant is nicknamed "heartbreak grass" because its leaves trigger cardiac arrest if ingested. Mr Perepilichny's other insurers have not raised any objections or requested access to the inquest.

Fiona Barton, the lawyer for Surrey Police, has continued to maintain that "No identifiable toxin was found and that remains the case", she said.

== Allegations of assassination ==
Weeks after his death, the British press reported that in 2011 Perepilichny's name had reputedly been placed on a list of targets wanted dead in connection with the Treasury theft.

Geoffrey Robertson QC, representing the company which had led the fraud investigation, stated in court that Perepilichny may have been talking to the British security services shortly before his death. He described 45 sensitive documents that had been kept secret under public interest immunity as a "cover-up".

In 2017, it was reported, but unconfirmed, that U.S. intelligence officials passed MI6 intelligence indicating that Perepilichny was likely "assassinated on direct orders from Putin or people close to him". A U.S. intelligence report to Congress asserted with "high confidence" that Perepilichny was assassinated on the orders of Russian officials. A National Intelligence Council memorandum mentions Perepilichny was possibly assassinated on orders from the Kremlin.

Canadian newspaper The Globe and Mail reported in 2018 that French police were investigating Perepilichny's death as a likely assassination.
