= Phantastica =

1924 book by Louis Lewin

Phantastica: Die Betäubenden und Erregenden Genussmittel für Ärzte und Nichtärzte
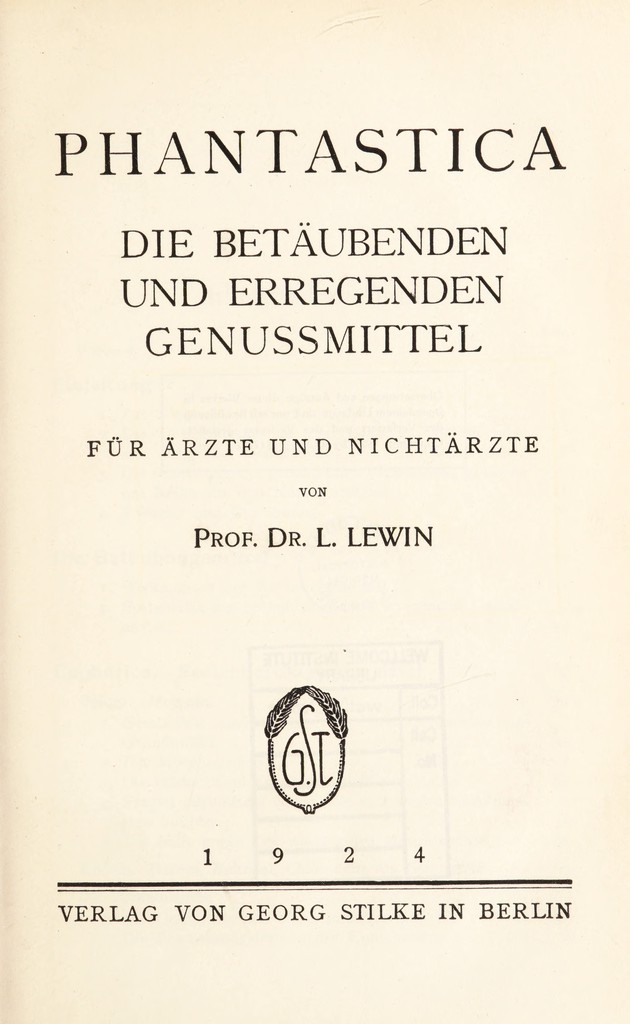
- Author: Louis Lewin (1850–1929)
- Translator: P. H. A. Wirth
- Language: German
- Subject: Psychoactive drugs
- Genre: Non-fiction
- Publisher: George Stilke
- Publication date: 1924
- Publication place: Berlin, Germany
- English publication date: 1931
- OCLC: 12951162
- Website: www.google.com/books/edition/Phantastica/YmF9NjnE8NQC

Phantastica: Die Betäubenden und Erregenden Genussmittel für Ärzte und Nichtärzte, also known as Phantastica: Narcotic and Stimulant Substances for Physicians and Laypeople, is a classic 1924 book about psychoactive drugs by the German pharmacologist Louis Lewin (1850–1929).

In the book, Lewin extensively reviews psychoactive drugs and classifies them into five main categories, including "euphorica" (euphoriants), "phantastica" (hallucinogens), "inebriantia" (depressants), "hypnotica" (hypnotics), and "excitantia" (stimulants).

It covers the "euphorica" opium and morphine, codeine and other opioids, and coca and cocaine; the "phantastica" peyote and mescaline, cannabis, fly agaric (Amanita muscaria), nightshade deliriants, Banisteriopsis caapi and ayahuasca, Gelsemium sempervirens (yellow jessamine), and loco herbs (locoweed; Fabaceae species); the "inebriantia" alcohol, chloroform, ether, petroleum benzine, and nitrous oxide; the "hypnotica" chloral, barbital (Veronal), paraldehyde, sulfonmethane (Sulphonal), potassium bromide, kava kava, and kanna; and the "excitantia" camphor, betel, khat, caffeine and coffee, tea, kola nut, maté, Ilex cassine, pasta guarana, cocoa, tobacco, parica, arsenic, and mercury.

The book has been translated into multiple other languages and reprinted many times. It was translated into English by P. H. A. Wirth in 1931. Phantastica is regarded as Lewin's magnum opus. Aldous Huxley read the English translation soon after it was released and the book had a considerable impact on him, leading to his 1931 A Treatise on Drugs essay and his eventual experimentation with psychedelic drugs like mescaline and LSD as well as associated books like The Doors of Perception (1954).

== See also ==
- List of psychedelic literature
