= Louis Lewin =

German pharmacologist

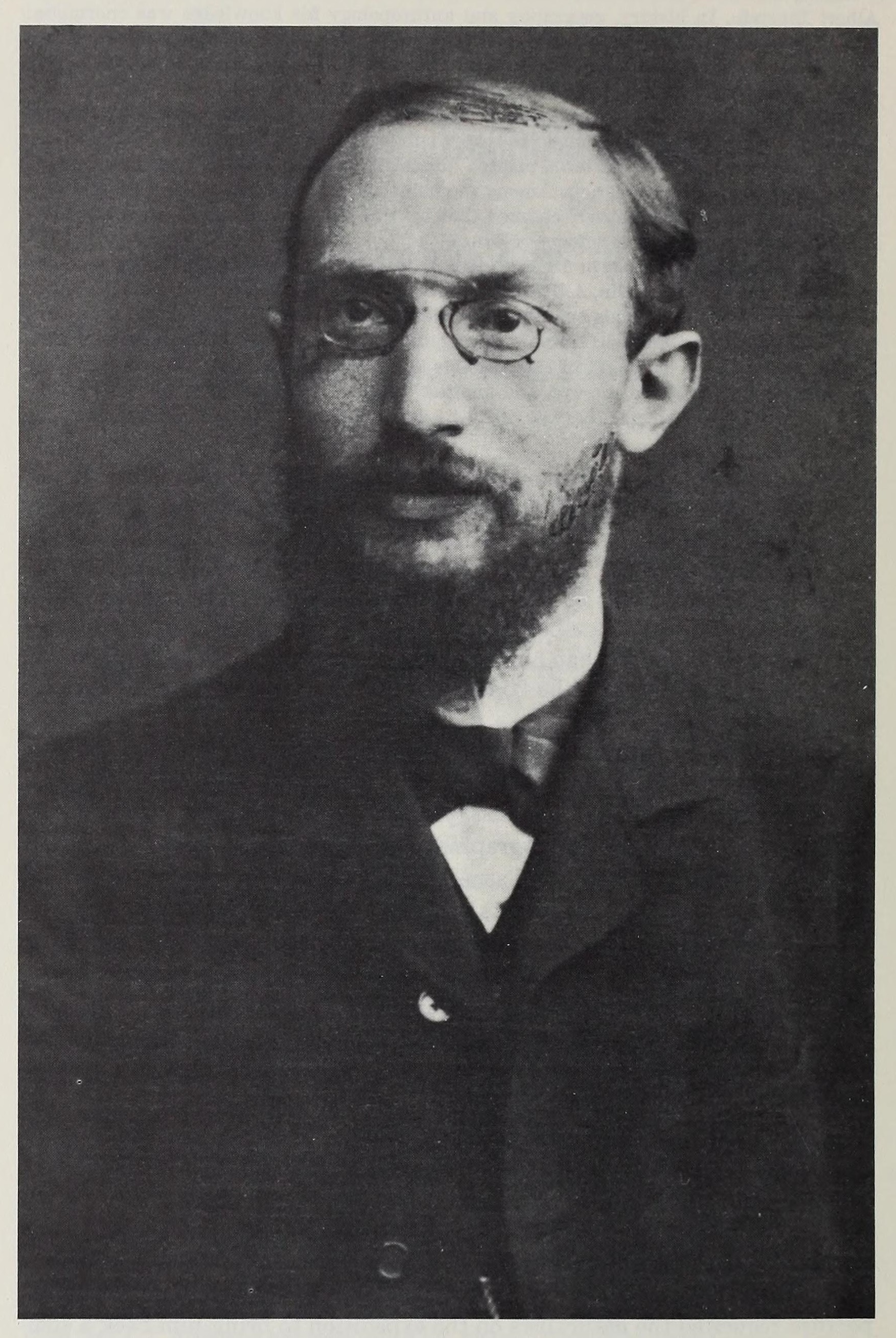
- Born: 9 November 1850; Tuchel, West Prussia
- Died: 1 December 1929 (aged 79); Berlin, Germany
- Occupation: Pharmacologist
- Known for: Work with psychoactive drugs

Louis Lewin (9 November 1850 - 1 December 1929) was a German pharmacologist. In 1887 he received his first sample of the Peyote cactus from Dallas, Texas-based physician John Raleigh Briggs (1851-1907), and later published the first methodical analysis of it, causing a variant to be named Anhalonium lewinii in his honor.

Lewin was born in Tuchel, West Prussia. He received his education at the gymnasium and the University of Berlin (M.D. 1876). The two years following his graduation he spent at Munich, in the laboratories of von Voit and Pettenkofer. Returning to Berlin in 1878, he became an assistant at the pharmacological institute of the university, and in 1881 he was admitted to the medical faculty as Privatdozent. In 1897 he was finally appointed professor.

Louis Lewin's book "Die Nebenwirkungen der Arzneimittel" (1881) deals with the borderline between the pharmacological and the toxicological action of drugs with the untoward or side-effects of all kinds of medicaments. It was the first book of its kind. Another of his important books was Phantastica (1924), which began an era of ethnobotany that continues to the present day.

Lewin mentioned in his book "Gifte und Vergiftungen" (1929) the causal connection between dental amalgam fillings and illness. One of his famous patients were the well-known chemistry professor Alfred Stock (1876-1946), who suffered from mercury poisoning due to occupational exposure. Lewin informed him also about mercury exposure from dental amalgams. In 1926 in an article in Zeitschrift für Angewandte Chemie (Journal of Applied Chemistry), Stock claimed that released mercury from amalgam fillings caused poisoning and demanded the consumption stopped. This triggered a sharp and intense debate in Germany.

Lewin died in Berlin, where a street and the nearby underground train station were named in honour of Louis Lewin.

== Drug classification ==
One of Lewin's most enduring tasks was to create a system of classification of psychoactive drugs and plants based on their pharmacologic action. His original categories were:

- Inebriantia (Inebriants such as alcohol or ether)
- Excitantia (Stimulants such as Khat or Amphetamine)
- Euphorica (Euphoriants and Narcotics such as Heroin)
- Hypnotica (Tranquilizers such as Kava)
- Phantastica (Hallucinogens or Entheogens such as Peyote or Ayahuasca)

== Works ==
Lewin was a prolific writer. Among his many essays may be mentioned:

- "Über Morphium-Intoxication" -- On Morphium intoxication (in "Deutsche Zeitschrift für Praktische Medizin", 1874)
- "Experimentelle Untersuchungen über die Wirkungen des Aconitin auf das Herz" -- Experimental analysis on the effects of Aconitine on the heart (in "Centralblatt für die Medizinische Wissenschaft", 1875)
- "Über die Verwertung des Alkohols in fieberhaften Krankheiten" -- On the application of alcohol with feverish maladies (in "Deutsches Archiv für Klinische Medizin", 1876)
- "Über maximale Dosen der Arzneimittel" -- On maximum doses of medicaments (in "Transactions of the International Medical Congress", 1887)
- "Über allgemeine Hautvergiftung durch Petroleum" -- On the broad eczema caused by petroleum (in Rudolf Virchow's "Archiv", 1888)
- "Über Anhalonium Lewinii und andere Cacteen" -- On Anhalonium lewinii and other cacti (in "Archiv für Experimentelle Pathologie und Pharmakologie", 1894)
- "Die Behandlung der Lepra" -- The treatment of leprosy (in "Deutsche Medizinische Wochenschrift", 1898)
- "Die Untersuchungen von Blutflecken" -- Analysis of hemangioma (in "Deutsche Medizinische Wochenschrift", 1899)
- "Die Vergiftungen in Betrieben" -- Intoxications at business (in "Deutsche Medizinische Wochenschrift", 1890)

Lewin is also the author of the following books:

- "Die Nebenwirkungen der Arzneimittellehre" -- Adverse reactions of pharmacology (Berlin, 1881)
- "Die Arzneimittel und ihre Dosierung : zum Gebrauche für Vorlesungen und die ärztliche Praxis" . Grosser, Berlin 1884 Digital edition by the University and State Library Düsseldorf
- "Lehrbuch der Toxikologie : für Aerzte, Studirende und Apotheker; mit 8 Holzschnitten u. 1 Taf." . Urban & Schwarzenberg, Wien [u.a.] 1885 Digital edition by the University and State Library Düsseldorf
- "Über Piper Methysticum (Kawa Kawa)" -- On Piper methysticum (Berlin, 1886)
- "Über Areca Catechu, Chavica Betle, und das Betelkauen" -- On Areca catechu, Piper betle and the chewing of Betel leaves (Stuttgart, 1889) (Digital edition by the University and State Library Düsseldorf)
- "Die Fruchtabtreibung durch Gifte und andere Mittel" -- Abortion by poisons and other remedies (Berlin)
- "Die Pfeilgifte : historische und experimentelle Untersuchungen" . Reimer, Berlin 1894 Digital edition by the University and State Library Düsseldorf
- "Lehrbuch der Toxikologie" . Urban & Schwarzenberg, Wien [u.a.] 2., vollst. neubearb. Aufl. 1897 Digital edition by the University and State Library Düsseldorf
- "Die Gifte in der Weltgeschichte : toxikologische, allgemeinverständliche Untersuchungen der historischen Quellen" . Springer, Berlin 1920 Digital edition by the University and State Library Düsseldorf

== See also ==
- List of psychedelic chemists
