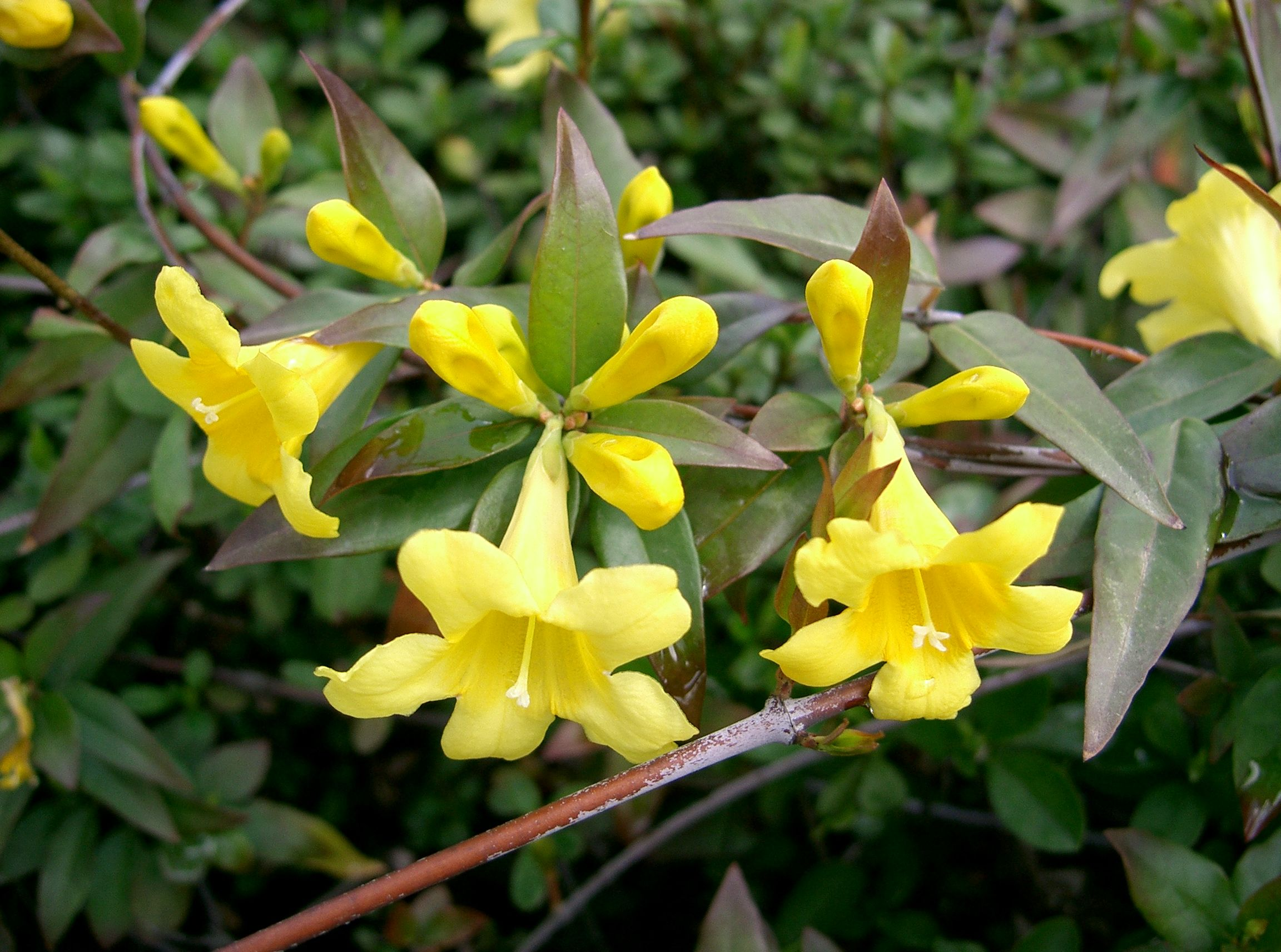
- Gelsemium sempervirens

Scientific classification
- Kingdom: Plantae
- Clade: Tracheophytes
- Clade: Angiosperms
- Clade: Eudicots
- Clade: Asterids
- Order: Gentianales
- Family: Gelsemiaceae; Struwe & V.A.Albert

Genera
- Gelsemium; Mostuea; Pteleocarpa

= Gelsemiaceae =

Family of plants

Gelsemiaceae is a family of flowering plants, belonging to the order Gentianales. The family contains only three genera: Gelsemium, Mostuea and Pteleocarpa. Gelsemium has three species, one native to Southeast Asia and southern China and two native to Central America, Mexico, and the southeastern United States. The eight species of Mostuea are native to tropical areas of South America, Africa, and Madagascar. The two genera were formerly classified in the family Loganiaceae. Pteleocarpa was originally placed in Boraginaceae or in its own family Pteleocarpaceae, but it is most closely related to Gelsemiaceae with which it shares significant characters.

The family Gelsemiaceae was described in 1994. It is distinguished by having no latex or stipules and by having heterostylous flowers with yellow to white corollas and superior ovaries.

In 2014, a molecular phylogenetic study of the lamiids (also known as Garryidae) resolved the anomalous genus Pteleocarpa as sister to (other) Gelsemiaceae. The authors of that study believe that Gelsemiaceae should be expanded to include Pteleocarpa. The APG IV system published in 2016 includes Pteleocarpa in Gelsemiaceae.
