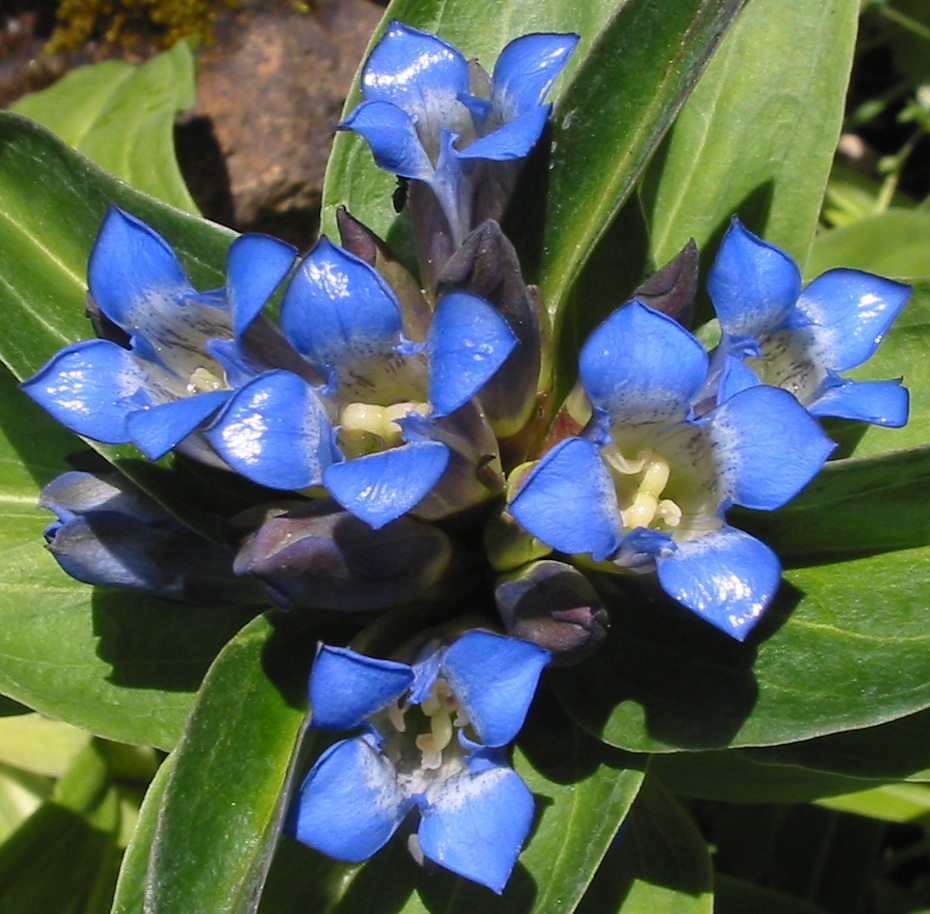
- Gentiana cruciata

Scientific classification
- Kingdom: Plantae
- Clade: Tracheophytes
- Clade: Angiosperms
- Clade: Eudicots
- Clade: Asterids
- Clade: Lamiids
- Order: Gentianales; Juss. ex Bercht. & J.Presl

Families
- Apocynaceae; Gelsemiaceae; Gentianaceae; Loganiaceae; Rubiaceae

Synonyms
- Apocynales Bercht. & J.Presl; Asclepiadales Bercht. & J.Presl; Chironiales Griseb.; Cinchonales Lindl.; Galiales Bromhead; Loganiales Lindl.; Lygodisodeales Mart.; Rubiales Bercht. & J.Presl; Strychnales Link; Theligonales Nakai; Vincales Horan.

= Gentianales =

Order of flowering plant

Gentianales is an order of flowering plant, included within the asterid clade of eudicots. It comprises more than 20,000 species in about 1,200 genera in 5 families. More than 80% of the species in this order belong to the family Rubiaceae.

Many of these flowering plants are used in traditional medicine. They have been used to treat pain, anxiety, cancers and neurological conditions.

According to molecular clock calculations, the lineage that led to Gentianales split from other plants about 108 million years ago or 81 million years ago.

== Taxonomy ==
In the classification system of Dahlgren the Gentiales were in the superorder Gentianiflorae (also called Gentiananae). The following families are included according to the APG III system:

- Family Apocynaceae (424 genera)
- Family Gelsemiaceae (2 genera)
- Family Gentianaceae (87 genera)
- Family Loganiaceae (13 genera)
- Family Rubiaceae (611 genera)

=== Phylogeny ===
The following phylogenetic tree is based on molecular phylogenetic studies of DNA sequences.

- Gentianales
  - Rubiaceae
  - - Gentianaceae
    - - Loganiaceae
      - - Apocynaceae
        - Gelsemiaceae

=== Etymology ===
It takes its name from the family Gentianaceae, which in turn is based on the name of the type genus, Gentiana. The genus name is a tribute to Gentius, an Illyrian king.

== Characteristics ==
This large order has a variety of different plants, ranging from small herbaceous plants and saprophytes to shrubs and large trees. Species are, however, united by their simple and opposite leaves and typically have showy pentamerous flowers (flowers in which components occur in multiples of five) and show nuclear endosperm formation (in which cell division takes place without the cell wall forming between divisions). Many species have structures between the leaf petioles, such as ridges or stipules. Many species also have colleters; thick hair-like structures that secrete mucilage, a thick gluey substance.

== Distribution ==
Species of this order are found in moist climates around the world. They are most common in tropical regions.

== Uses ==
Many gentianales contain toxic compounds and species have a variety of uses. Some species are also grown ornamentally. Well-known members of Gentianales are coffee, frangipani, Gardenia, gentian, oleander, and periwinkle.

Certain species belonging to the order Gentianales have been used in traditional medicine in rural southeastern Asia countries. Gelsemium sempervirens has been used in North American folk medicine to treat conditions such as anxiety, migraines/headaches, and neuralgia, while Gelsemium elegans has been used in China to treat rheumatoid arthritis pain, neuropathic pain, skin ulcers, and even cancers.

The compounds found in some species are used in the synthesis of modern medicines. Cinchona trees, for example, are a source of quinine, which is used to treat malaria. Vinblastine, which has anti-tumor properties as it disrupts cell division, is used in chemotherapy. It is extracted from the Madagascar periwinkle.
