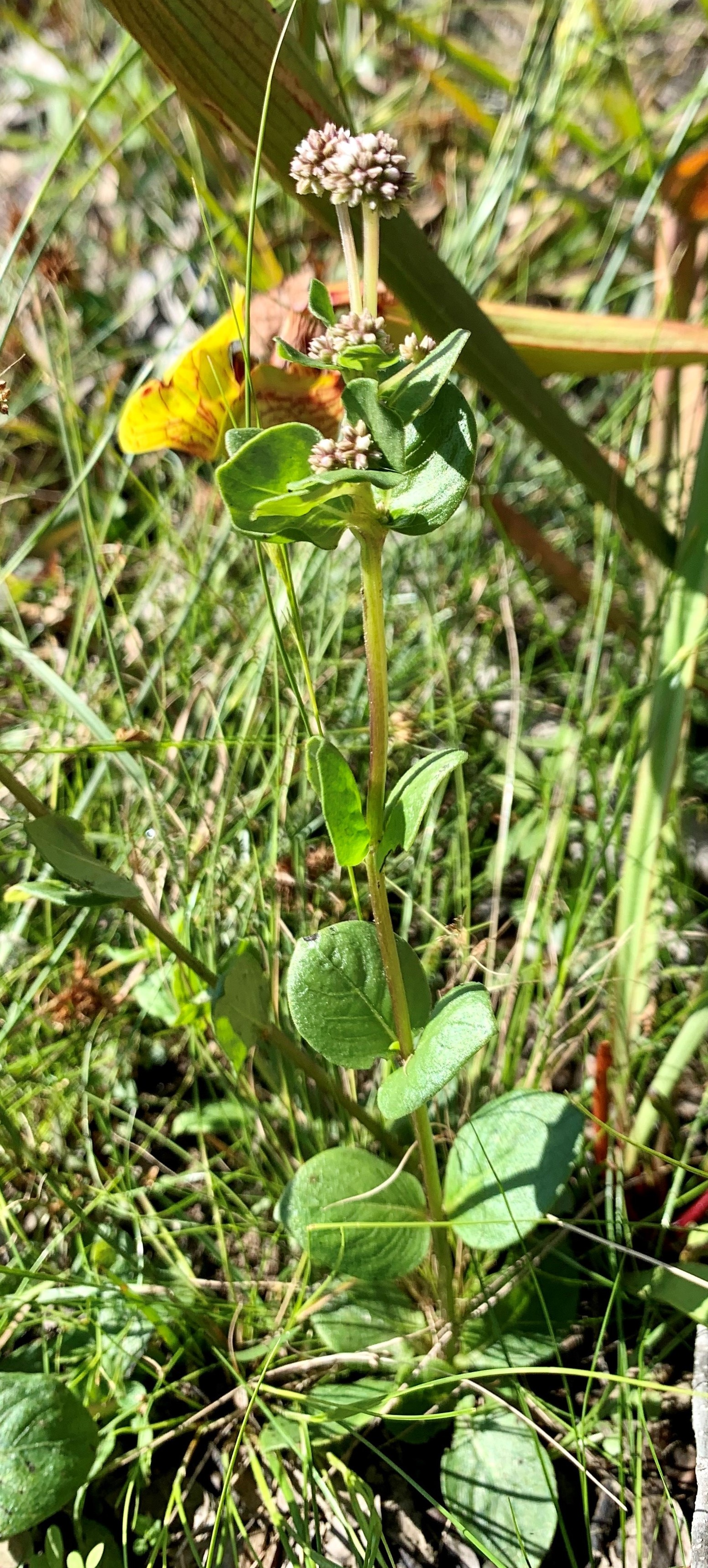

Scientific classification
- Kingdom: Plantae
- Clade: Tracheophytes
- Clade: Angiosperms
- Clade: Eudicots
- Clade: Asterids
- Order: Gentianales
- Family: Loganiaceae
- Genus: Mitreola
- Species: M. sessilifolia

Binomial name
- Mitreola sessilifolia (J.F.Gmel.) G.Don

Synonyms
- Cynoctonum angustifolium (Torr. & A.Gray) Small; Cynoctonum sessilifolium J.F.Gmel.; Cynoctonum sessilifolium var. angustifolium Torr. & A.Gray; Cynoctonum sessilifolium var. microphyllum R.W.Long; Mitreola angustifolia (Torr. & A.Gray) J.B.Nelson

= Mitreola sessilifolia =

Species of flowering plant

Mitreola sessilifolia, commonly known as swamp hornpod, is a species of small flowering plant in the genus Mitreola in the family Loganiaceae. The plant is native to the southeastern United States, but can be found as far west as Arizona. It was previously included in the genus Cynoctonum. It is also considered a facultative wetland species (FACW), which makes it an indicator species for wetlands, but may occur in non-wetland areas as well.

The flowers of this species are small, white, and funnelform, while the leaves are sessile with rounded bases. Most species in the genus Mitreola have leaves greater than 10mm long, however, this species has leaves greater than 6mm in length.
