= Schizacme archeri =

Scientific classification
- Kingdom: Plantae
- Clade: Tracheophytes
- Clade: Angiosperms
- Clade: Eudicots
- Clade: Asterids
- Order: Gentianales
- Family: Loganiaceae
- Genus: Schizacme
- Species: S. archeri

Binomial name
- Schizacme archeri (Hook.f.) Dunlop (1996)

Synonyms
- Mitrasacme archeri Hook.f. (1859)

Species of alpine flowering plant

Schizacme archeri is a common alpine cushion-forming plant species endemic to Tasmania, Australia. It grows mostly in the west of the state, south of Cradle Mountain and the Central Highlands. It was previously known as Mitrasacme archeri, but Schizame is now considered its own distinct genus.

S. archeri has firm, rigid, glossy, imbricate leaves which grow off the stem with pale or hyaline margins. The leaves measure to be 2-4mm long and 0.9-1.2mm wide. It can have white flowers which grow at the end of stems which are 0.2-2mm long. It generally flowers or fruits from October to May.

S. archeri can be distinguished from Schizacme montana and other cushion plants by its leaves. S. archeri has leaves that are circular and stacked together unlike other cushion plants. S. montana does not have translucent margins as S. archeri does.
