= Geniostoma trichostylum =

Conservation status
- Critically Endangered (IUCN 3.1)

Scientific classification
- Kingdom: Plantae
- Clade: Tracheophytes
- Clade: Angiosperms
- Clade: Eudicots
- Clade: Asterids
- Order: Gentianales
- Family: Loganiaceae
- Genus: Geniostoma
- Species: G. trichostylum

Binomial name
- Geniostoma trichostylum B.J.Conn

Species of flowering plant

Geniostoma trichostylum is a species of flowering plant in the family Loganiaceae.
