= Geniostoma rupestre var. glaberrimum =

Scientific classification
- Kingdom: Plantae
- Clade: Tracheophytes
- Clade: Angiosperms
- Clade: Eudicots
- Clade: Asterids
- Order: Gentianales
- Family: Loganiaceae
- Genus: Geniostoma
- Species: G. rupestre
- Variety: G. r. var. glaberrimum

Trinomial name
- Geniostoma rupestre var. glaberrimum (Benth.) B.J.Conn

Synonyms
- Synonymy: Geniostoma astylum A.Gray; Geniostoma crassifolium var. glaberrimum Benth.; Geniostoma deplanchei Vieill. ex Guillaumin; Geniostoma dictyoneurum A.C.Sm. & B.C.Stone; Geniostoma fluggeoides S.Moore; Geniostoma foetens Baill.; Geniostoma glaberrimum Hosok.; Geniostoma hendersonense H.St.John; Geniostoma hoeferi var. glabrum Gilg; Geniostoma insulare A.C.Sm. & B.C.Stone; Geniostoma insulare f. sphaerococcum A.C.Sm. & B.C.Stone; Geniostoma insulare var. tongense A.C.Sm. & B.C.Stone; Geniostoma longistylum Gilg-Ben.; Geniostoma micranthum DC.; Geniostoma micranthum var. paganense Fosberg; Geniostoma quadrangulare Fosberg; Geniostoma rupestre var. tongense (A.C.Sm. & B.C.Stone) B.J.Conn; Geniostoma saipanense Kaneh.; Geniostoma samoense Reinecke; Geniostoma sessile Kaneh.; Geniostoma vitiense Gilg & Gilg-Ben.

Species of plant

Geniostoma rupestre var. glaberrimum is a variety of flowering plant in the Loganiaceae family. It is a shrub or tree native to the Solomon Islands and western and southern Pacific islands.
