= Geniostoma gagnae =

Conservation status
- Endangered (IUCN 3.1)

Scientific classification
- Kingdom: Plantae
- Clade: Embryophytes
- Clade: Tracheophytes
- Clade: Angiosperms
- Clade: Eudicots
- Clade: Asterids
- Order: Gentianales
- Family: Loganiaceae
- Genus: Geniostoma
- Species: G. gagnae

Binomial name
- Geniostoma gagnae Fosberg & Sachet (1981)

Species of plant

Geniostoma gagnae is a species of flowering plant in the Loganiaceae family. It is a shrub endemic to the island of Fatu-Hiva in the Marquesas Islands of French Polynesia.
