= Geniostoma kaalae =

Conservation status
- Endangered (IUCN 2.3)

Scientific classification
- Kingdom: Plantae
- Clade: Tracheophytes
- Clade: Angiosperms
- Clade: Eudicots
- Clade: Asterids
- Order: Gentianales
- Family: Loganiaceae
- Genus: Geniostoma
- Species: G. kaalae

Binomial name
- Geniostoma kaalae (C.N.Forbes) K.L.Gibbons, B.J.Conn & Henwood

Synonyms
- Labordia kaalae C.N.Forbes

Species of plant

Geniostoma kaalae, the Waianae Range labordia, is a species of flowering plant in the Loganiaceae family.

It is endemic to the Waiʻanae Range on Oahu island in Hawaii.

It is an endangered species threatened by habitat loss.
