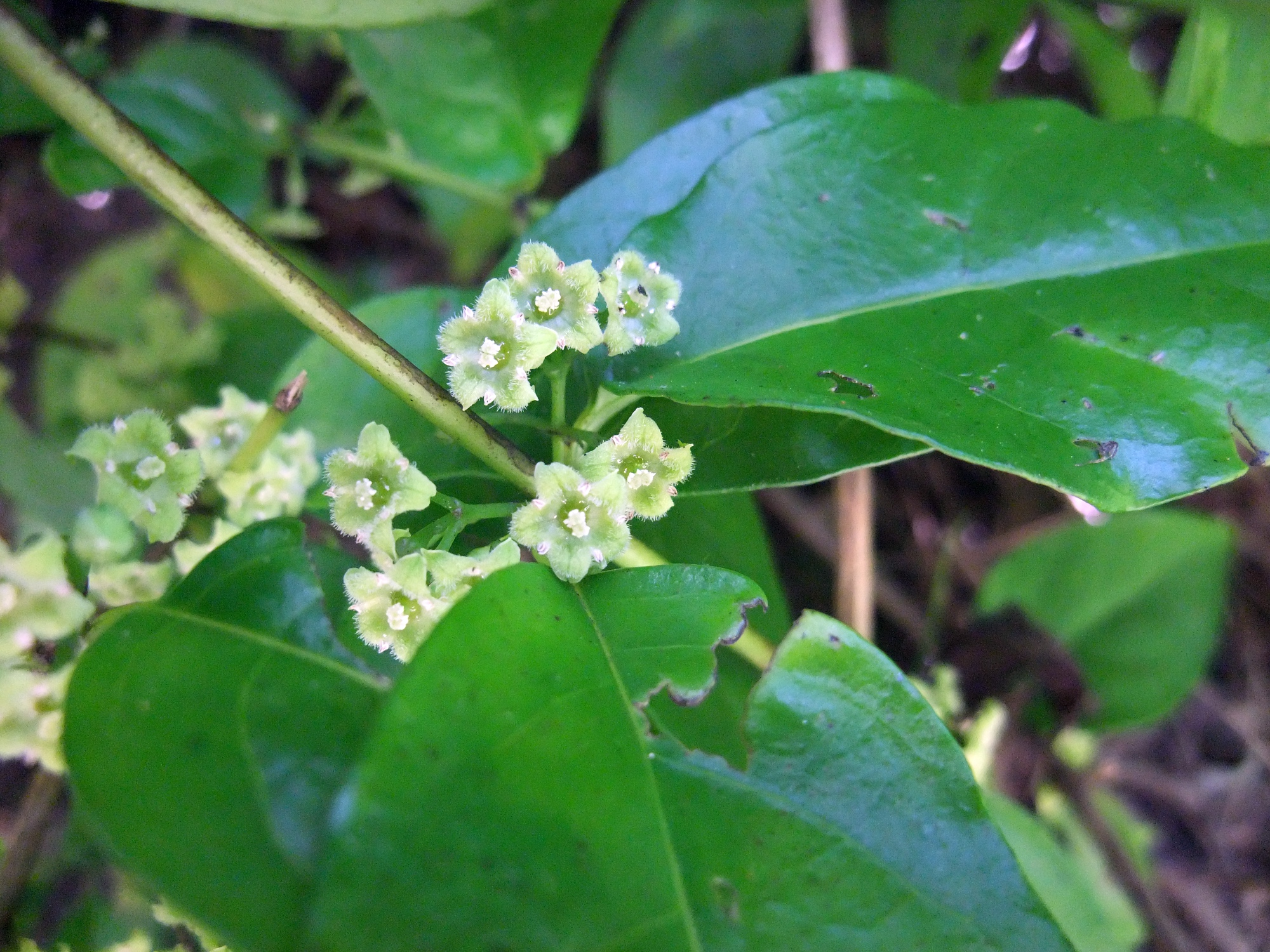

Conservation status
- Not Threatened (NZ TCS)

Scientific classification
- Kingdom: Plantae
- Clade: Tracheophytes
- Clade: Angiosperms
- Clade: Eudicots
- Clade: Asterids
- Order: Gentianales
- Family: Loganiaceae
- Genus: Geniostoma
- Species: G. rupestre
- Variety: G. r. var. ligustrifolium

Trinomial name
- Geniostoma rupestre var. ligustrifolium (A.Cunn.) B.J.Conn

Synonyms
- Geniostoma ligustrifolium A.Cunn.; Geniostoma ligustrifolium var. crassum Cheeseman; Geniostoma ligustrifolium var. major Cheeseman; Geniostoma rupestre var. crassum (Cheeseman) B.J.Conn

= Geniostoma rupestre var. ligustrifolium =

Variety of plant endemic to New Zealand

Geniostoma rupestre var. ligustrifolium, commonly known as hangehange, is a species of plant in the Loganiaceae family (syn. Geniostoma ligustrifolium). It is endemic to New Zealand, where it is found on the North Island, and in Marlborough at the northern tip of the South Island. Other common names are pāpā and privet leaf. A shrub common on forest margins, to 4 metres (13 ft) tall. It is popular as a garden specimen.
