= Mitrasacme paludosa =

- Herbarium specimen

Conservation status
- Least Concern (NCA)

Scientific classification
- Kingdom: Plantae
- Clade: Tracheophytes
- Clade: Angiosperms
- Clade: Eudicots
- Clade: Asterids
- Order: Gentianales
- Family: Loganiaceae
- Genus: Mitrasacme
- Species: M. paludosa

Binomial name
- Mitrasacme paludosa R.Br.

Synonyms
- Mitrasacme paludosa f. typica Domin; Mitrasacme diffusa Benth.; Mitrasacme paludosa f. diffusa (Benth.) Domin; Mitrasacme paludosa f. pilosula (F.Muell.) Domin; Mitrasacme pilosula F.Muell.

Species of flowering plant

Mitrasacme paludosa is a species of plant in the family Loganiaceae, native to Queensland and New South Wales, Australia. It is an annual or perennial herb which can grow up to 25 cm (9.8 in) tall. It grows in moist soils in heathland and eucalypt forest, at up to 1,600 m (5,200 ft) above sea level. It has a conservations status of least concern.
