= Geniostoma huttonii =

Scientific classification
- Kingdom: Plantae
- Clade: Tracheophytes
- Clade: Angiosperms
- Clade: Eudicots
- Clade: Asterids
- Order: Gentianales
- Family: Loganiaceae
- Genus: Geniostoma
- Species: G. huttonii

Binomial name
- Geniostoma huttonii B.J.Conn. (1993)

Species of plant

Geniostoma huttonii is a flowering plant in the Loganiaceae family. The specific epithet honours Ian Hutton who discovered the species in the course of his explorations of the Island.

== Description ==
It is a scrambling shrub, growing to 1 m in height. The ovate leaves are 2–3 cm long and 1–1.6 cm wide. The inflorescence is less than 1 cm long, bearing 1–3 very small flowers.

== Distribution and habitat ==
The plant is endemic to Australia’s subtropical Lord Howe Island in the Tasman Sea. It is rare and very local, being known only from the slopes of Mount Lidgbird.
