= Geniostoma lydgatei =

Conservation status
- Endangered (IUCN 3.1)

Scientific classification
- Kingdom: Plantae
- Clade: Tracheophytes
- Clade: Angiosperms
- Clade: Eudicots
- Clade: Asterids
- Order: Gentianales
- Family: Loganiaceae
- Genus: Geniostoma
- Species: G. lydgatei

Binomial name
- Geniostoma lydgatei (C.N.Forbes) Byng & Christenh. (2018)

Synonyms
- Labordia lydgatei C.N.Forbes (1916)

Species of plant

Geniostoma lydgatei, the Wahiawa Mountain labordia, is a species of flowering plant in the Loganiaceae family. It is endemic to the Hawaiian Islands, where it is present only in the Wahiawa Mountains of Kauai. It is threatened by habitat loss.
