= Geniostoma helleri =

Conservation status
- Critically Endangered (IUCN 3.1)

- Critically Imperiled (NatureServe)

Scientific classification
- Kingdom: Plantae
- Clade: Tracheophytes
- Clade: Angiosperms
- Clade: Eudicots
- Clade: Asterids
- Order: Gentianales
- Family: Loganiaceae
- Genus: Geniostoma
- Species: G. helleri

Binomial name
- Geniostoma helleri (Sherff) Byng & Christenh. (2018)

Synonyms
- Labordia helleri Sherff (1938)

Species of plant

Geniostoma helleri, the Nā Pali coast labordia or Heller's labordia, is a rare species of flowering plant in the Loganiaceae family. It is endemic to Hawaii, where it is found only on Kauai. It is a federally listed endangered species of the United States. Like other labordias, this plant is known as Kamakahala.

This is a shrub growing up to 4.5 meters tall. It may have climbing stems. The inflorescence is a cyme of 3 to 9 white or greenish yellow flowers.

This species was once found throughout Kauai, but today there are only 10 populations totalling no more than 550 plants. Most are within the Nā Pali Kona Forest Reserve and Kuia Natural Area Reserve.

This plant is threatened by feral ungulates, such as wild boars, which damage habitat by causing erosion. The habitat is also experiencing the introduction of invasive species of plants.
