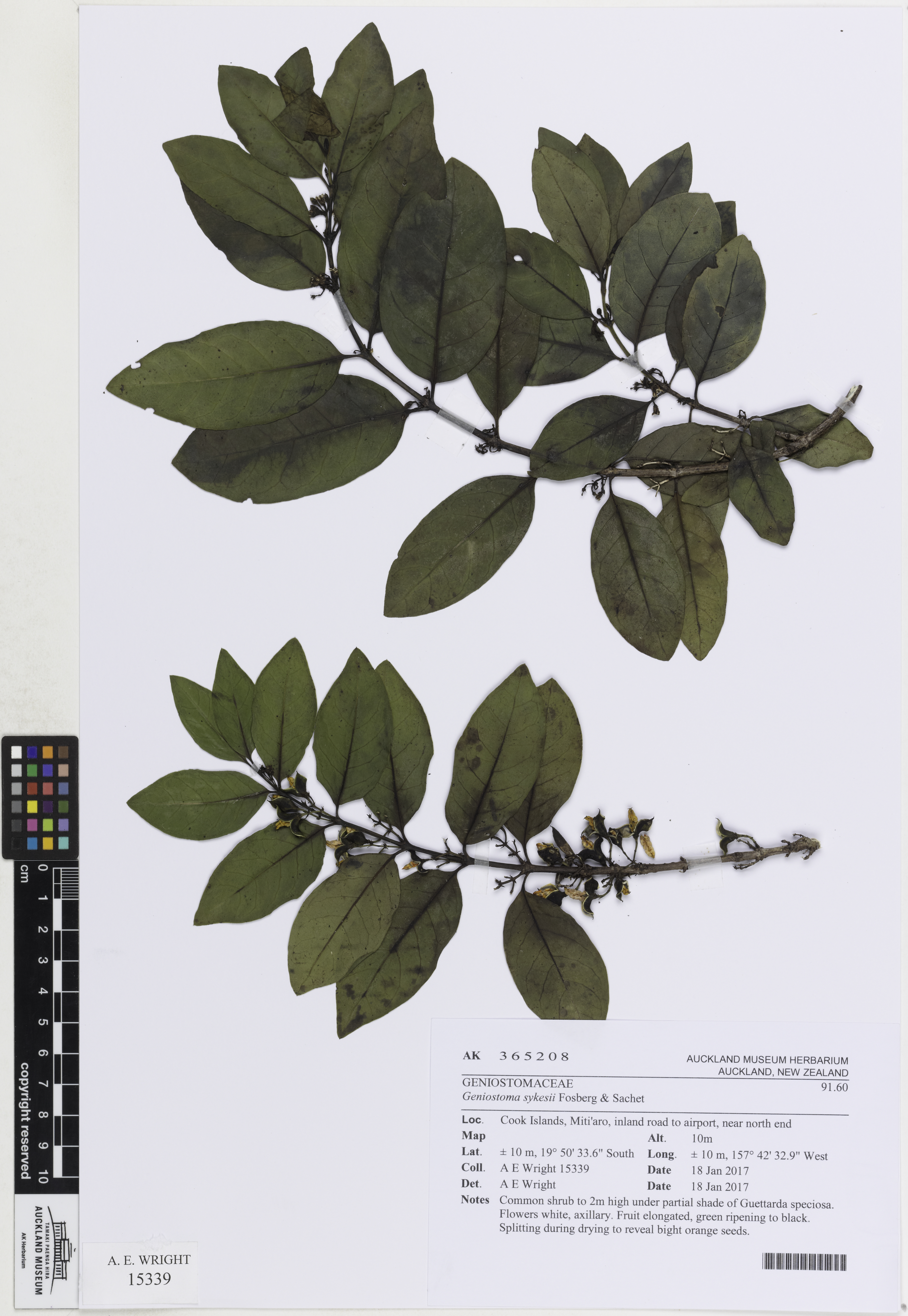
- Herbarium specimen from Auckland War Memorial Museum

Scientific classification
- Kingdom: Plantae
- Clade: Tracheophytes
- Clade: Angiosperms
- Clade: Eudicots
- Clade: Asterids
- Order: Gentianales
- Family: Loganiaceae
- Genus: Geniostoma
- Species: G. sykesii

Binomial name
- Geniostoma sykesii Fosberg & Sachet.

= Geniostoma sykesii =

Species of plant

Geniostoma sykesii (also known as Ange, or Makatea Geniostoma) is a species of flowering plant in the family Loganiaceae, endemic to the islands of Mangaia and Mitiaro in the Cook Islands. It grows on makatea (uplifted fossilised coral) terrain. Its dried leaves are used in ‘ei (floral necklaces), and used to scent multiple products.

== Description ==
Geniostoma sykesii grows to around two metres high. It is a small shrub. Its twigs are puberulent. The internodes are 1-4 centimetres long. When it becomes ripe, it changes color from green to black. Its seeds are bright orange.

== Distribution ==
Geniostoma sykesii is endemic to Mangaia and Mitiaro, which are both located in the Cook Islands. However, government studies have shown that the population of the plant is declining.

== Usage ==
Geniostoma sykesii has been commonly used for multiple reasons. It is mostly used to produce the scent of coconut oil, perfume, and garlands.
