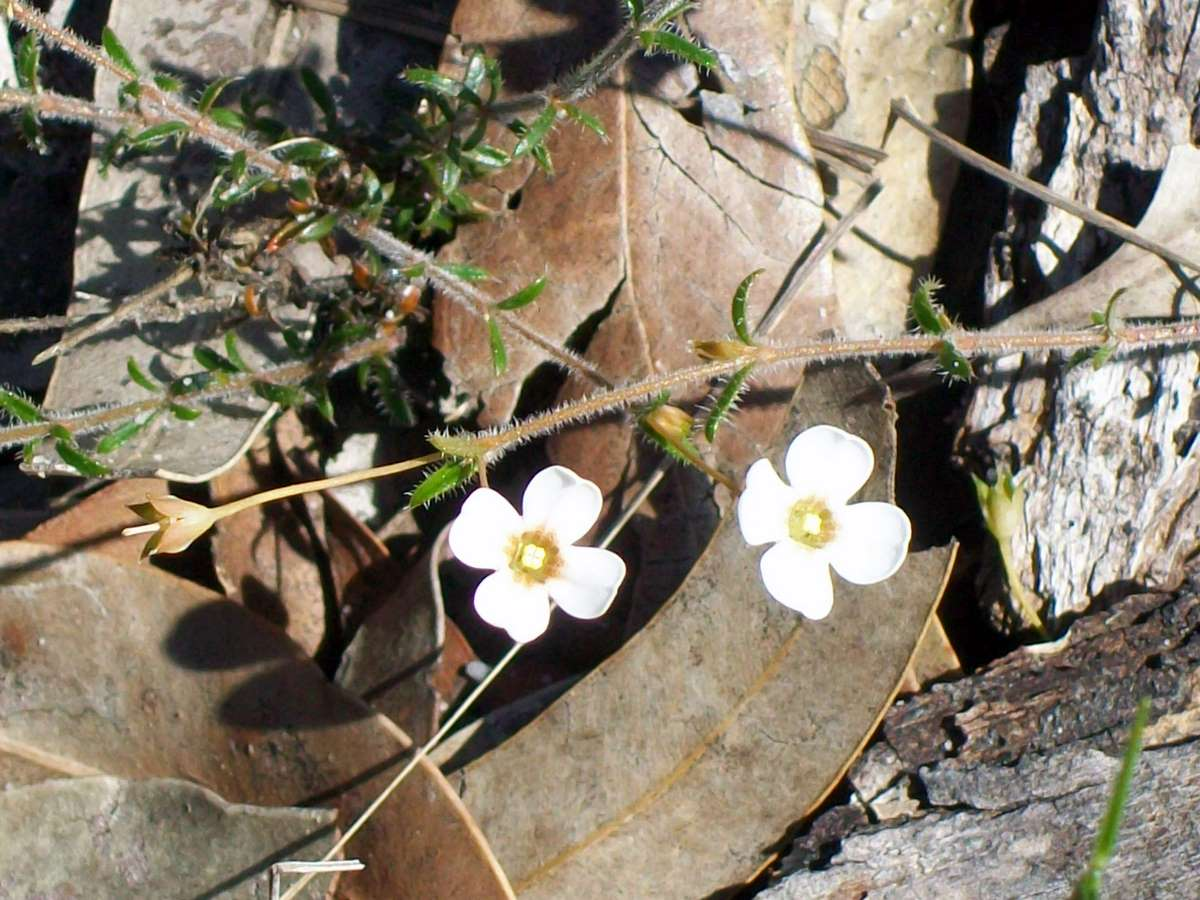
- Mitrasacme polymorpha at Ku-ring-gai Chase National Park, Australia

Scientific classification
- Kingdom: Plantae
- Clade: Tracheophytes
- Clade: Angiosperms
- Clade: Eudicots
- Clade: Asterids
- Order: Gentianales
- Family: Loganiaceae
- Genus: Mitrasacme
- Species: M. polymorpha

Binomial name
- Mitrasacme polymorpha R.Br.

Synonyms
- Mitrasacme canescens R.Br.; Mitrasacme cinerascens R.Br.; Mitrasacme hirsuta C.Presl; Mitrasacme sieberi DC.; Mitrasacme squarrosa R.Br.

= Mitrasacme polymorpha =

Species of plant

Mitrasacme polymorpha is a common perennial herb found in eastern and southern Australia. Often found near the coast on sandy soils in heathland, though also found at higher altitudes.

It grows to 15 cm tall, leaves 4 to 15 mm long, 1 to 6 mm wide. Four petaled white flowers form in spring to summer, on umbels at the end of the hairy branches. The fruiting capsule is 2 to 3 mm in diameter.
