= Geniostoma hirtellum =

Conservation status
- Least Concern (IUCN 3.1)

Scientific classification
- Kingdom: Plantae
- Clade: Tracheophytes
- Clade: Angiosperms
- Clade: Eudicots
- Clade: Asterids
- Order: Gentianales
- Family: Loganiaceae
- Genus: Geniostoma
- Species: G. hirtellum

Binomial name
- Geniostoma hirtellum (H.Mann) Byng & Christenh. (2018)

Synonyms
- Homotypic Synonyms: Labordia hirtella H.Mann; Heterotypic Synonyms: Labordia baillonii H.St.John; Labordia echitis Baill.; Labordia membranacea H.Mann; Labordia olympiana Sherff; Labordia pallida H.Mann; Labordia pallida var. hispidula Sherff; Labordia pedunculata Sherff; Labordia wawrana Sherff

Species of plant

Geniostoma hirtella is a species of flowering plant in the family Loganiaceae. It is sometimes referred to by the common name mountain labordia and is endemic to the Hawaiian Islands. It is threatened by habitat loss.
