= G. macrophyllum =

G. macrophyllum may refer to:

- Geniostoma macrophyllum, a plant species endemic to Fiji
- Geum macrophyllum, the largeleaf avens, a flowering plant found In Northern America
