= Norrisia =

Norrisia is the scientific name of two genera of organisms and may refer to:

- Norrisia (gastropod), a genus of snails in the family Tegulidae
- Norrisia (plant), a genus of plants in the family Loganiaceae
