= Mitreola =

Mitreola is the name of two genera of organisms and may refer to:

- Mitreola (gastropod), a genus of molluscs in the family Volutidae
- Mitreola (plant), a genus of molluscs in the family Loganiaceae
