= A. ovata =

A. ovata may refer to:

- Agathis ovata, a conifer species found only in New Caledonia
- Antonia ovata, a plant species
