= Geniostoma stipulare =

Conservation status
- Least Concern (IUCN 3.1)

Scientific classification
- Kingdom: Plantae
- Clade: Tracheophytes
- Clade: Angiosperms
- Clade: Eudicots
- Clade: Asterids
- Order: Gentianales
- Family: Loganiaceae
- Genus: Geniostoma
- Species: G. stipulare

Binomial name
- Geniostoma stipulare A.C.Sm. & B.C.Stone

Species of plant

Geniostoma stipulare is a species of flowering plant in the Loganiaceae family. It is a shrub or tree endemic to Fiji.

The species was described by Albert Charles Smith and Benjamin Clemens Stone in 1962.
