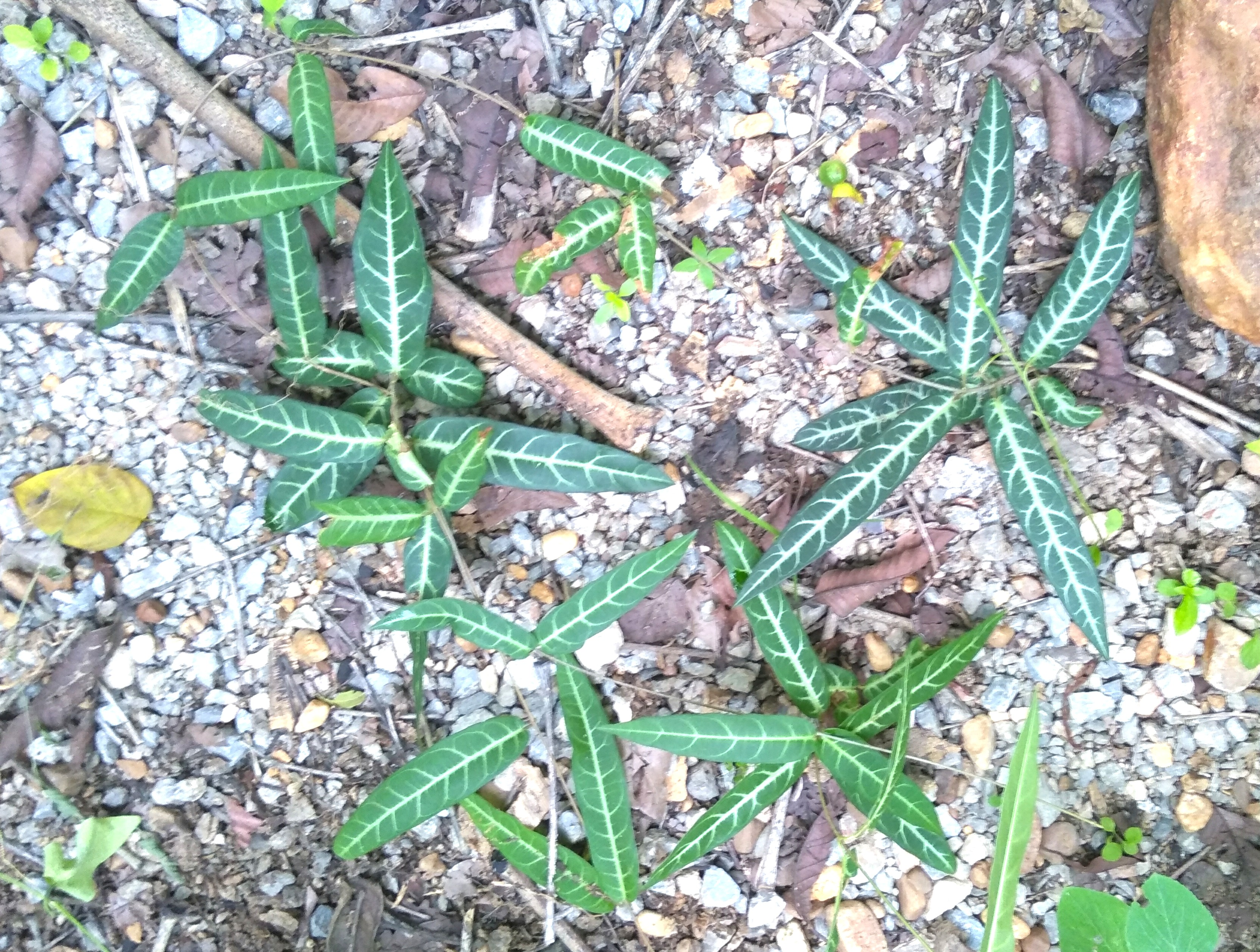

Scientific classification
- Kingdom: Plantae
- Clade: Tracheophytes
- Clade: Angiosperms
- Clade: Eudicots
- Clade: Asterids
- Order: Gentianales
- Family: Loganiaceae
- Genus: Gardneria
- Species: G. multiflora

Binomial name
- Gardneria multiflora Makino

Synonyms
- Homotypic Synonyms: Pseudogardneria multiflora (Makino) Pamp.; Heterotypic Synonyms: Gardneria chinensis Nakai; Gardneria hongkongensis Hayata; Gardneria shimadae Hayata; Rhamnus pasteurii H.Lév.; Sabia esquirolii H.Lév.

= Gardneria multiflora =

Species of plant

Gardneria multiflora (Thai: พญารากหอม) is a species of flowering plant belonging to the family Loganiaceae. It is native to North Central China, South Central China, Southeast China, Japan, and Taiwan.

It grows as a creeper in dense forests in its natural habitat. It has uses as a medicinal plant, especially the roots and leaves.

Alkaloids believed to have been identified include 18-Demethoxygardfloramine & 18-Demethoxygardneramine.
