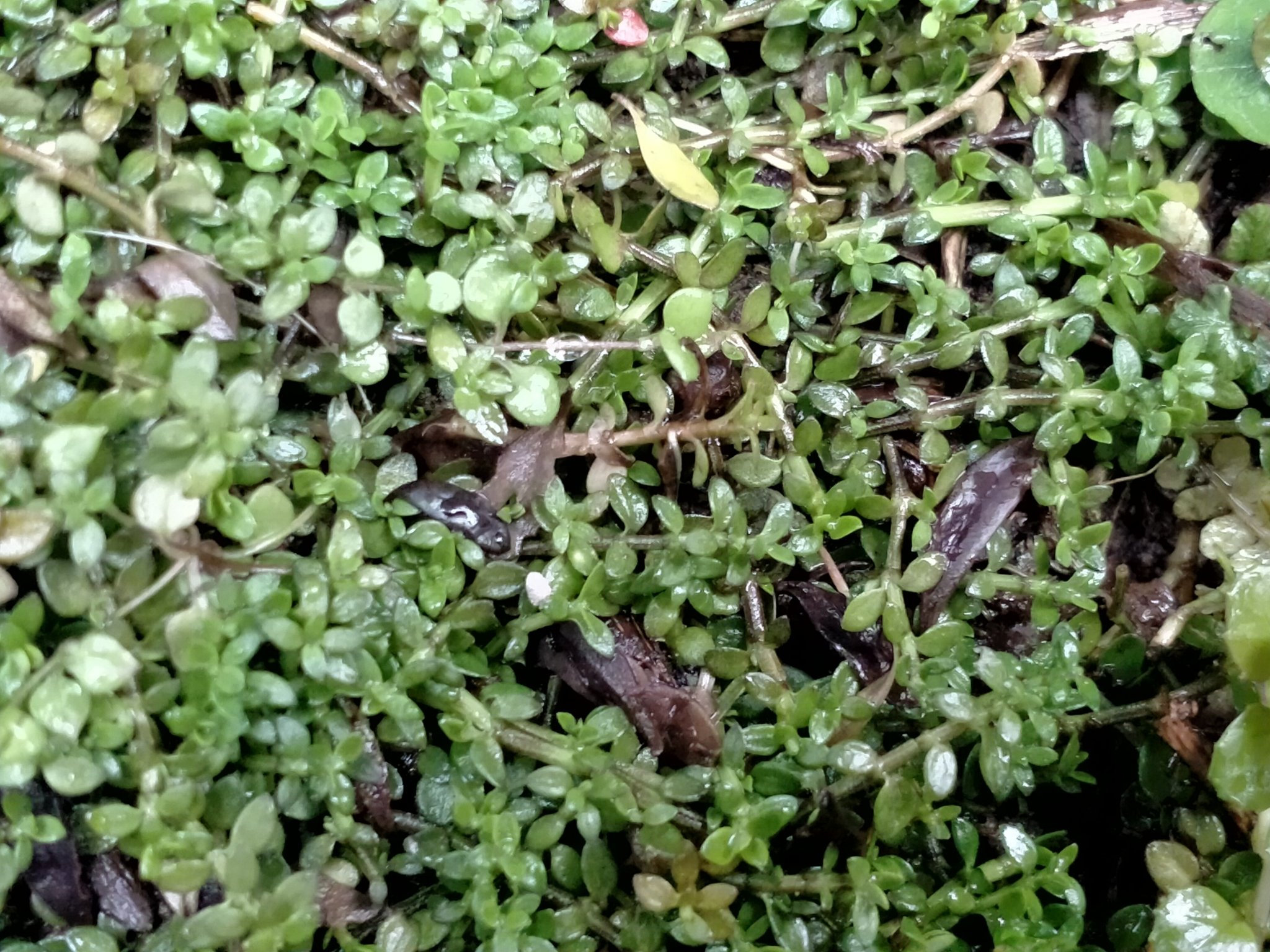
- Tetrachondra hamiltonii in New Zealand

Scientific classification
- Kingdom: Plantae
- Clade: Embryophytes
- Clade: Tracheophytes
- Clade: Spermatophytes
- Clade: Angiosperms
- Clade: Eudicots
- Clade: Asterids
- Order: Lamiales
- Family: Tetrachondraceae
- Genus: Tetrachondra; Petrie (1892)

Species
- Tetrachondra hamiltonii; Tetrachondra patagonica

= Tetrachondra =

Genus of flowering plants

Tetrachondra is a plant genus in the family Tetrachondraceae. It comprises two species of creeping succulent, perennial, aquatic or semi-aquatic herbaceous plants. Its distribution range is disjunct: one species is endemic to New Zealand (mainly Stewart Island, Otago and Southland) while the other one is endemic to southern Patagonia and Tierra del Fuego. These plants bear essential oils.

== Description ==
=== Leaves ===
The leaves stem short and erect from prostrate rooting stems. They are simple, opposite leaves, with aromatic glands and no stipule. The leaves are connate by flattened petioles. The lamina is simple, minutely denticulate on the margin, and leathery on the surface.

=== Flower ===
Flowers are solitary and can be axillary or terminal. They are tetramerous, without free hypanthium. There are a distinct calyx, which consists of 4 fused sepals, and a distinct corolla, consisting of 4 fused petals.

The androecium consists of 4 free, epipetalous stamens, all of which are fertile. The stamens alternate with the corolla lobes. The anthers are dorsifixed and introrse. Pollen grains are aperturate and colporate.

The gynoecium consists of 2 carpels. Each carpel is deeply lobed, giving the impression that there are in fact 4 carpels, ostensibly isomerous with the perianth. The ovary is syncarpous and have either 4 or 2 locules, each one housing 1 or 2 anatropous ovules. Stigmas are inconspicuous. The placentation mode is basal.

=== Fruit and seed ===
The fruit is a schizocarp associated with 4, one-seeded, setulose nutlets. The seeds are extensively endospermic.

== Reproduction ==
These plants are hermaphrodites.

== Alternative and previous classification ==
Tetrachondra is also variously ascribed to families Lamiaceae (such as in the Cronquist system or the Dahlgren system) and Scrophulariaceae.

== See also ==
- Polypremum, a closely related genus
