= Geniostoma petiolosum =

Scientific classification
- Kingdom: Plantae
- Clade: Tracheophytes
- Clade: Angiosperms
- Clade: Eudicots
- Clade: Asterids
- Order: Gentianales
- Family: Loganiaceae
- Genus: Geniostoma
- Species: G. petiolosum

Binomial name
- Geniostoma petiolosum C.Moore & F.Muell. (1869)

Species of plant

Geniostoma petiolosum, commonly known as boar tree, is a flowering plant in the Loganiaceae family. The specific epithet refers to the relatively long and narrow petioles.

== Description ==
It is a shrub or small tree, growing to 5 m in height. The lanceolate-elliptic leaves are 5.5–14 cm long and 2–4.5 cm wide. The inflorescences are clustered, 1–2 cm long, bearing 5–20 small flowers. The ovoid-globose capsules, 6–7 mm long, contain small, black seeds in yellow pulp.

== Distribution and habitat ==
The plant is endemic to Australia's subtropical Lord Howe Island in the Tasman Sea. It is an uncommon inhabitant of sheltered forest throughout the Island, especially at lower elevations.
