= Geniostoma rapense =

Conservation status
- Critically Endangered (IUCN 3.1)

Scientific classification
- Kingdom: Plantae
- Clade: Embryophytes
- Clade: Tracheophytes
- Clade: Angiosperms
- Clade: Eudicots
- Clade: Asterids
- Order: Gentianales
- Family: Loganiaceae
- Genus: Geniostoma
- Species: G. rapense

Binomial name
- Geniostoma rapense F.Br. (1931)

Species of plant

Geniostoma rapense is a species of plant in the Loganiaceae family. It is a shrub endemic to the island of Rapa Iti in the Tubuai Islands of French Polynesia.
