= Geniostoma cyrtandrae =

Conservation status
- Critically Endangered (IUCN 3.1)

Scientific classification
- Kingdom: Plantae
- Clade: Tracheophytes
- Clade: Angiosperms
- Clade: Eudicots
- Clade: Asterids
- Order: Gentianales
- Family: Loganiaceae
- Genus: Geniostoma
- Species: G. cyrtandrae

Binomial name
- Geniostoma cyrtandrae Baill. (1880)

Synonyms
- Labordia cyrtandrae (Baill.) Skottsb. (1935 publ. 1936); Labordia hypoleuca O.Deg. (1932)

Species of plant

Geniostoma cyrtandrae, the Koʻolau Range labordia, is a species of flowering plant in the Loganiaceae family. It is endemic to lowland tropical moist forests in Hawaiʻi, and is threatened by habitat loss. Like other labordias, this plant is known as Kamakahala.

This species has been known from the Koʻolau and Waianae Ranges of Oahu. Today there are two individuals remaining in the Koʻolau Range, only one of which is mature, and 44 mature plants remain in the Waianae Range.
