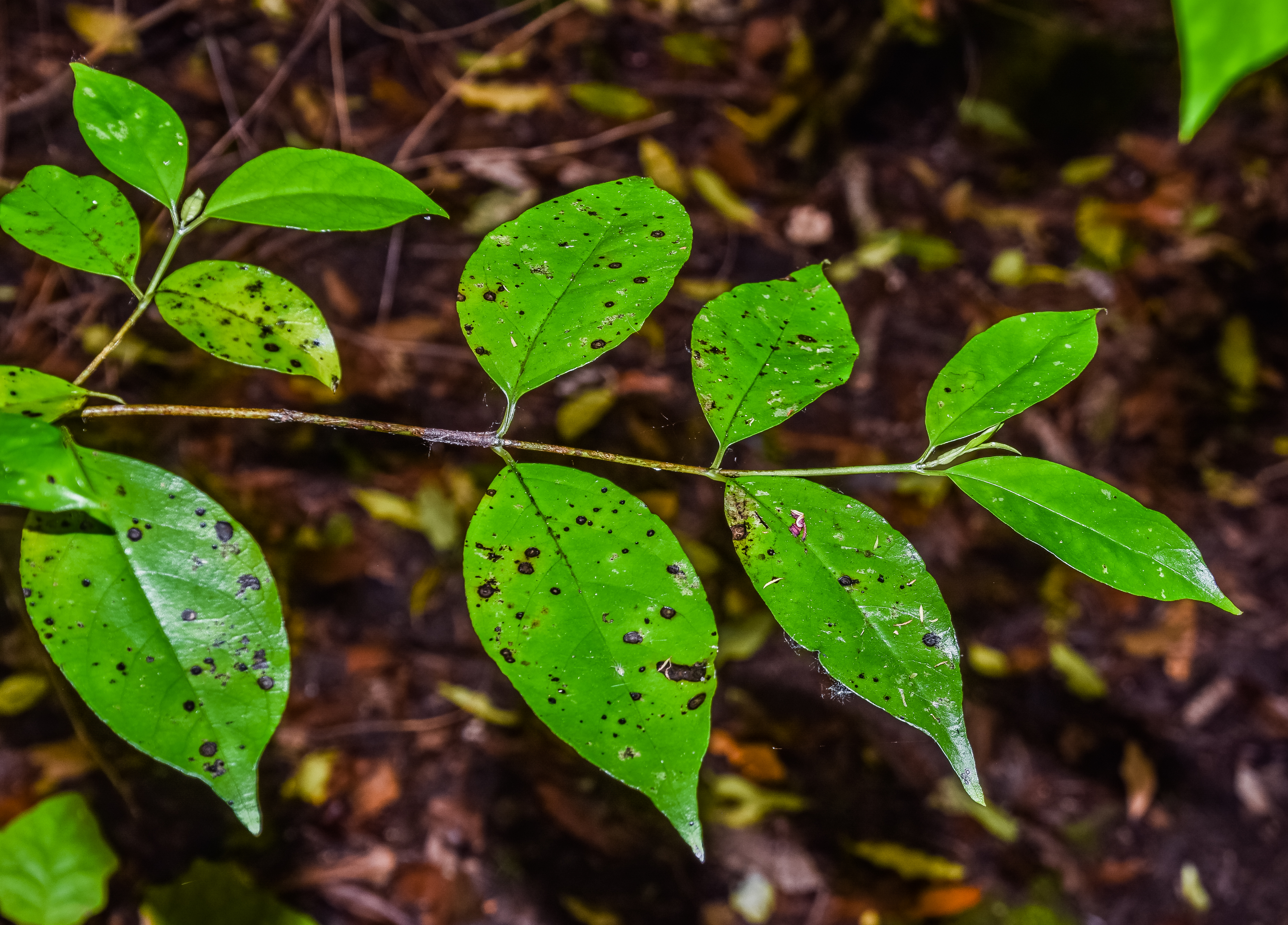

Conservation status
- Least Concern (IUCN 3.1)

Scientific classification
- Kingdom: Plantae
- Clade: Embryophytes
- Clade: Tracheophytes
- Clade: Angiosperms
- Clade: Eudicots
- Clade: Asterids
- Order: Gentianales
- Family: Loganiaceae
- Genus: Geniostoma
- Species: G. rupestre

Binomial name
- Geniostoma rupestre J.R.Forst. & G.Forst. (1776)

Varieties
- 10; see text

Synonyms
- Synonymy: synonyms of var. australianum: Geniostoma australianum F.Muell. synonyms of var. crassifolium: Geniostoma crassifolium Benth.; Geniostoma franguloides Brongn. & Gris ex Guillaumin, not validly publ.; Geniostoma pancheri Baill.; Geniostoma phyllanthoides Baill. synonyms of var. hoeferi: Geniostoma hoeferi Gilg & Gilg-Ben.; Geniostoma micranthum var. hoeferi (Gilg & Gilg-Ben.) Fosberg synonyms of var. lasiostemon: Geniostoma batanense Merr.; Geniostoma brevipes Merr.; Geniostoma celebicum Valeton; Geniostoma dallmannense Kaneh. & Hatus.; Geniostoma fasciculatum Quisumb. & Merr.; Geniostoma kusaiense Kaneh.; Geniostoma lancilimbum Merr.; Geniostoma lasiostemon Blume; Geniostoma lasiostemon var. moluccanum Blume; Geniostoma laxum Elmer; Geniostoma miquelianum Koord. & Valeton; Geniostoma moluccanum Valeton; Geniostoma oblongifolium Koord. & Valeton; Geniostoma pulgarense Elmer; Geniostoma ramosii Merr.; Geniostoma rupestre var. moluccanum (Blume) B.J.Conn; Lasiostemum arboreum Zipp. ex Blume synonyms of var. ligustrifolium: Geniostoma ligustrifolium A.Cunn.; Geniostoma ligustrifolium var. crassum Cheeseman; Geniostoma ligustrifolium var. major Cheeseman; Geniostoma rupestre var. crassum (Cheeseman) B.J.Conn synonyms of var. rupestre: Geniostoma acuminatissimum Gilg & Gilg-Ben.; Geniostoma arboreum (Reinw. ex Blume) Kuntze; Geniostoma avene Valeton; Geniostoma biseriale Rech.; Geniostoma brassii Merr. & L.M.Perry; Geniostoma caulocarpum K.Schum.; Geniostoma clavigerum A.C.Sm. & B.C.Stone; Geniostoma confertiflorum A.C.Sm. & B.C.Stone; Geniostoma cumingianum Benth.; Geniostoma dasyneurum Gilg & Gilg-Ben.; Geniostoma fleischmannii Rech.; Geniostoma gilgii Merr. & L.M.Perry; Geniostoma gracile Rech.; Geniostoma haemospermum Steud., nom. illeg. homonym. post.; Geniostoma haemospermum var. angustifolium Blume; Geniostoma haemospermum var. elongatum Blume; Geniostoma haemospermum var. erosum Blume; Geniostoma haemospermum var. laevigatum Blume; Geniostoma haemospermum var. rugulosum Blume; Geniostoma insulare f. cuspidatum A.C.Sm. & B.C.Stone; Geniostoma kasyotense Kaneh. & Sasaki; Geniostoma longipes Merr.; Geniostoma macgregorii (Horne ex Baker) A.C.Sm. & B.C.Stone; Geniostoma microphyllum Seem.; Geniostoma mindanaense Elmer; Geniostoma montanum Zoll. & Moritzi; Geniostoma nigrescens (Blanco) Merr.; Geniostoma pachyphyllum Merr.; Geniostoma philippinense Merr.; Geniostoma psychotrioides Gilg & Gilg-Ben.; Geniostoma pullei Cammerl.; Geniostoma reticulatum Blume; Geniostoma schlechteri Gilg & Gilg-Ben.; Geniostoma stenocarpum A.C.Sm.; Geniostoma stenophyllum Merr.; Geniostoma stenophyllum Gilg & Gilg-Ben., nom. illeg. homonym. post.; Geniostoma stenurum Gilg & Gilg-Ben.; Geniostoma uninervium A.C.Sm. & B.C.Stone; Haemospermum arboreum Reinw. ex Blume; Haemospermum moluccanum Zipp. ex Blume; Lasiostomum arboreum Zipp. ex Blume; Tayotum nigrescens Blanco; Plectronia macgregorii Horne ex Baker synonyms of var. thymeleaceum: Geniostoma thymeleaceum Baill.

= Geniostoma rupestre =

Species of flowering plant

Geniostoma rupestre is a species of flowering plant in the family Loganaceae. It is a shrub or tree which ranges from Taiwan and Malesia to Papuasia, Queensland (Australia), New Zealand, and the western and central Pacific islands.

Geniostoma rupestre is a shrub or small tree from 2 to 5 meters tall, and occasionally up to 12 meters tall. It grows in both primary and secondary tropical moist forests, often in open areas in secondary forests, from sea level to 2,800 meters elevation. Plants often have a straggling form in the forest shade, with more dense and compact growth in open sunny areas.

== Varieties ==
Ten varieties are accepted.

- Geniostoma rupestre var. australianum (F.Muell.) B.J.Conn – northeastern Queensland
- Geniostoma rupestre var. crassifolium (Benth.) B.J.Conn – New Caledonia
- Geniostoma rupestre var. glaberrimum (Benth.) B.J.Conn – Solomon Islands, southwest Pacific, Caroline Islands, Marianas, Society Islands, and Tubuai Islands
- Geniostoma rupestre var. hoeferi (Gilg & Gilg-Ben.) B.J.Conn – Caroline Islands and Marianas
- Geniostoma rupestre var. lasiostemon (Blume) ined. – Malesia, New Guinea, and Caroline Islands
- Geniostoma rupestre var. ligustrifolium (A.Cunn.) B.J.Conn – hangehange – New Zealand
- Geniostoma rupestre var. rouffaeranum B.J.Conn – New Guinea
- Geniostoma rupestre var. rupestre – Taiwan (Lan Yü and Lü Dao), Malesia, Papuasia, northwestern and southwestern Pacific islands
- Geniostoma rupestre var. solomonense B.J.Conn – Solomon Islands
- Geniostoma rupestre var. thymeleaceum (Baill.) B.J.Conn – New Caledonia
