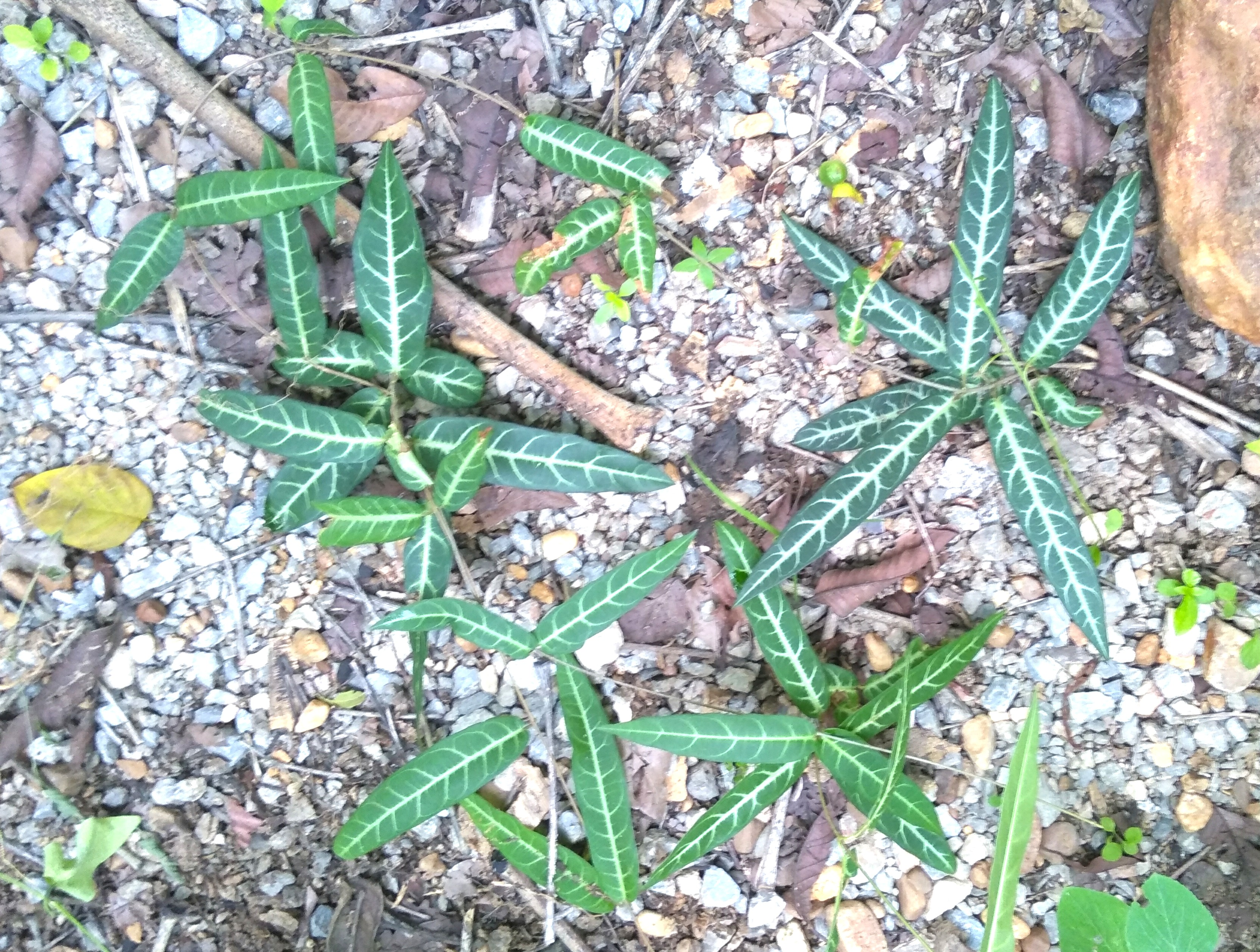
- Gardneria multiflora

Scientific classification
- Kingdom: Plantae
- Clade: Tracheophytes
- Clade: Angiosperms
- Clade: Eudicots
- Clade: Asterids
- Order: Gentianales
- Family: Loganiaceae
- Genus: Gardneria; Wall.

Synonyms
- Pseudogardneria Racib.

= Gardneria =

Genus of plants

Gardneria is a genus of flowering plants belonging to the family Loganiaceae.

Its native range is Himalaya to Japan and Java. It is found in the regions of Assam, Bangladesh, China, Eastern Himalaya, India, Japan, Jawa, Korea, Malaya, Myanmar, Nansei-shoto, Sri Lanka, Sumatera, Taiwan, Thailand, Tibet, Vietnam and Western Himalaya.

The genus name of Gardneria is in honour of Edward Gardner (1784–1861), English colonial administrator at the court of the raja of Nepal, and it was first described and published in W.Roxburgh's Flora Indica Vol.1 on page 400 in 1820.

Known species:

- Gardneria angustifolia Wall.
- Gardneria lanceolata Rehder & E.H.Wilson
- Gardneria multiflora Makino
- Gardneria nutans Siebold & Zucc.
- Gardneria ovata Wall.
