= Usteria =

Scientific classification
- Kingdom: Plantae
- Clade: Tracheophytes
- Clade: Angiosperms
- Clade: Eudicots
- Clade: Asterids
- Order: Gentianales
- Family: Loganiaceae
- Genus: Usteria; Willd.

Synonyms
- Monodynamis J.F.Gmel. (nom. illeg.)

Genus of plants

Usteria Dennst. is a synonym of the Euphorbiaceae genus Acalypha. Usteria Medik. is a synonym of the Hyacinthaceae genus Hyacinthoides.

Usteria is a plant genus in the family Loganiaceae. It was established in 1790 by Carl Ludwig Willdenow.

Species

- Usteria guineensis
