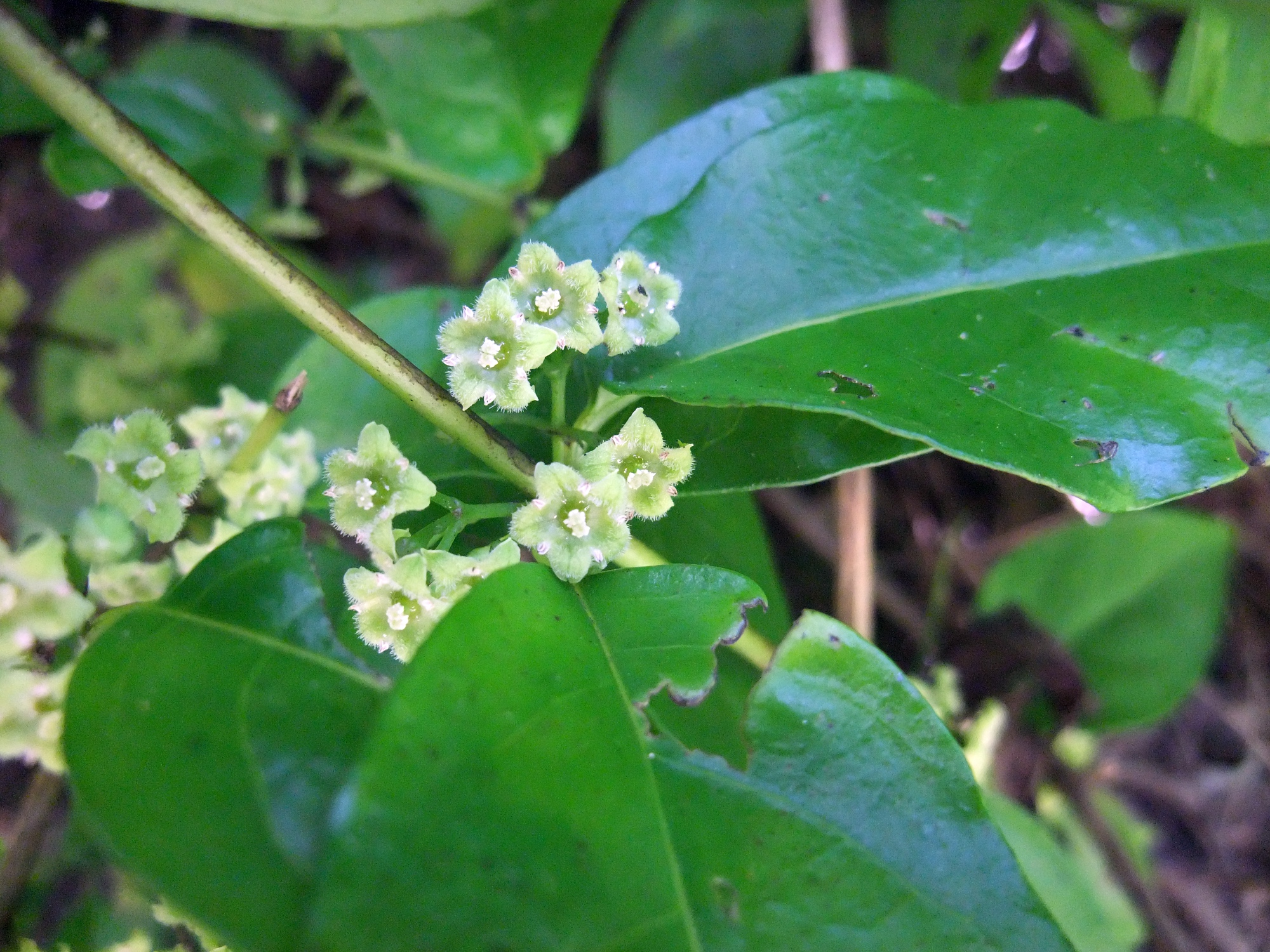
- Geniostoma rupestre var. ligustrifolium

Scientific classification
- Kingdom: Plantae
- Clade: Embryophytes
- Clade: Tracheophytes
- Clade: Angiosperms
- Clade: Eudicots
- Clade: Asterids
- Order: Gentianales
- Family: Loganiaceae
- Genus: Geniostoma; J.R.Forst. & G.Forst. (1776)

Synonyms
- Anasser Juss. (1789); Aspilobium Sol. ex A.Cunn. (1838); Haemospermum Reinw. ex Blume (1827); Labordia Gaudich. (1829); Lasiostomum Zipp. ex Blume (1850); Nautophylla Guillaumin (1953); Tayotum Blanco (1837)

= Geniostoma =

Genus of plants

Geniostoma is a genus of around 49 species of flowering plants in the family Loganiaceae. They are shrubs or small trees, with inflorescences borne in the axils of the simple, petiolate, oppositely-arranged leaves. The flowers are arranged in cymes, and each is pentamerous.

The name Geniostoma derives from the Greek words γένειον (geneion; "beard") and στόμα (stoma; "mouth"), referring to the hairs in the corolla tube of some species. The genus is widely distributed across the Pacific Ocean from Japan, Malesia to Australia in the west, and east to the Tuamotu Archipelago; one species is also found on the Mascarene Islands.

The Hawaiian endemic genus Labordia is included in Geniostoma by Plants of the World Online and other authors. The Hawaiian species are commonly known as labordias or as kamakahala in Hawaiian. These two genera have been grouped together in the family "Geniostomaceae", but are considered by the Angiosperm Phylogeny Group to be part of a wider Loganiaceae.

== Species ==
49 species are accepted.

- Geniostoma angustifolium Bouton ex DC. – Mascarene Islands
- Geniostoma antherotrichum Gilg & Gilg-Ben. – New Guinea
- Geniostoma balansanum Baill. – New Caledonia
- Geniostoma borbonicum (Lam.) Spreng. – Mascarene Islands
- Geniostoma calcicola A.C.Sm. – Fiji (Fulaga)
- Geniostoma celastrineum Baill. – New Caledonia
- Geniostoma clavatum J.W.Moore – Society Islands (Raiatea: Mt. Temehani)
- Geniostoma cyrtandrae Baill. – Hawaiian Islands
- Geniostoma degeneri (Sherff) Byng & Christenh. – Hawaiian Islands
- Geniostoma densiflorum Baill. – New Caledonia and Vanuatu
- Geniostoma erythrospermum Baill. – New Caledonia
- Geniostoma fagraeoides Benth. – Ogasawara Islands
- Geniostoma gagnae Fosberg & Sachet – Marquesas Islands
- Geniostoma gaudichaudii B.J.Conn – Hawaiian Islands
- Geniostoma glaucescens Schltr. – New Caledonia
- Geniostoma grandifolium B.J.Conn – Vanuatu
- Geniostoma hallei Fosberg & Sachet – Marquesas Islands
- Geniostoma hedyosmifolium (Baill.) Byng & Christenh. – Hawaiian Islands
- Geniostoma helleri (Sherff) Byng & Christenh. – Hawaiian Islands
- Geniostoma hirtellum (H.Mann) Byng & Christenh. – Hawaiian Islands
- Geniostoma hosakanum (Sherff) Byng & Christenh. – Hawaiian Islands
- Geniostoma huttonii B.J.Conn – Lord Howe Island
- Geniostoma hymenopodum (O.Deg. & Sherff) Byng & Christenh. – Hawaiian Islands
- Geniostoma imbricatum (Guillaumin) C.S.P.Foster & B.J.Conn – New Caledonia
- Geniostoma kaalae (C.N.Forbes) K.L.Gibbons, B.J.Conn & Henwood – Hawaiian Islands
- Geniostoma leenhoutsii B.J.Conn – eastern New Guinea and Bougainville Island
- Geniostoma lorencianum (K.R.Wood, W.L.Wagner & T.J.Motley) Byng & Christenh. – Hawaiian Islands
- Geniostoma lydgatei (C.N.Forbes) Byng & Christenh. – Hawaiian Islands
- Geniostoma macrophyllum Gillespie – Fiji
- Geniostoma mooreanum B.J.Conn – New Caledonia (Î Lifou)
- Geniostoma novae-caledoniae Vieill. ex Baill. – New Caledonia
- Geniostoma pedunculatum Bouton – Mascarene Islands
- Geniostoma petiolosum C.Moore & F.Muell. – Lord Howe Island
- Geniostoma pumilum (Hillebr.) Byng & Christenh. – Hawaiian Islands
- Geniostoma randianum Merr. & L.M.Perry – New Guinea
- Geniostoma rapense F.Br. – Tubuai Islands (Rapa Iti)
- Geniostoma rarotongense Fosberg & Sachet – Cook Islands (Rarotonga and Mangaia)
- Geniostoma rupestre J.R.Forst. & G.Forst. – Taiwan and Malesia to New Guinea, Australia, and the western Pacific
  - Geniostoma rupestre var. australianum (F.Muell.) B.J.Conn
  - Geniostoma rupestre var. crassifolium (Benth.) B.J.Conn
  - Geniostoma rupestre var. glaberrimum (Benth.) B.J.Conn (syns. Geniostoma astylum and Geniostoma quadrangulare)
  - Geniostoma rupestre var. hoeferi (Gilg & Gilg-Ben.) B.J.Conn
  - Geniostoma rupestre var. lasiostemon (Blume) ined.
  - Geniostoma rupestre var. ligustrifolium (A.Cunn.) B.J.Conn (syn. Geniostoma ligustrifolium) – hangehange
  - Geniostoma rupestre var. rouffaeranum B.J.Conn
  - Geniostoma rupestre var. rupestre (syns. Geniostoma clavigerum, Geniostoma confertiflorum, and Geniostoma uninervium)
  - Geniostoma rupestre var. solomonense B.J.Conn
  - Geniostoma rupestre var. thymeleaceum (Baill.) B.J.Conn
- Geniostoma stipulare A.C.Sm. & B.C.Stone
- Geniostoma sykesii Fosberg & Sachet – Cook Islands
- Geniostoma tinifolium (A.Gray) B.J.Conn
- Geniostoma trichostylum B.J.Conn
- Geniostoma triflorum (Hillebr.) Byng & Christenh.
- Geniostoma umbellatum B.J.Conn
- Geniostoma venosum (Sherff) Byng & Christenh.
- Geniostoma vestitum Baill.
- Geniostoma waialealae (Wawra) Byng & Christenh.
- Geniostoma waiolani (Wawra) Byng & Christenh.
- Geniostoma weinlandii K.Schum.
