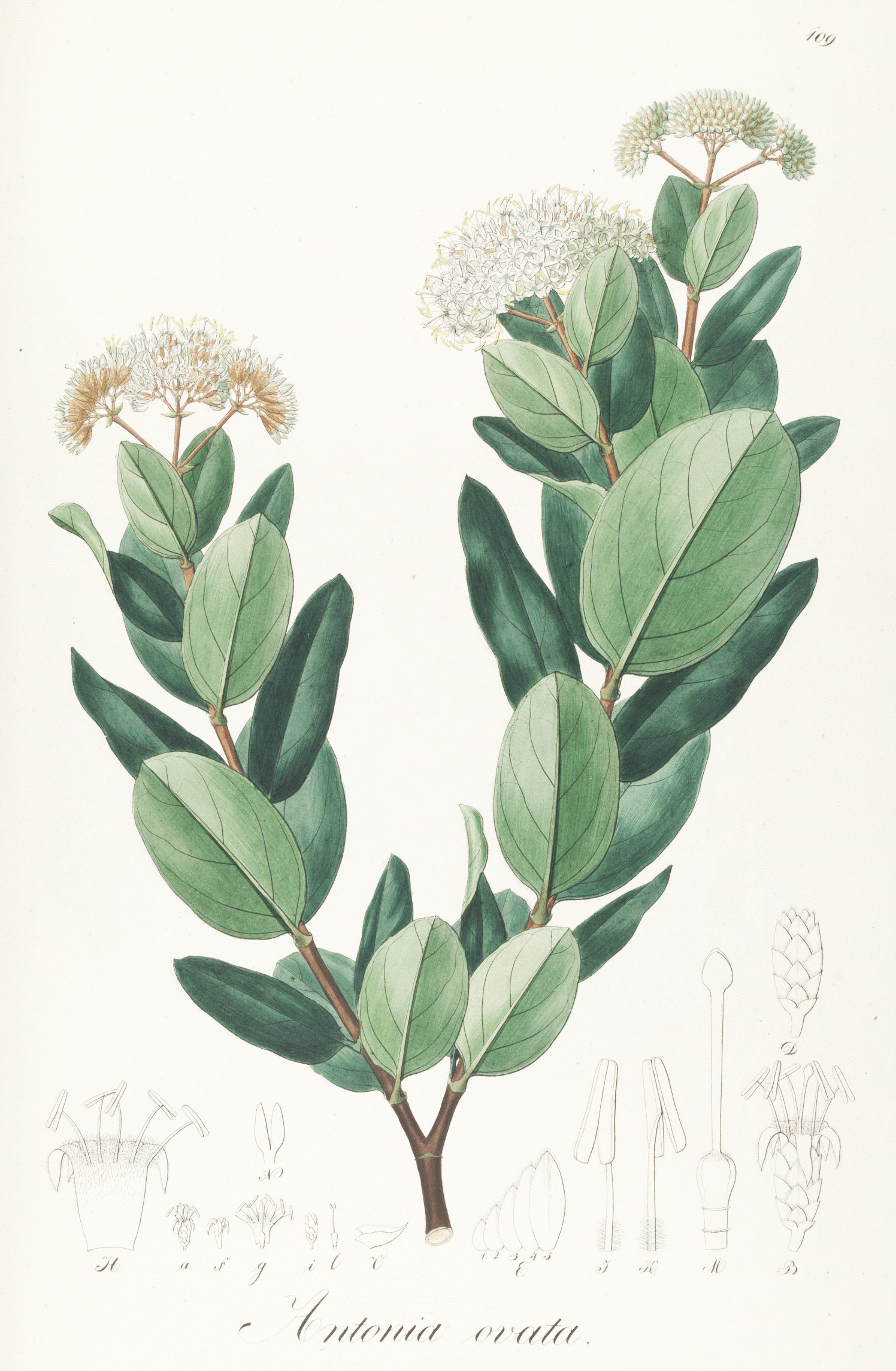
- Antonia ovata

Scientific classification
- Kingdom: Plantae
- Clade: Embryophytes
- Clade: Tracheophytes
- Clade: Spermatophytes
- Clade: Angiosperms
- Clade: Eudicots
- Clade: Asterids
- Order: Gentianales
- Family: Loganiaceae
- Genus: Antonia; Pohl, 1829

Species
- Antonia griffithii Antonia obliqua Antonia ovata Pohl; Antonia pilosa Antonia pubescens

= Antonia (plant) =

Genus of plants

Antonia is a plant genus in the family Loganiaceae.
