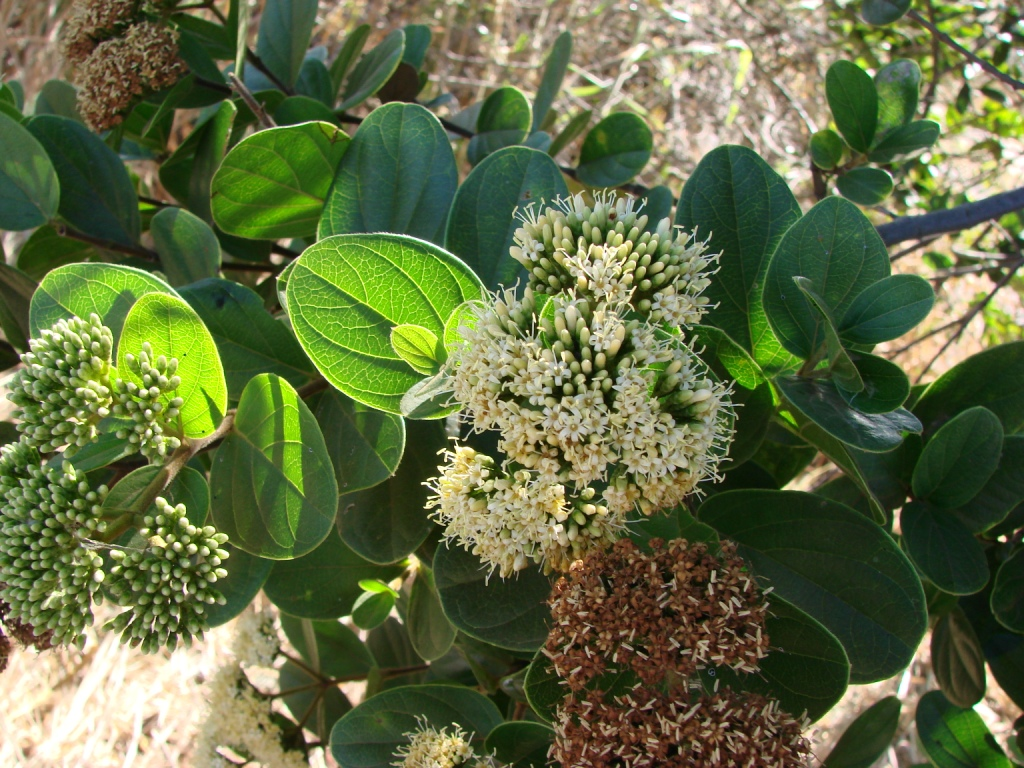
- Antonia ovata

Scientific classification
- Kingdom: Plantae
- Clade: Tracheophytes
- Clade: Angiosperms
- Clade: Eudicots
- Clade: Asterids
- Order: Gentianales
- Family: Loganiaceae
- Genus: Antonia
- Species: A. ovata

Binomial name
- Antonia ovata Pohl

Varieties
- Antonia ovata var. excelsa Antonia ovata var. glabra Antonia ovata var. pilosa

= Antonia ovata =

Species of plant

Antonia ovata is a plant species in the genus Antonia.

== See also ==
- List of plants of Cerrado vegetation of Brazil
