= Bonyunia =

Scientific classification
- Kingdom: Plantae
- Clade: Tracheophytes
- Clade: Angiosperms
- Clade: Eudicots
- Clade: Asterids
- Order: Gentianales
- Family: Loganiaceae
- Genus: Bonyunia; R.H.Schomb. ex Progel

Genus of flowering plants

Bonyunia is a genus of flowering plants belonging to the family Loganiaceae.

Its native range is Southern Tropical America.

Species:

- Bonyunia antoniifolia Progel
- Bonyunia aquatica Ducke
- Bonyunia excelsa J.R.Grant
- Bonyunia magnifica J.R.Grant
- Bonyunia minor N.E.Br.
- Bonyunia nobilis J.R.Grant
- Bonyunia pulchra Ricketson, J.R.Grant & Liesner
- Bonyunia spectabilis J.R.Grant
- Bonyunia superba R.H.Schomb. ex Progel
- Bonyunia venusta J.R.Grant
