= Geniostoma macrophyllum =

Conservation status
- Least Concern (IUCN 3.1)

Scientific classification
- Kingdom: Plantae
- Clade: Tracheophytes
- Clade: Angiosperms
- Clade: Eudicots
- Clade: Asterids
- Order: Gentianales
- Family: Loganiaceae
- Genus: Geniostoma
- Species: G. macrophyllum

Binomial name
- Geniostoma macrophyllum Gillespie

Species of plant

Geniostoma macrophyllum is a species of plant in the Loganiaceae family. It is endemic to Fiji.
