= Adelphacme =

Scientific classification
- Kingdom: Plantae
- Clade: Tracheophytes
- Clade: Angiosperms
- Clade: Eudicots
- Clade: Asterids
- Order: Gentianales
- Family: Loganiaceae
- Genus: Adelphacme; K.L.Gibbons, B.J.Conn & Henwood

Genus of flowering plants

Adelphacme is a genus of flowering plants belonging to the family Loganiaceae.

Its native range is Southwestern Australia.

Species:

- Adelphacme minima (B.J.Conn) K.L.Gibbons, B.J.Conn & Henwood
