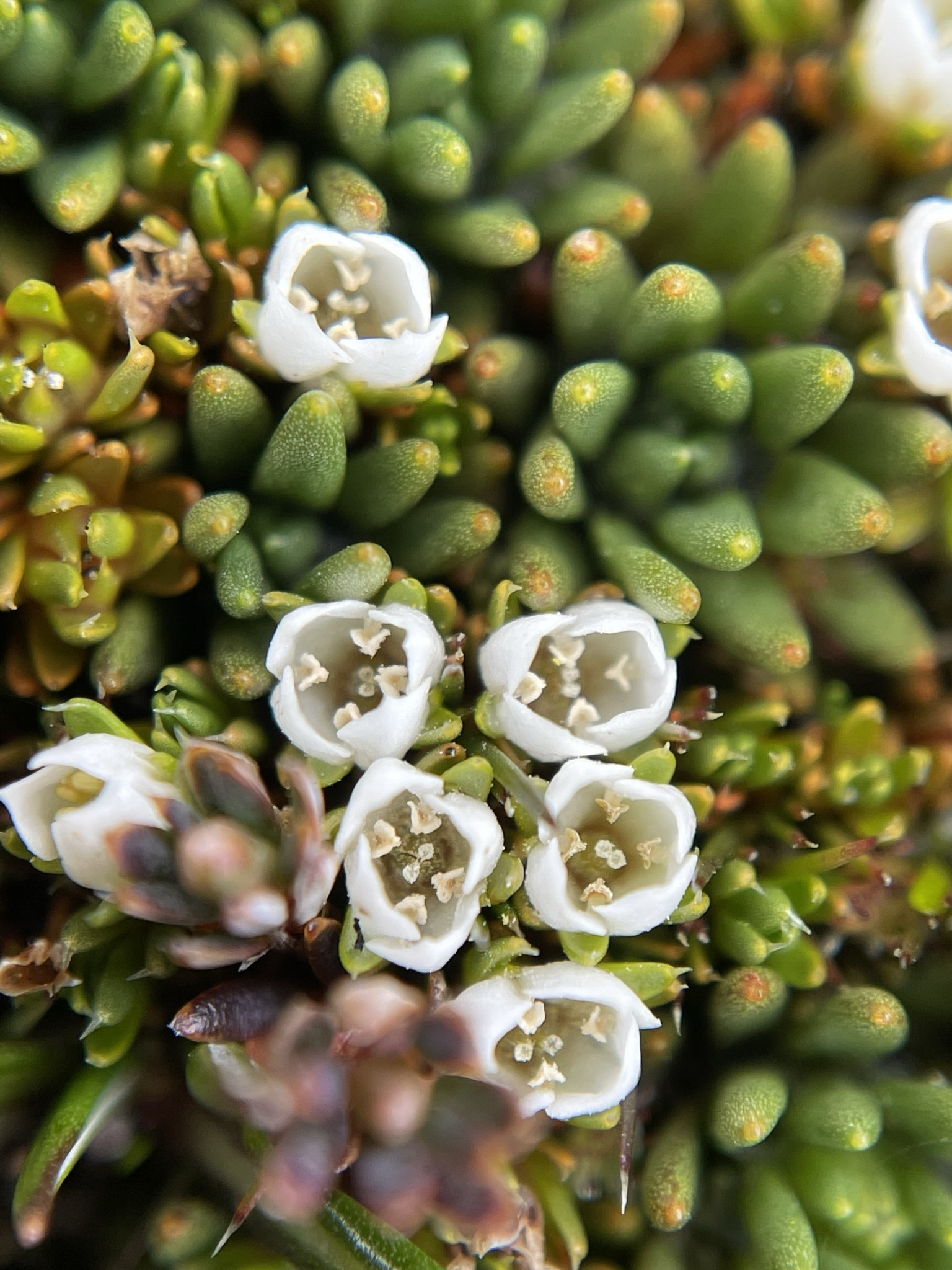
- Schizacme novae-zelandiae

Scientific classification
- Kingdom: Plantae
- Clade: Tracheophytes
- Clade: Angiosperms
- Clade: Eudicots
- Clade: Asterids
- Order: Gentianales
- Family: Loganiaceae
- Genus: Schizacme; Dunlop (1996)

Species
- Schizacme archeri (Hook.f.) Dunlop; Schizacme ciliata K.L.Gibbons; Schizacme helmsii (Kirk) K.L.Gibbons; Schizacme montana (Hook.f. ex Benth.) Dunlop; Schizacme novae-zelandiae (Hook.f.) K.L.Gibbons

= Schizacme =

Genus of plants

Schizacme is a genus of flowering plants in the family Loganiaceae. It includes five species native to southeastern Australia (Victoria), Tasmania, and the South Island of New Zealand.

- Schizacme archeri (Hook.f.) Dunlop
- Schizacme ciliata K.L.Gibbons
- Schizacme helmsii (Kirk) K.L.Gibbons
- Schizacme montana (Hook.f. ex Benth.) Dunlop
- Schizacme novae-zelandiae (Hook.f.) K.L.Gibbons
