= Phyllangium =

Scientific classification
- Kingdom: Plantae
- Clade: Tracheophytes
- Clade: Angiosperms
- Clade: Eudicots
- Clade: Asterids
- Order: Gentianales
- Family: Loganiaceae
- Genus: Phyllangium; Dunlop (1996)

Species
- Phyllangium distylis (F.Muell.) Dunlop; Phyllangium divergens (Hook.f.) Dunlop; Phyllangium palustre (W.Fitzg.) Dunlop; Phyllangium paradoxum (R.Br.) Dunlop; Phyllangium sulcatum Dunlop

Genus of plants

Phyllangium is a genus of flowering plants in the family Loganiaceae. It includes five species native to southern Australia, ranging across parts of New South Wales, South Australia, Tasmania, Victoria, and Western Australia.

- Phyllangium distylis (F.Muell.) Dunlop
- Phyllangium divergens (Hook.f.) Dunlop
- Phyllangium palustre (W.Fitzg.) Dunlop
- Phyllangium paradoxum (R.Br.) Dunlop
- Phyllangium sulcatum Dunlop
