= Orianthera =

Scientific classification
- Kingdom: Plantae
- Clade: Tracheophytes
- Clade: Angiosperms
- Clade: Eudicots
- Clade: Asterids
- Order: Gentianales
- Family: Loganiaceae
- Genus: Orianthera; C.S.P.Foster & B.J.Conn (2014)

Species
- 13; see text

Genus of plants

Orianthera is a genus of flowering plants in the family Loganiaceae. It includes 13 species endemic to Australia.

- Orianthera biloba (B.J.Conn) C.S.P.Foster & B.J.Conn
- Orianthera callosa (F.Muell.) C.S.P.Foster & B.J.Conn
- Orianthera campanulata (R.Br.) C.S.P.Foster & B.J.Conn
- Orianthera centralis (B.J.Conn) C.S.P.Foster & B.J.Conn
- Orianthera exilis (B.J.Conn) C.S.P.Foster & B.J.Conn
- Orianthera flaviflora (F.Muell.) C.S.P.Foster & B.J.Conn
- Orianthera judithiana (B.J.Conn) C.S.P.Foster & B.J.Conn
- Orianthera nuda (F.Muell.) C.S.P.Foster & B.J.Conn
- Orianthera pusilla (R.Br.) C.S.P.Foster & B.J.Conn
- Orianthera serpyllifolia (R.Br.) C.S.P.Foster & B.J.Conn
- Orianthera spermacocea (F.Muell.) C.S.P.Foster & B.J.Conn
- Orianthera tortuosa (D.A.Herb.) C.S.P.Foster & B.J.Conn
- Orianthera wendyae (Cranfield & Keighery) C.S.P.Foster & B.J.Conn
