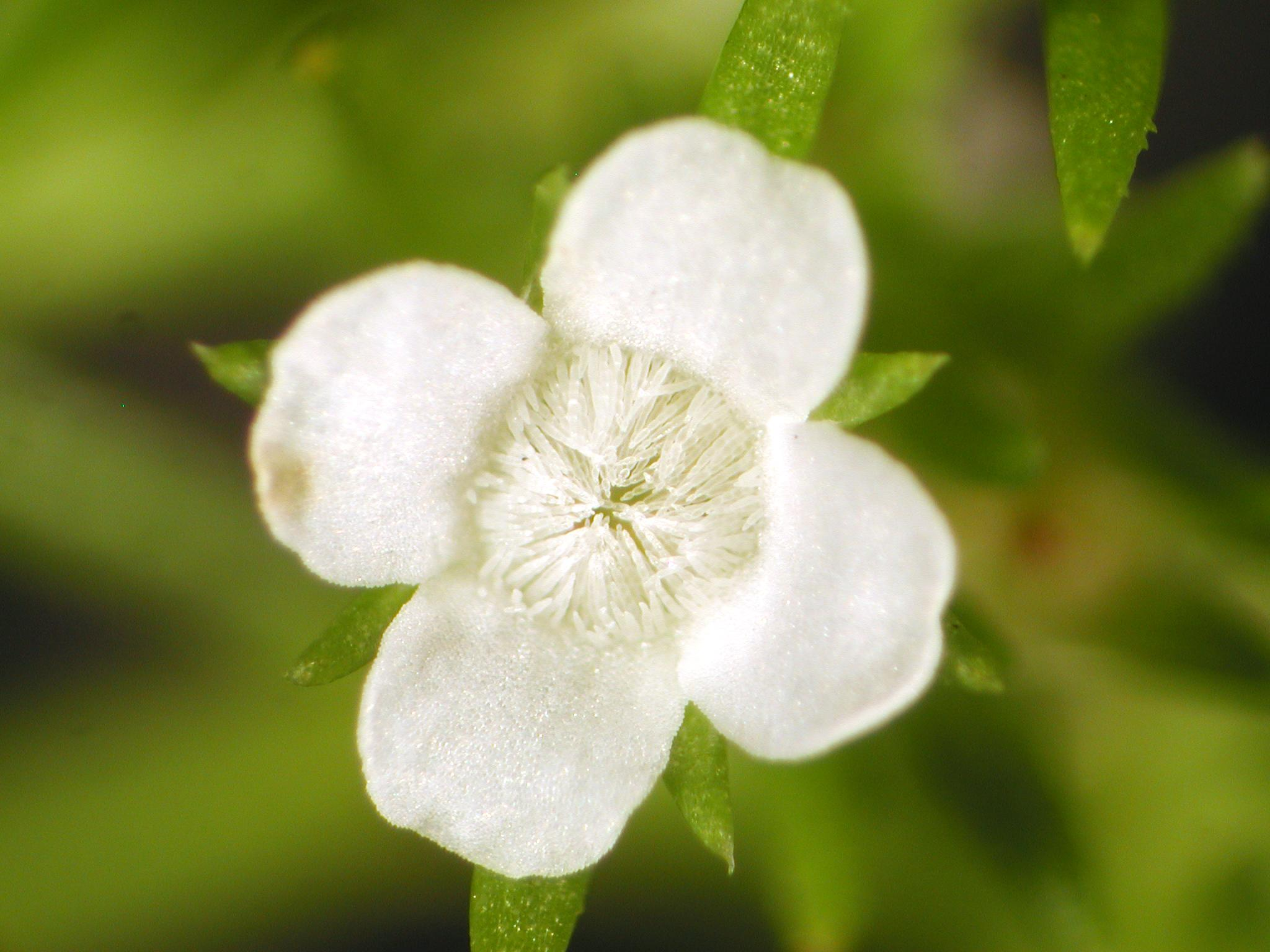
- Polypremum procumbens

Scientific classification
- Kingdom: Plantae
- Clade: Tracheophytes
- Clade: Angiosperms
- Clade: Eudicots
- Clade: Asterids
- Order: Lamiales
- Family: Tetrachondraceae; Wettst.

Genera
- Polypremum L.; Tetrachondra Petrie ex Oliv.

= Tetrachondraceae =

Family of flowering plants

Tetrachondraceae is a plant family in the order Lamiales. The family contains the two genera Polypremum and Tetrachondra, which together comprise the three species:

- Polypremum procumbens L. (1753) – juniper leaf or rustweed
- Tetrachondra hamiltonii Petrie ex Oliv. (1892)
- Tetrachondra patagonica Skottsb. (1912)
