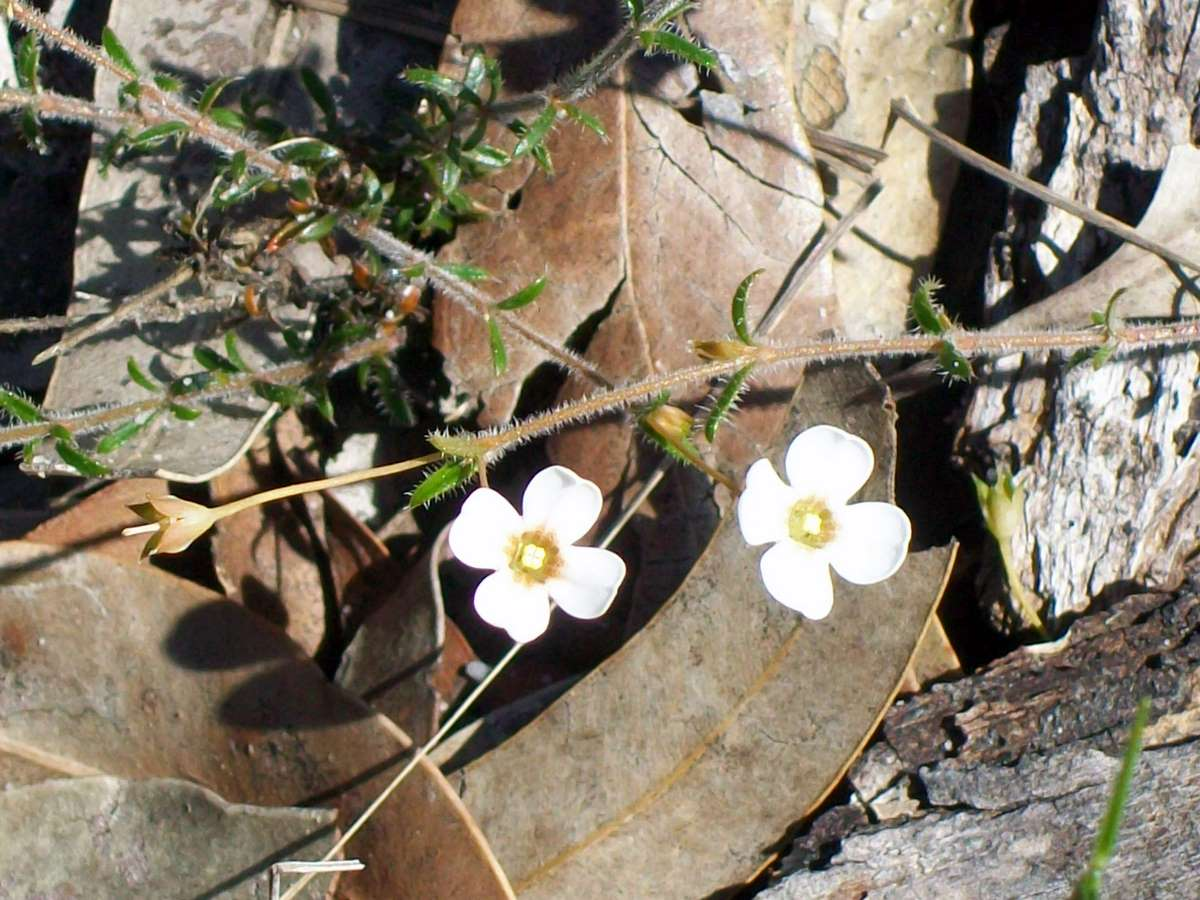
- Mitrasacme polymorpha

Scientific classification
- Kingdom: Plantae
- Clade: Tracheophytes
- Clade: Angiosperms
- Clade: Eudicots
- Clade: Asterids
- Order: Gentianales
- Family: Loganiaceae
- Genus: Mitrasacme; Labill.

Synonyms
- Mitragyne R.Br.

= Mitrasacme =

Genus of plants

Mitrasacme is a genus of plants in the family Loganiaceae. The genus includes 55 species mostly in Australia, though also extending to various parts of Asia and the Pacific Islands. Two species also occur in China.

The name comes from the Greek, alluding to “the highest point of the mitre”. As the fruit capsule has an alleged resemblance to a mitre.

== Species ==
The following 55 species are accepted by Plants of the World Online as of October 2026:

- Mitrasacme aggregata Dunlop
- Mitrasacme albomarginata Leenh.
- Mitrasacme alsinoides R.Br.
- Mitrasacme ambigua R.Br.
- Mitrasacme bogoriensis Leenh.
- Mitrasacme brachystemonea Domin
- Mitrasacme clarksonii Dunlop
- Mitrasacme connata R.Br.
- Mitrasacme elata R.Br.
- Mitrasacme epigaea Dunlop
- Mitrasacme erophila Leenh.
- Mitrasacme exserta F.Muell.
- Mitrasacmefloribunda Dunlop
- Mitrasacme foliosa C.A.Gardner
- Mitrasacme galbina Dunlop
- Mitrasacme geniculosa Dunlop
- Mitrasacme gentianea F.Muell.
- Mitrasacme glaucescens Dunlop
- Mitrasacme graminea Dunlop
- Mitrasacme hispida W.Fitzg.
- Mitrasacme katjarranka N.Gibson & S.J.van Leeuwen
- Mitrasacme kenneallyi Dunlop
- Mitrasacme laevis Benth.
- Mitrasacme laricifolia R.Br.
- Mitrasacme latiflora S.Moore
- Mitrasacme laxiceps Dunlop
- Mitrasacme lutea F.Muell.
- Mitrasacme maritima Dunlop
- Mitrasacme micrantha Domin
- Mitrasacme multicaulis R.Br.
- Mitrasacme neglecta Leenh.
- Mitrasacme neldneri Dunlop
- Mitrasacme nidulifera Dunlop
- Mitrasacme nudicaulis Reinw. ex Blume
- Mitrasacme nummularia S.Moore
- Mitrasacme oasena Dunlop
- Mitrasacme paludosa R.Br.
- Mitrasacme patens Dunlop
- Mitrasacme phascoides R.Br.
- Mitrasacme pilosa Labill.
- Mitrasacme polymorpha R.Br.
- Mitrasacme prolifera R.Br.
- Mitrasacme pygmaea R.Br.
- Mitrasacme retroloba Dunlop
- Mitrasacme saxatilis Backer ex Cammerl.
- Mitrasacme scopata Dunlop
- Mitrasacme scrithicola Dunlop
- Mitrasacme secedens Dunlop
- Mitrasacme serpyllifolia R.Br.
- Mitrasacme setosa Hance
- Mitrasacme squamigera Dunlop
- Mitrasacme stellata R.Br.
- Mitrasacme subvolubilis F.Muell.
- Mitrasacme thedae M.D.Barrett & R.L.Barrett
- Mitrasacme troglodytica Dunlop
