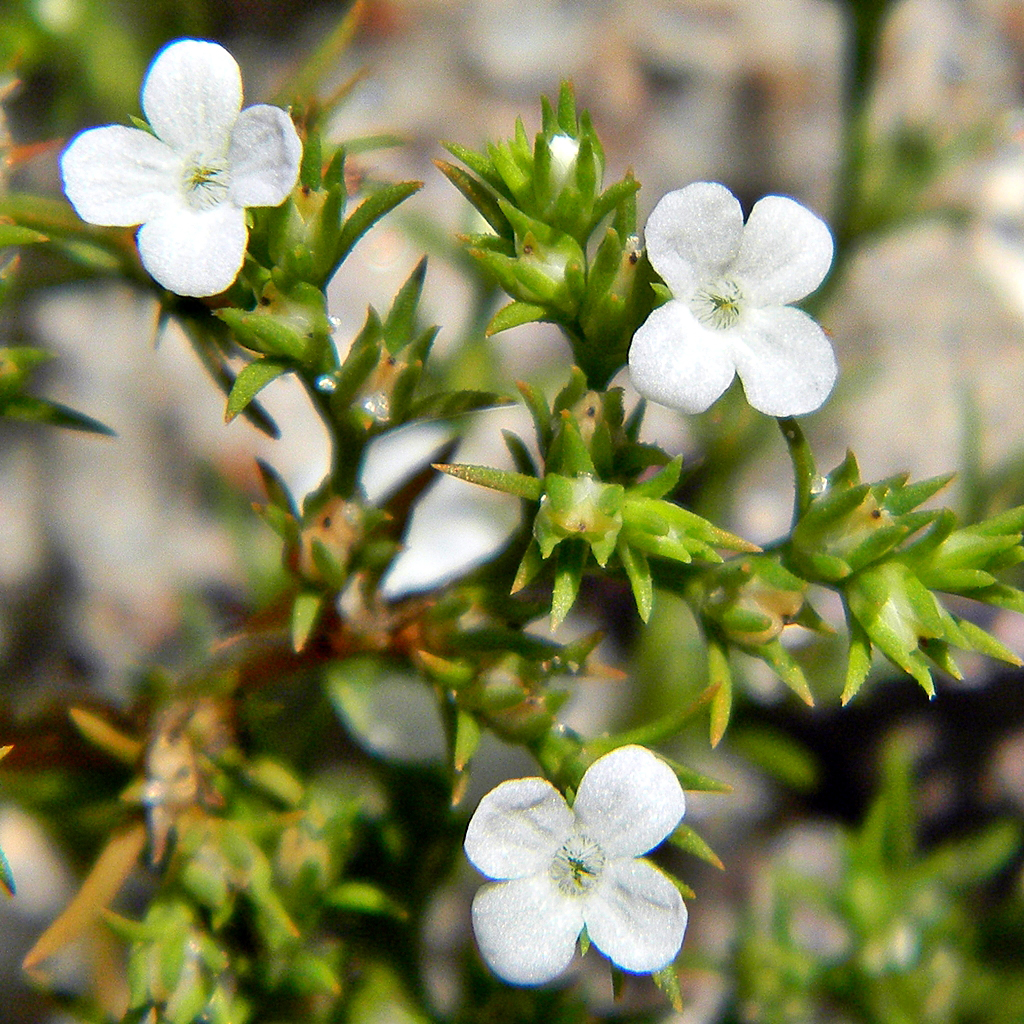

Conservation status
- Secure (NatureServe)

Scientific classification
- Kingdom: Plantae
- Clade: Tracheophytes
- Clade: Angiosperms
- Clade: Eudicots
- Clade: Asterids
- Order: Lamiales
- Family: Tetrachondraceae
- Genus: Polypremum; L.
- Species: P. procumbens

Binomial name
- Polypremum procumbens L.

= Polypremum =

Genus of flowering plants

Polypremum is a flowering plant genus in the family Tetrachondraceae. The genus contains the single species Polypremum procumbens, commonly known as juniperleaf or rustweed. Polypremum has also been placed in the various families Buddlejaceae, Loganiaceae, Rubiaceae, and most recently in its own Polypremaceae.

Polypremum procumbens is a perennial or annual forb/herb, and grows low with sometimes multiple ascending stems producing small white flowers that bloom in summer and fall. Leaves are opposite, 1–2.5 cm, narrow, and pointed at the end. The foliage turns a brownish red in autumn.

Polypremum procumbens is native to the eastern USA excluding New England, south to Central America and the West Indies, with occurrences in South America. It has been introduced in the Pacific basin and Australia, often occurring along roads and airstrips. In its southeastern USA range it is common in coastal plain and piedmont regions, growing in disturbed areas, and rare in the mountains.
