= Norrisia (plant) =

Scientific classification
- Kingdom: Plantae
- Clade: Tracheophytes
- Clade: Angiosperms
- Clade: Eudicots
- Clade: Asterids
- Order: Gentianales
- Family: Loganiaceae
- Genus: Norrisia; Gardner (1849)

Species
- Norrisia major Soler.; Norrisia malaccensis Gardner

Genus of plants

Norrisia is a genus of flowering plants in the family Loganiaceae. It includes two species native to western and central Malesia, ranging from Peninsular Malaysia and Sumatra to Borneo and the Philippines.

- Norrisia major Soler. – Sumatra, Peninsular Malaysia, Borneo, and the Philippines
- Norrisia malaccensis Gardner – southern Peninsular Malaysia, western Sumatra, and the Philippines
