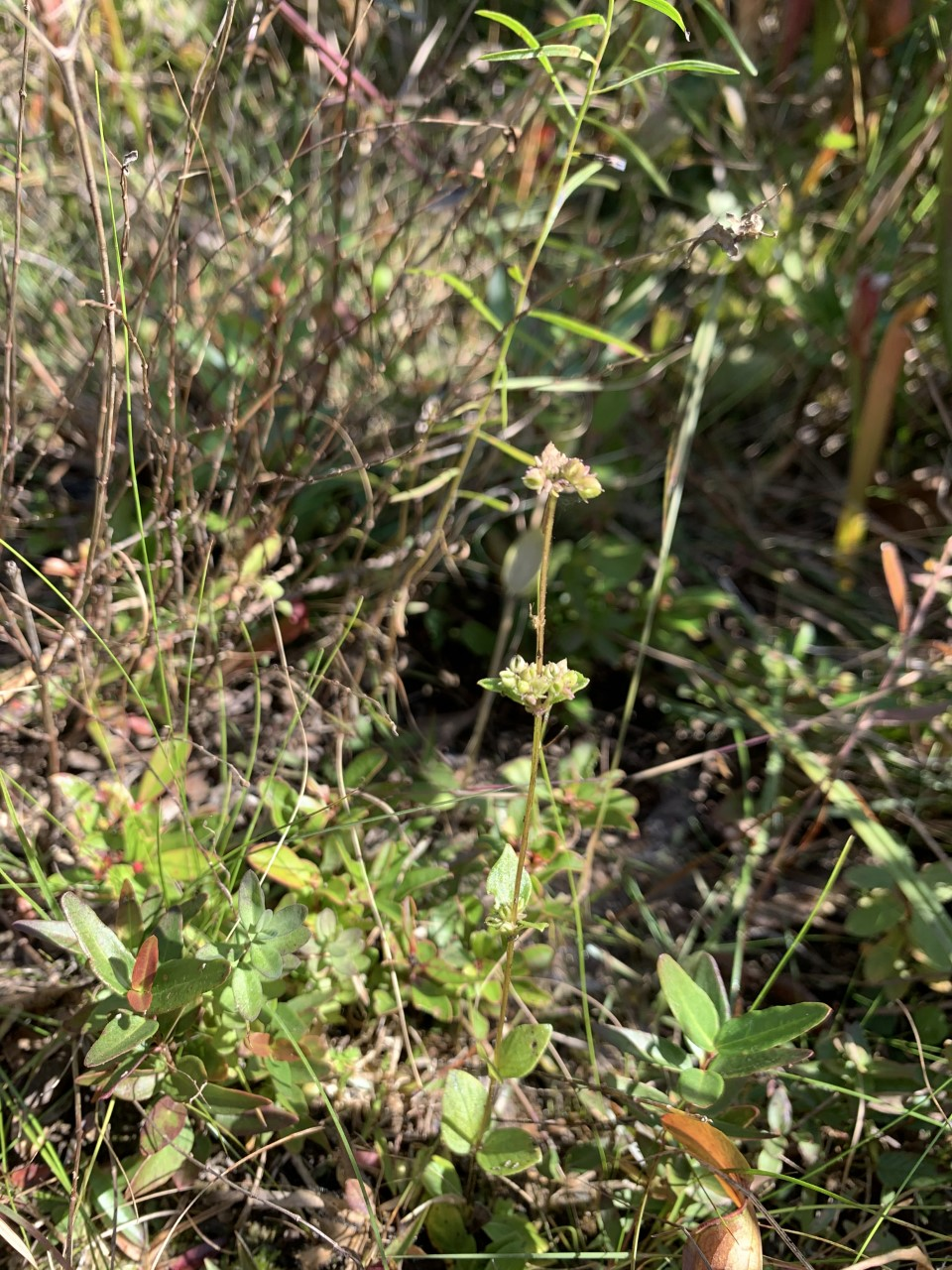

Scientific classification
- Kingdom: Plantae
- Clade: Tracheophytes
- Clade: Angiosperms
- Clade: Eudicots
- Clade: Asterids
- Order: Gentianales
- Family: Loganiaceae
- Genus: Mitreola; L.

= Mitreola (plant) =

Genus of flowering plants

Mitreola, commonly known as hornpod, is a genus of small flowering plants consisting of approximately 13 species in the family Loganiaceae. They are herbaceous perennial plants found in tropical, subtropical, and temperate regions of Africa, Asia, Oceana and the southeastern United States. Some species were previously included in the genus Cynoctonum. Most species are less than a 12" tall, have sessile leaves, and small white flowers.
