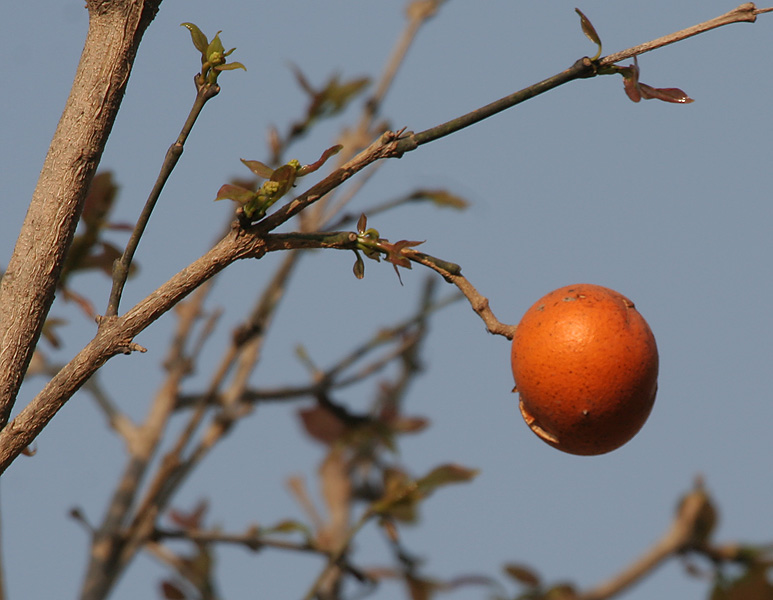
- Strychnos nux-vomica

Scientific classification
- Kingdom: Plantae
- Clade: Tracheophytes
- Clade: Angiosperms
- Clade: Eudicots
- Clade: Asterids
- Order: Gentianales
- Family: Loganiaceae; R.Br. ex Mart.

Genera
- See text

Synonyms
- Antoniaceae Hutch.; Geniostomataceae Struwe & V.A.Albert; Spigeliaceae Bercht. & J.Presl; Strychnaceae DC. ex Perleb

= Loganiaceae =

Loganiaceae Temporal range: Early Miocene to Recent, 22–0 Ma

Family of plants

The Loganiaceae are a family of flowering plants classified in order Gentianales. The family includes up to 13 genera, distributed around the world's tropics. There are not any great morphological characteristics to distinguish these taxa from others in the order Gentianales.

Many members of the Loganiaceae are extremely poisonous, causing death by convulsion. Poisonous properties are largely due to alkaloids such as those found in Strychnos. Glycosides are also present as loganin in Strychnos.

Earlier treatments of the family have included up to 29 genera. Phylogenetic studies have demonstrated that this broadly defined Loganiaceae was a polyphyletic assemblage, and numerous genera have been removed from Loganiaceae to other families (sometimes in other orders), e.g., Gentianaceae, Gelsemiaceae, Plocospermataceae, Tetrachondraceae, Buddlejaceae, and Gesneriaceae. Some classification schemes, notably Takhtajan's, break the remaining Loganiaceae even further, into as many as four families; Strychnaceae, Antoniaceae, Spigeliaceae and Loganiaceae.

== Genera ==
Some sources indicate the family consists of 13 genera. A more recent study considers some Labordia species synonymous with Geniostoma, resulting in 12 genera in other sources. As of November 2023 Plants of the World Online accepts 16 genera:

- Adelphacme K.L.Gibbons, B.J.Conn & Henwood
- Antonia Pohl
- Bonyunia R. H. Schomb. ex Progel
- Gardneria Wall.
- Geniostoma J. R. Forst. & G.Forst. (syn. Labordia Gaudich. )
- Logania R.Br.
- Mitrasacme Labill.
- Mitreola L.
- Neuburgia Blume
- Norrisia Gardner
- Orianthera C.S.P.Foster & B.J.Conn
- Phyllangium Dunlop
- Schizacme Dunlop
- Spigelia L.
- Strychnos L.
- Usteria Willd.

=== Excluded genera ===
- Androya H.Perrier -> Scrophulariaceae
- Anthocleista Afzel. ex R.Br. -> Gentianaceae
- Buddleja L. -> Scrophulariaceae
- Desfontainia Ruiz & Pav. -> Columelliaceae
- Emorya Torr. -> Scrophulariaceae
- Fagraea Thunb. -> Gentianaceae
- Gelsemium Juss. -> Gelsemiaceae
- Gomphostigma Turcz. -> Scrophulariaceae
- Mostuea Didr. -> Gelsemiaceae
- Nuxia Comm. ex Lam. -> Stilbaceae
- Peltanthera Benth. -> Gesneriaceae
- Plocosperma Benth. -> Plocospermataceae
- Polypremum L. -> Tetrachondraceae
- Potalia Aubl. -> Gentianaceae
- Retzia Thunb. -> Stilbaceae
